= Ankara–Kars railway =

Railway in Turkey

Ankara-Kars railway
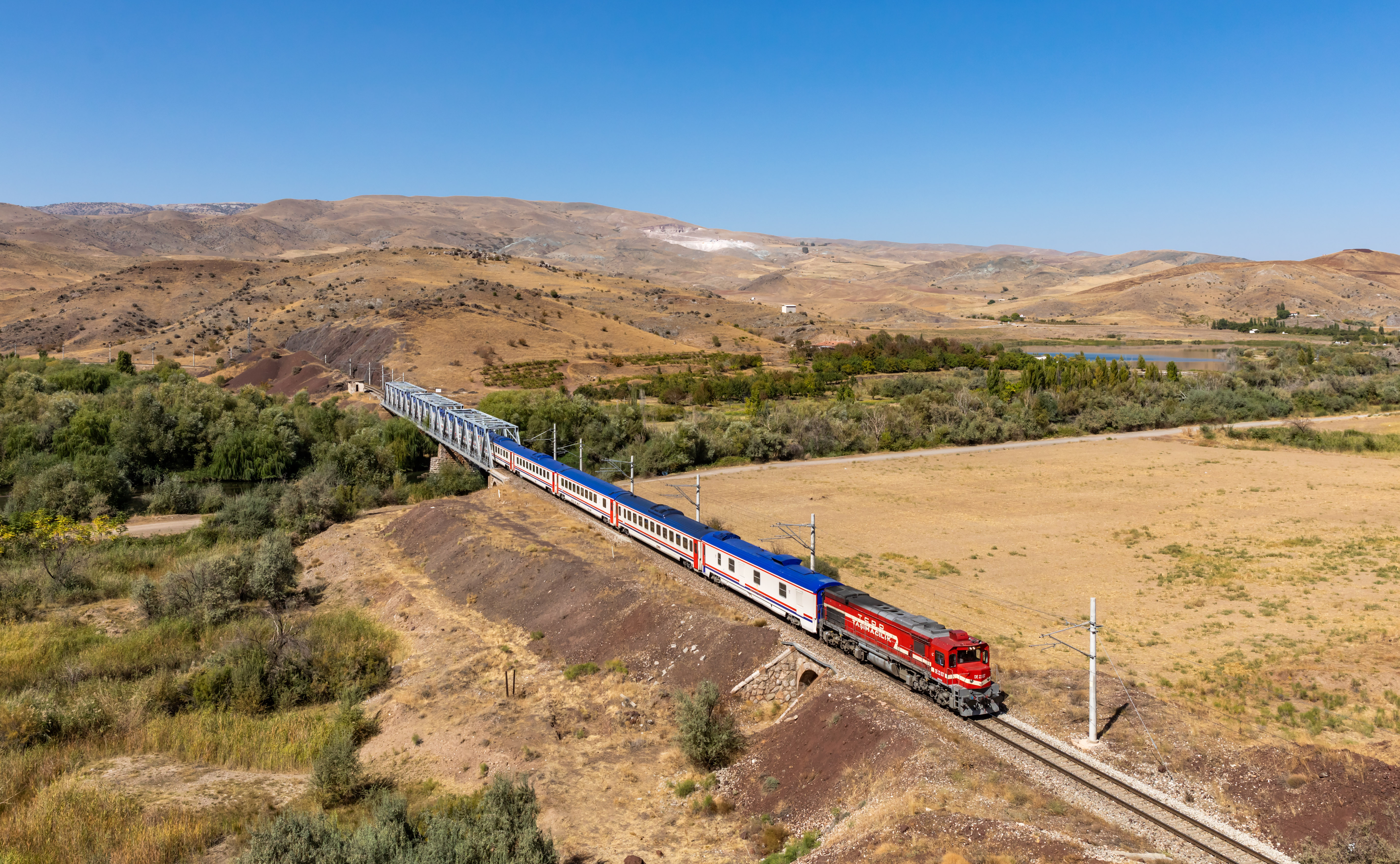
- The Southern Kurtalan Express heading east near Irmak.

Overview
- Native name: Ankara-Kars demiryolu
- Status: Operating
- Owner: Turkish State Railways
- Locale: Central Anatolia; Eastern Anatolia
- Termini: Ankara, Turkey; Kars, Turkey

Service
- Type: Heavy rail
- System: Turkish State Railways
- Operator(s): TCDD Taşımacılık; Körfez Ulaştırma

History
- Opened: 1913 (First section); 20 October 1939 (Last section)
- Converted to standard gauge: 1957 (Erzurum-Sarıkamış); 1961 (Sarıkamış-Kars)

Technical
- Line length: 1,446.1 km (898.6 mi)
- Number of tracks: Single track (mostly)
- Track gauge: 1,435 mm (4 ft 8 1/2 in) standard gauge
- Old gauge: 1,520 mm (4 ft 11 27/32 in); 750 mm (2 ft 5 1/2 in)
- Electrification: 25 kV, 15 Hz (Ankara-Divriği)
- Operating speed: 120 km (75 mi) (Max.)
- Signalling: ETCS L0

The Ankara–Kars railway (Turkish: Ankara-Kars demiryolu) is a major railway in Turkey. Stretching 1,446.1 km (898.6 mi) across, it is by far the longest railway line in the country. The railway begins in Ankara and travels east via Kırıkkale, Kayseri, Sivas, Erzincan and Erzurum, until Kars, in the far east of Turkey. The majority of the railway is single-track, however multi-track sections are present within Ankara, Kayseri and Sivas. 845 km (525 mi) of the line is electrified with 25 kV AC, 15 Hz overhead wire from Ankara to Divriği.

The route hosts many freight trains, especially between Ankara and Divriği, but also hosts many intercity and regional passenger trains. Among these trains are the popular Eastern Express, Southern Kurtalan Express and the Van Lake Express. The railway also parallels the Ankara-Sivas high-speed railway between Ankara and Yerköy, which opened to revenue service on 26 April 2023.

Built in stages between 1910 and 1939 by two different railway companies, the line originally consisted of three different gauges.

== Infrastructure and route ==
The railway consists of mostly single-track, but does have multiple track sections in Ankara, Kayseri and Sivas. In Ankara, the railway is quadruple-tracked for 17 km (11 mi) from Ankara station to Kayaş. The two north tracks are for local Başkentray commuter trains, while the two south tracks are shared among intercity, high-speed and freight trains. Following Kayaş, the railway remains quadruple-track for just over 9 km (5.6 mi); the two north tracks are for high-speed trains, while the two south tracks are for intercity and freight trains. Just east of the village of Gökçeyurt, the Ankara-Sivas high-speed railway splits from the Ankara–Kars railway and the latter becomes a single-track railway. The next double-tracked section is the 23.3 km (14.5 mi) long Kayseri bypass, which branches off from the railway at Boğazköprü and rejoins the line just east of Kayseri. The final double-tracked section begins west of Sivas, where the Ankara-Sivas high-speed railway rejoins the line near Yapı and runs 9 km (5.6 mi) east to Sivas station.

The Ankara–Kars railway has the longest stretch of dark territory in Turkey, as 587 km (365 mi) of railway east of Divriği to Kars is not signalized.

Due to the original right-of-way of the Ankara–Kars railway, three bypasses were built between the early 1990s and 2012. Two of these bypasses are to allow a more direct route for trains bypassing Sivas and Kayseri, while the third is a more direct route through the Tecer Mountains.

=== Kayseri bypass ===
The Kayseri bypass (Turkish: Kayseri varyantı) is a 23.3 km (14.5 mi) long double-track railway that runs around the northern outskirts of Kayseri. Built between 2009 and 2011, the bypass branches off of the main line east of Boğazköprü (about 12 km (7.5 mi) northwest of Kayseri station) and continues east, while the main line heads southeast into the city. Track geometry was constructed in anticipation for the addition of high-speed rail as the route has a top speed of 160 km/h (99 mph).

=== Sivas bypass ===
The Sivas bypass, or the Hanlı-Bostankaya railway is a 44 km (27 mi) single-track railway line which allows freight trains to bypass Sivas. The railway reduces the distance between Hanlı and Bostankaya by 53 km (33 mi), as well as reducing freight train traffic within Sivas. The connection was planned as early as 1984, but construction did not start until the early 1990s. The railway was opened in 1994.

=== Deliktaş Tunnel ===
The Deliktaş Tunnel (Turkish: Deliktaş Tüneli) is a 5,743 m (18,842 ft) long tunnel on the Tecer-Kangal bypass. Located roughly 45 km (28 mi) south of Sivas, the tunnel was built as a more direct pass between Tecer and Kangal, along with slightly shortening the route, reducing grades and allowing for higher speeds with fewer sharp curves. The length of the entire bypass is 47 km (29 mi) long, only 3 km (1.9 mi) shorter than the older route. Construction of the tunnel began on 15 November 1973 but faced massive delays and setbacks. Work sped up in 2003 and the tunnel was completed in 2006. Following some more delays for the construction of the track infrastructure, the tunnel and bypass were opened in 2012.

== History ==
The Ankara–Kars railway was built in stages, largely by two separate railway companies, first from the east and then from the west.

=== Transcaucasus Railway ===
The oldest section of the railway began in Kars, when it was under the control of the Russian Empire. Won during the Russo-Turkish war in 1877, Kars became a Russian outpost town within Anatolia. In order to strengthen their grip on the region, the Transcaucasus Railway completed a railway from Gyumri to Kars in 1899. In 1910, the railway was further extended west to Sarıkamış, which was 32 km (20 mi) east of the Russian/Turkish border. This was built in the standard Russian 4 ft 11 27/32 in (1,520 mm) broad gauge. The extension to Sarıkamış was completed in 1913.

Following the outbreak of World War I, Russia invaded the Ottoman Empire and further extended the railway into captured territory. In 1916, under the orders of General Nikolai Yudenich, the Russian Army built a 2 ft 5 1/2 in (750 mm) narrow gauge railway from Sarıkamış to Erzurum, a distance of 173 km (107 mi). This was further extended by 50 km (31 mi) from Erzurum to Yeniköy by the end of the year. After the Russian Revolution of 1917, the Russian Army disintegrated, allowing the Ottomans to recapture lost territory as well as advance beyond the border at Sarıkamış. The Yeniköy-Erzurum section of the line was abandoned shortly after. Following the end of the war and the subsequent Turkish-Armenian War, the current border was drawn, about 130 km (81 mi) east of the pre-war Russo-Turkish border. The 1921 Treaty of Kars relinquished Russian control over the railway and the entire line, from Erzurum to the new Turkish/Soviet border at Doğukapı, came under the control of the Turkish military.

In 1925, the Turkish government created the Eastern Railway (Turkish: Havali-yi Şarkiye Demiryolları İdaresi) to take over and operate the railway.

=== Construction from the west ===
A railway from Ankara to Sivas, via Kayseri, was originally planned during the reign of Abdulhamid II. The Anatolian Railway opened the railway to Ankara on 31 December 1892, with the concession to extend it further east as part of the Baghdad Railway. However the Russian Empire threatened war with the Ottomans, should a railway line be built into north-east Anatolia. Weakened from the war with Russia in 1877–78, the Ottomans instead chose to build the railway to Baghdad via Konya and Adana, abandoning plans for constructing a railway beyond Ankara.

During the First World War, a 127 km (79 mi) narrow gauge railway was constructed from Ankara to İzzettinköy and opened in August 1919. After the Turkish War of Independence and the establishment of the Republic of Turkey, a railway east of Ankara became the primary focus of the government. On 23 March 1924, the construction of a railway from Ankara to Sivas was commissioned, making it the first railway line constructed by the republic. To build the line, the Turkish government created the Railway Construction and Management Administration, to oversee the construction of this and other future railways as well as investing ₺65 million (approx. $33.3 million) for the construction of the railway from Ankara to Sivas and Sivas to Samsun.

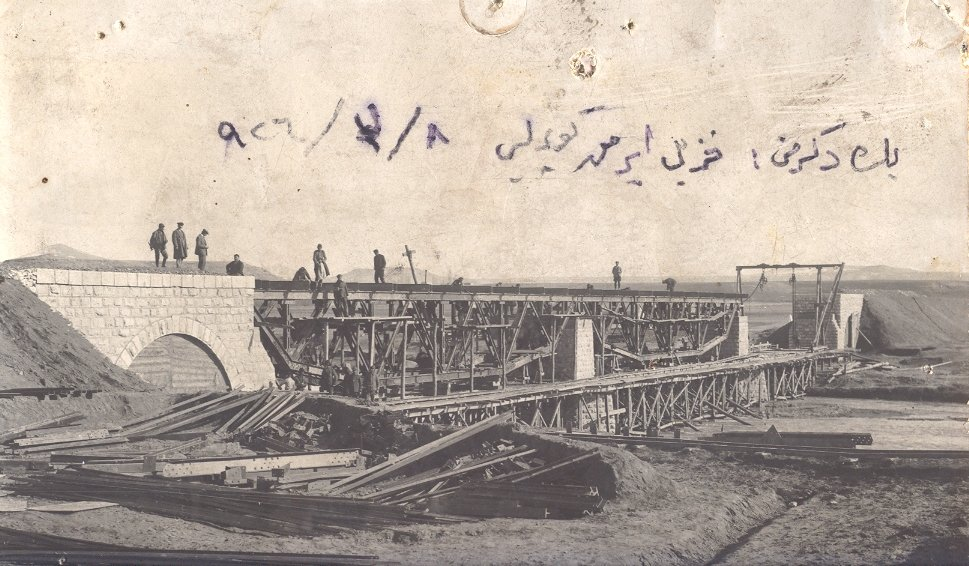
Construction of a bridge crossing the Kızılırmak River.

The narrow gauge railway to İzzettinköy was first converted to standard gauge and construction further east began on 10 October 1924. The railway was opened from Ankara to Yahşihan, on 17 April 1925, and further to Yerköy on 20 November 1925. The original route of the railway was to reach Sivas, via a direct route through Yozgat, however the Turkish military stressed that strategically, the railway would not be much use in connecting to population centers. As a result of these concerns, the route of the railway was altered and constructed south to reach Kayseri. The railway was opened to Kayseri on 29 May 1927, with a large ceremony attended by Prime Minister İsmet İnönü.

A reorganization of Turkish railways also happened in 1927, as parliament sought to consolidate its nationalized railway companies. The Eastern Railway, operating the railway line from Doğukapı to Erzurum; the Anatolian Baghdad Railways, operating the railway from Istanbul to Ankara and Eskişehir to Pozantı; and the Railway Construction and Management Administration, which oversaw the construction of the railway between Ankara and Kayseri, all merged to form the State Railways and Seaports Administration (Turkish: Devlet Demiryolları ve Limanları İdare-i Umumiyesi), which would become the direct predecessor to the Turkish State Railways. This merger brought the entirety of the Ankara–Kars railway under the control of one company.

While construction was underway to Kayseri, the Turkish government signed an agreement with the Belgian construction company Societe Industrielle des Travaux, for $15 million, on 18 December 1926 for the construction of the line between Kayseri and Sivas. The agreement stated that construction of the railway would commence in March 1927 and would be completed in 1930. Alongside this extension, the agreement also included the construction of railway between Sivas and Turhal, on the Samsun-Kalın railway. However problems soon arose with construction as the Belgian company faced financial issues of their own. In response to this, Turkish parliament voted to cancel the contract. Since the Turkish government took upon no risk with the agreement, they only ended up paying the company for the amount of track already built. Shortly after the agreement was canceled, another tender was awarded to a Turkish company, tasked with completing the railway to Sivas. Construction progressed without a problem and on 1 February 1930, the railway opened between Kayseri and Şarkışla, 84 km (52 mi) southwest of Sivas. A few months later the railway was completed to Sivas and officially opened on 30 August 1930, with another large ceremony. The entire cost of construction from Kayseri ended up to be ₺41.2 million.

The construction of railway beyond Sivas, to Erzurum, was also seen as a matter of national security. In a speech given on 30 September 1924 in Erzurum, President Mustafa Kemal said the following: "I consider a railway connection to this point [Erzurum], which will connect the east to other parts of our homeland, a vital necessity for the Turkish Republic.". (Note: Following the 1924 Erzurum earthquake, Mustafa Kemal visited the city and delivered a speech, the original being: "Şarkı diğer vatan aksamına bağlayacak bir şimendifer hattının buraya [Erzurum] kadar temdidini Türk Cumhuriyeti için hayati bir mesele addediyorum(...)") However, the Great Depression had affected Turkey negatively and construction did not commence until 1933. On 20 May 1933, parliament approved the construction of a railway from Sivas to Erzurum, along with a connecting railway from Malatya, which would join the line near Divriği. The railway was to be completed in eight years and given a budget of ₺80 million.

Since the railway carried a strategic importance for Turkey, the potential route of the line was heavily debated between 1930 and 1933. The engineers wanted to construct the railway via Zara, along a more geographically forgiving terrain. However the Chief of Staff, Marshall Fevzi Çakmak, called for the railway to run along a more southern route following the Kangal Stream. While this route was seen as more strategic, the terrain was also more difficult to navigate. In the end, the Ministry of Construction decided to build the route as proposed by Çakmak. Several international and Turkish companies bid for the tender, notable among them was Julius Berger. Following the submission of bids, the tender was awarded to a Turkish company owned by Nuri Bey, on 12 June 1933. Signed on 29 June, this marked the first time a large railway tender was awarded to a Turkish company.

Construction began on 4 September 1933, the 14th anniversary of the Sivas Congress. The railway was opened to Tecer on 19 December 1935 and to Divriği on 20 November 1937. Construction was sped up and on 8 October 1938, the railway reached Erzincan, 156 km (97 mi) further east of Divriği. The railway officially opened from Sivas to Erzincan on 10 December. That same month, construction of the right-of-way reached Erzurum and laying of track began shortly after. Despite the difficult terrain, construction of the railway progressed smoothly, prompting the Turkish government to request that the completion date be brought forward. The Turkish company building the railway accepted the request and the laying of track was greatly expedited. Tracks reached Aşkale on 28 July 1939 and Erzurum on 6 September. The entire railway was finally opened on 20 October 1939. The Turkish company received great praise from the government, as it completed the agreed works 16 months ahead of schedule.

A total of 131 tunnels were built, with a total length of 26,885 m (88,205 ft). For their construction, the Turkish government paid a total of ₺10.754 million. The cost of the railway from Sivas to Erzurum totaled to ₺50,521,846 and together with the 140 km (87 mi) long connecting railway from Malatya, totaled to ₺84,413,463.

=== Converting the line to Standard Gauge ===
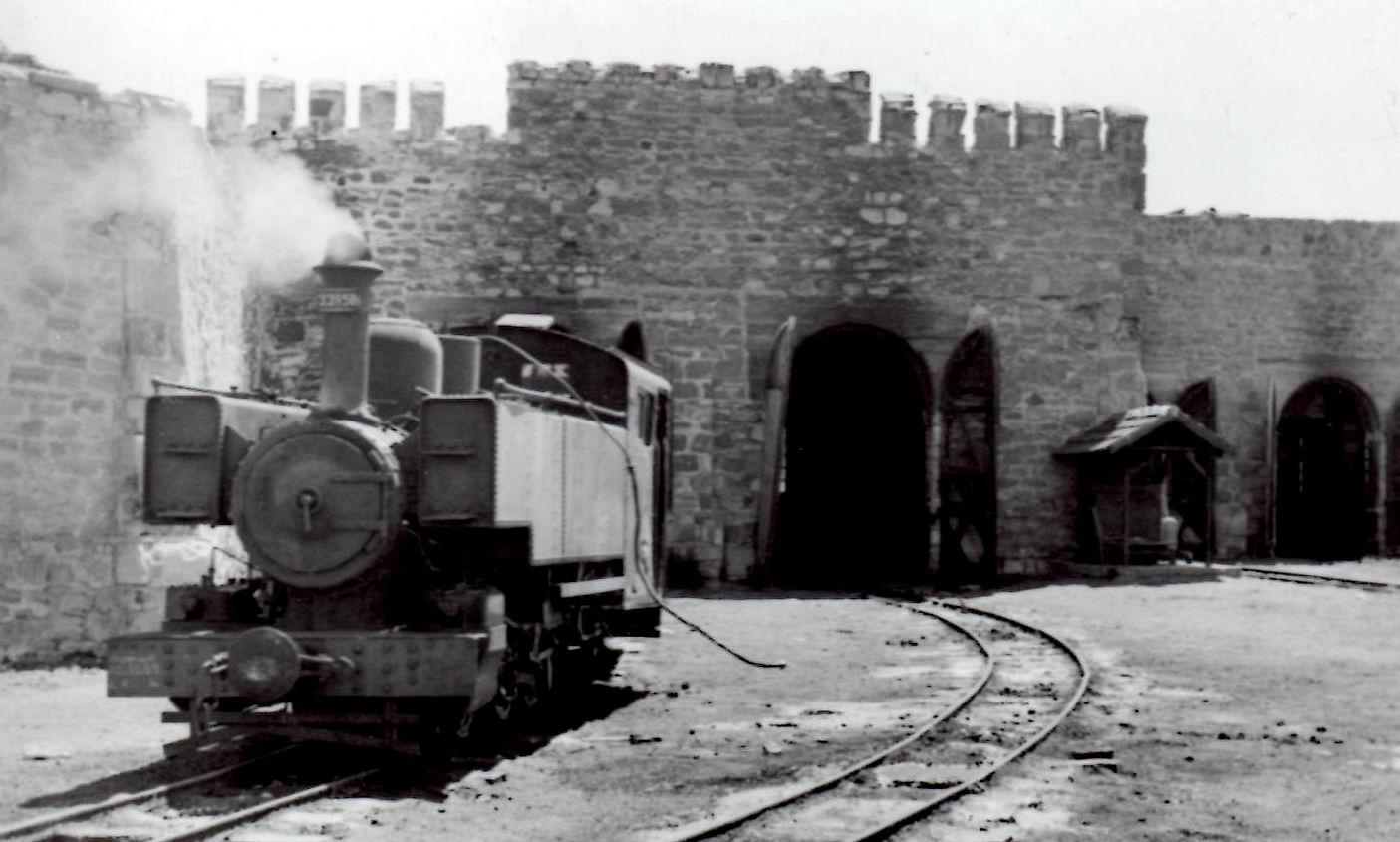
A narrow gauge locomotive, built by Alco and nicknamed "Amerikan", at Horasan in 1956.

1939 marked the completion year of the entire railway, but the entire route included three different railway gauges:

- The majority of the route, from Ankara to Erzurum (1,149 km (714 mi)), was 1,435 mm (4 ft 8 1/2 in) standard gauge.
- Between Erzurum and Sarıkamış (156 km (97 mi)), the line consisted of 750 mm (2 ft 5 1/2 in) narrow gauge.
- From Sarıkamış to Kars (60 km (37 mi)), and further to the Turkish/Soviet border, consisted of 1,520 mm (4 ft 11 27/32 in) Russian gauge.

This became problematic as any goods, or potentially soldiers, would need to transfer trains twice; first at Erzurum, and then at Sarıkamış. Plans to convert the entire line to standard gauge were first discussed in 1938, before the completion of the railway to Erzurum. Conversion would first begin with a 22 km (14 mi) long extension of the standard gauge railway, from Erzurum to the village of Uzunahmetler. Despite the short length, this section would require the construction of a 60 m (200 ft) long viaduct, as well as a 1,800 m (5,900 ft) long tunnel. Once built however, the railway would reach the Pasinler plain, allowing for better transport of construction materials for the rest of the project. On 13 December 1939, the decision to begin construction was made and ₺2.5 million was budgeted. The entire conversion would be divided into two parts: from Erzurum to Horasan and Horasan to Sarıkamış and Kars. Despite the tender being awarded for the first section to Uzunahmetler, construction did not commence due to a disagreement between the Ministry of Construction and the Ministry of Finance. The outbreak of World War II halted all plans as Turkey's budget was focused on maintaining a large standing army, should the war spillover into its borders.

On 2 August 1944, the conversion of the railway was once again discussed and ₺40 million was budgeted but construction was not able to move forward right away. After long delays, conversion was completed to Uzunahmetler in 1949 and 67 km (42 mi) further to Horasan within two years, opening on 1 October 1951. Conversion of the remaining railway from Horasan to Kars began in 1954. The standard gauge railway reached Sarıkamış by 1957, but did not open until the entire line to Kars (and to the Soviet border) was complete. This took place first on 2 June 1961, with the opening of the railway between Horasan and Sarıkamış, and then on 14 September 1961, with the opening of the remaining railway from Sarıkamış to Kars and the Soviet border.

With the conversion of the railway to standard gauge, the Turkish State Railways (TCDD) scrapped its seven broad-gauge steam locomotives used on the line. The narrow gauge locomotives were either scrapped, or transferred to Samsun to operate on the Samsun-Çarşamba railway, which became the last narrow gauge railway in Turkey until its abandonment in 1971.

=== Electrification ===
The first electrified section of the Ankara–Kars railway was the 12 km (7.5 mi) long section from Ankara station to Kayaş, electrified in 1971. This was done as part of the Ankara suburban commuter rail line, running from Sincan to Kayaş, via Ankara station. Alongside electrification, this section was also double-tracked. Originally, commuter trains consisted of E40000 electric locomotives pulling passenger coaches. TCDD soon ordered new EMU sets for its commuter lines in Ankara and Istanbul, the first of which arrived in 1979. These new EMUs, the E14000 series, began to replace the locomotive hauled trains as they could operate bi-directional and did not require turning the trains around at each terminus.

The next electrified section of the railway was a 65 km (40 mi) long stretch from Divriği to Çetinkaya. This was done as part of a 576 km (358 mi) long electrified freight corridor from the iron ore mines at Divriği, to the steel plant and ports near İskenderun. Electric locomotives are able to better operate the grades through Turkey's mountainous terrain than diesel locomotives, making transport of ore more efficient. This electrification process began in 1988 and was completed in 1998. Locomotives used on this section were almost exclusively the E43000 series.

In the 2010s, the State Railways began electrifying most of its main lines, including the Ankara–Kars railway. The electrification would stretch 815 km (506 mi) from Ankara to Çetinkaya, including the three bypasses, allowing for continuous electric operation from western Turkey. Construction started in 2014 around Kayseri and was built in two directions: west towards Ankara and east towards Sivas; simultaneously, electrification works also began in Ankara and progressed east. The first completed section was a 60 km (37 mi) stretch from Boğazköprü to Tuzhisar, via the Kayseri bypass line, completed in 2016. By 2017, electrification extended further west from Boğazkörü to Şefaatli and east from Tuzhisar to Karaözü; and in Ankara extended east from Kayaş to Lalahan. In 2018 the railway through Kayseri was electrified and in 2019, electrification reached Balışıh, from Lalahan. By 2020, this was extended 75 km (47 mi) further east to Hanlı, from Karaözü. In 2021, the 352 km (219 mi) long section from Ankara to Kayseri was officially opened with a ceremony at Kayseri on 9 December and the first revenue electric trains began running on the line. Electrification of the railway west of Sivas was completed in 2023; this 9 km (5.6 mi) section was electrified to allow high-speed trains from the Ankara-Sivas high-speed railway to reach Sivas station. The electrification of the remaining 180 km (110 mi) of railway from Hanlı to Çetinkaya was completed in December 2023.

== Pictures ==
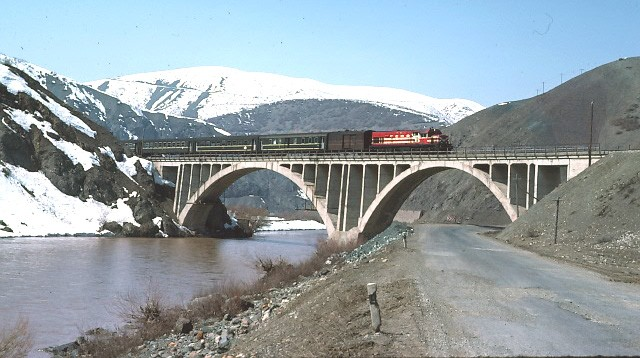
The Eastern Express crossing the Euphrates in 1976.

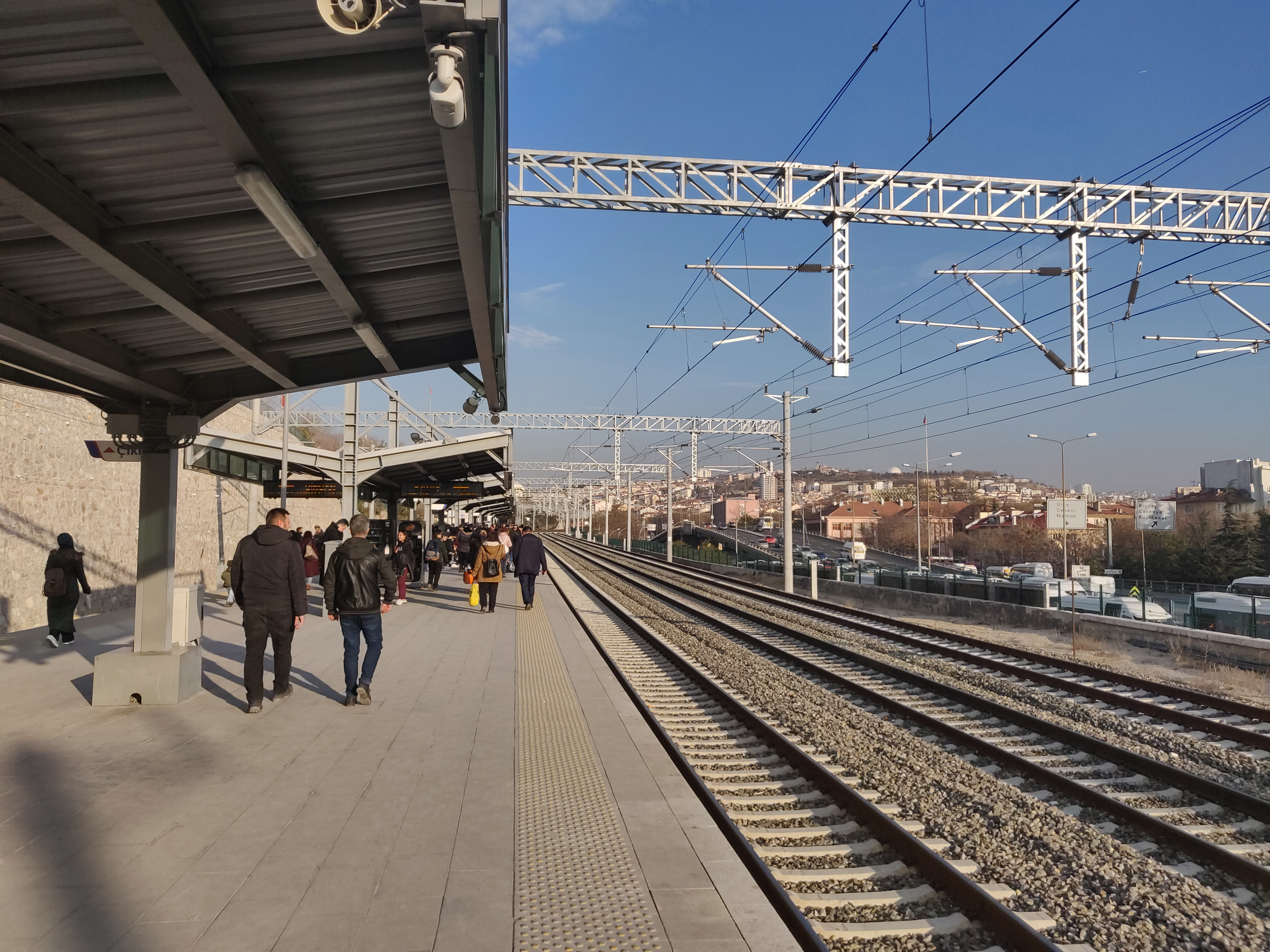
The quadruple-track section of the railway in Ankara.
