= Gazi Mahallesi railway station =

Railway station in Ankara, Turkey

GAZİ MAHALLESİ
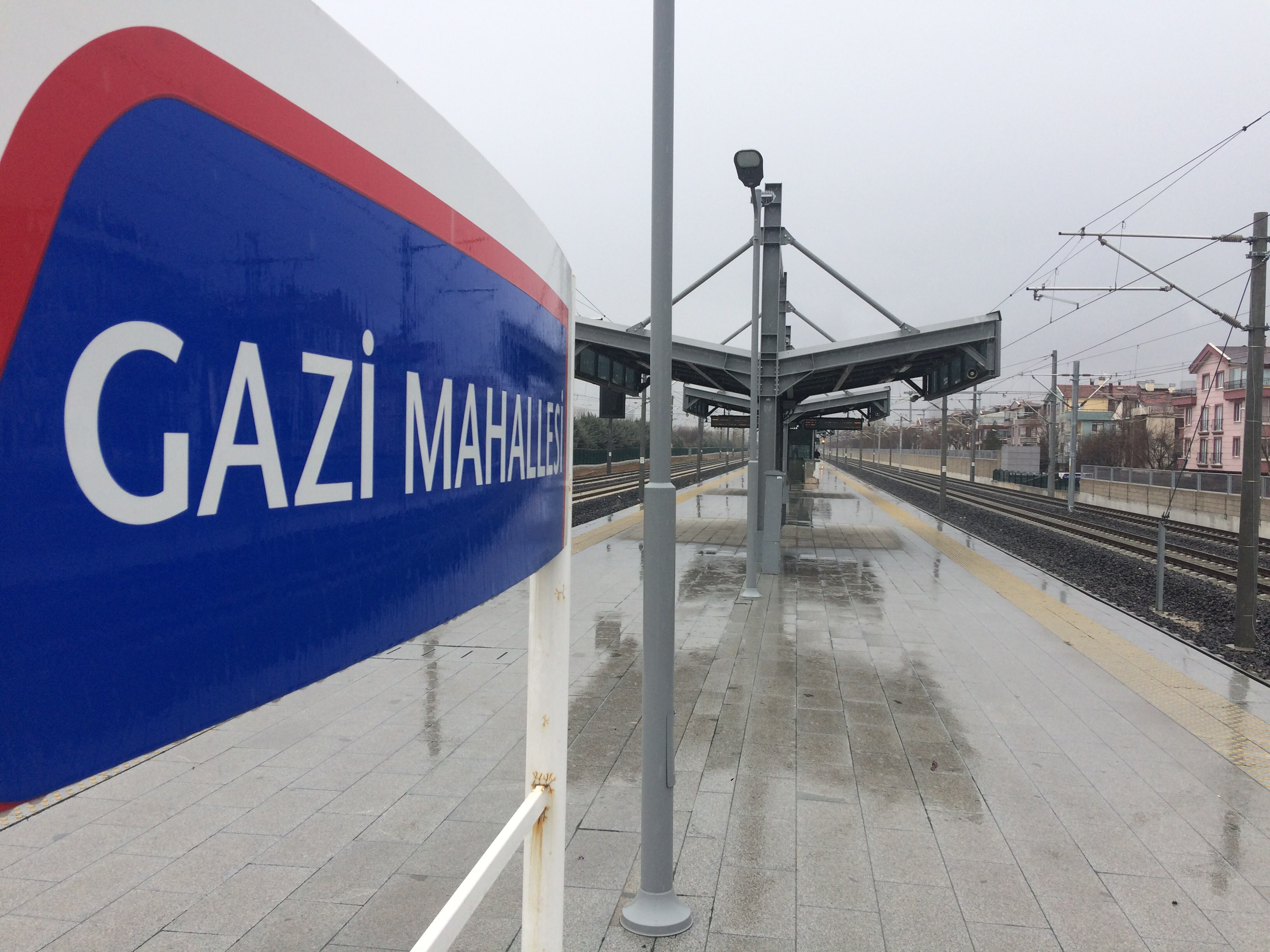

General information
- Location: Polatlı Cd., Gazi Mah., 06560; Yenimahalle, Ankara; Turkey
- Coordinates: 39.9439°N 32.8122°E
- System: TCDD Taşımacılık commuter rail station
- Owner: Turkish State Railways
- Operator: TCDD Taşımacılık
- Line: Başkentray
- Platforms: 1 island platform
- Tracks: 5

Construction
- Parking: No
- Cycle facilities: No
- Accessible: Yes

History
- Opened: 1970
- Closed: 2016-18
- Rebuilt: 2017-18

Services
Preceding station	TCDD Taşımacılık	Following station
Gazi towards Sincan	Başkentray	Hipodrom towards Kayaş
Location

Gazi Mahallesi railway station (Turkish: Gazi Mahallesi istasyonu) is a railway station in Ankara, Turkey, currently being rebuilt. The station was a stop on the Ankara suburban from 1972 to 2016 when it was closed and demolished shortly after, in order to rebuild and expand the railway. Construction of the new station began in 2017 and is expected to open on 12 April 2018.

The station is located within the neighborhood (Turkish: Mahalle) of Gazi in Yenimahalle.

Gazi Mahallesi was originally built in 1970 by the Turkish State Railways, when the railway from Ankara to Sincan was double-tracked. It entered service in 1972. In 1984, a second platform was added when the railway was expanded to four tracks. This platform was disused in the late 1990s but remained until early 2012 when it was demolished.
