= Havadurağı railway station =

Railway station in Ankara, Turkey

HAVADURAĞI
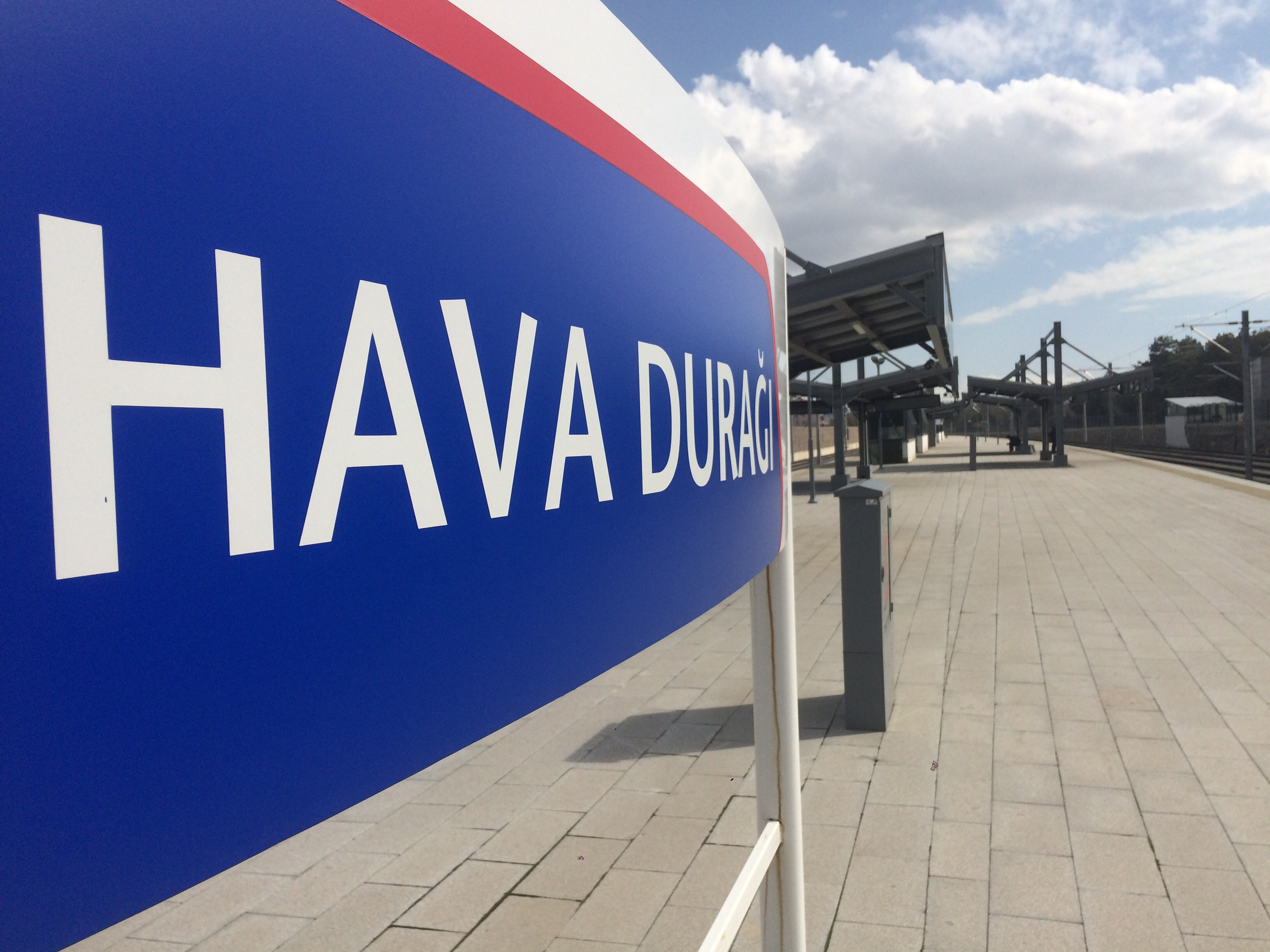

General information
- Location: Dumlupınar Blv., Erler Mah. 06790; Etimesgut, Ankara; Turkey
- Coordinates: 39.9422°N 32.6881°E
- System: TCDD Taşımacılık commuter rail station
- Owner: Turkish State Railways
- Operator: TCDD Taşımacılık
- Line: Başkentray
- Platforms: 1 island platform
- Tracks: 5

Construction
- Parking: No
- Cycle facilities: No
- Accessible: Yes

History
- Opened: 1930s
- Closed: 2016-18
- Rebuilt: 2017-18

Services
Preceding station	TCDD Taşımacılık	Following station
Etimesgut towards Sincan	Başkentray	Yıldırım towards Kayaş
Track layout
Location

Havadurağı railway station (Turkish: Havadurağı istasyonu) is a railway station in Ankara, Turkey, currently being rebuilt. The station was a stop on the Ankara suburban from the 1930s to 2016 when it was closed and demolished shortly after, in order to rebuild and expand the railway. Construction of the new station began in 2017 and is expected to open on 12 April 2018.

The station opened in 1930s, when the Etimesgut Air Base entered service. The station gets its name from the Air Base, as Havadurağı literally translates to Air stop.

The new station consists of an island platform serving two tracks, within a five-track railway. South of the platform are two tracks for mainline and YHT high-speed trains, while the track north of the platform is a bi-directional track for freight trains and equipment moves.
