= Hipodrom railway station =

Railway station in Ankara, Turkey

HİPODROM
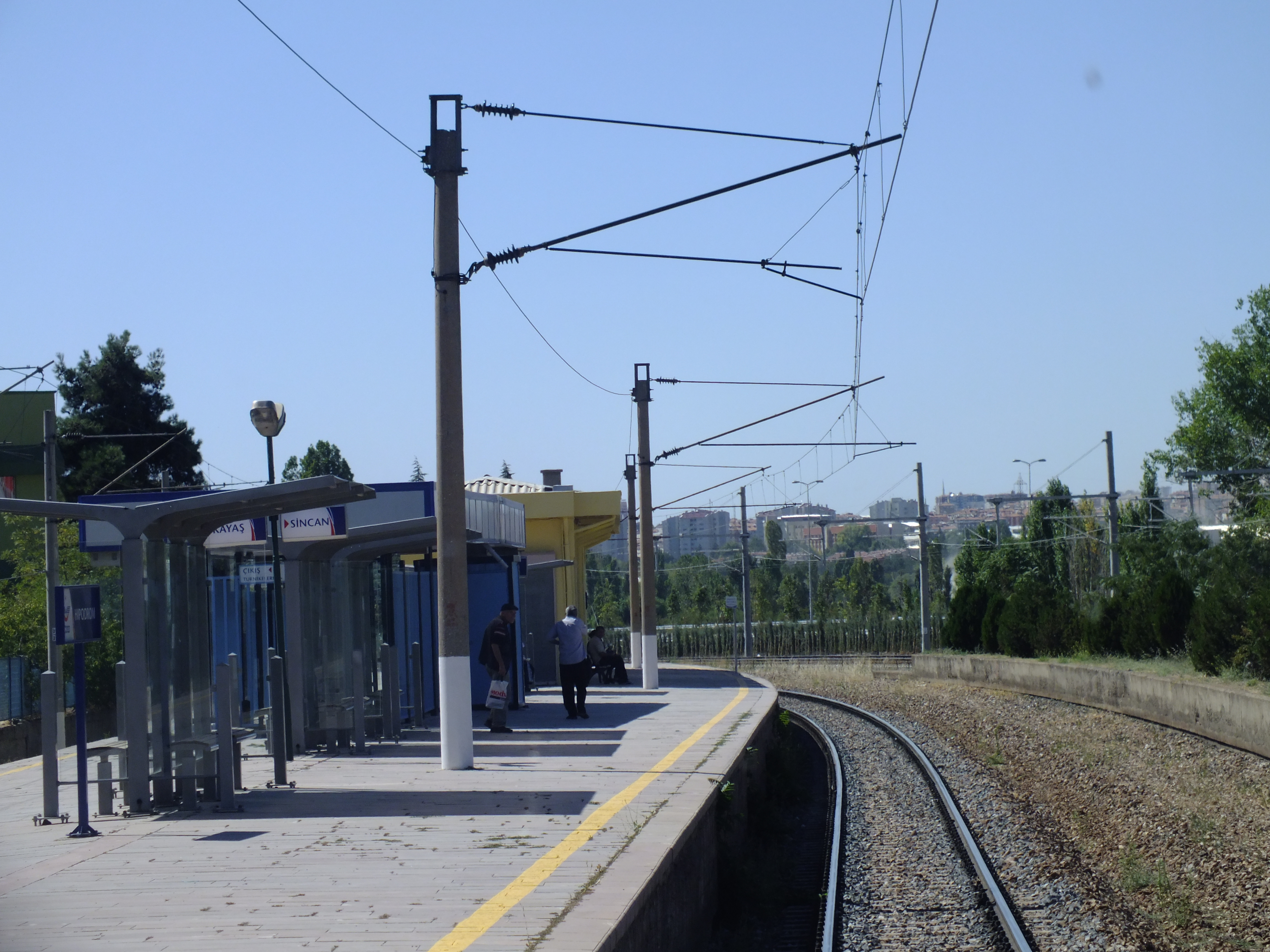
- Hipodrom station in 2013, before reconstruction.

General information
- Coordinates: 39.564203°N 32.493347°E
- System: TCDD
- Owner: Turkish State Railways
- Lines: Ankara-Polatlı Regional; Sincan-Kayaş Commuter Line
- Platforms: 1
- Tracks: 2
- Connections: EGO Bus

Construction
- Structure type: At-grade
- Accessible: Yes

History
- Opened: 1972
- Electrified: 1972 (25 kV AC)
- Former names: Hastane

Services
Preceding station	TCDD Taşımacılık	Following station
Gazi Mahallesi towards Sincan	Başkentray	Gar towards Kayaş
Location

Hipodrom is a railway station in Ankara, Turkey. The station is served by the Sincan-Kayaş Commuter Line and the Ankara-Polatlı Regional. Hipodrom was formerly known as Hastane.
