= Yenişehir railway station =

YENİŞEHİR
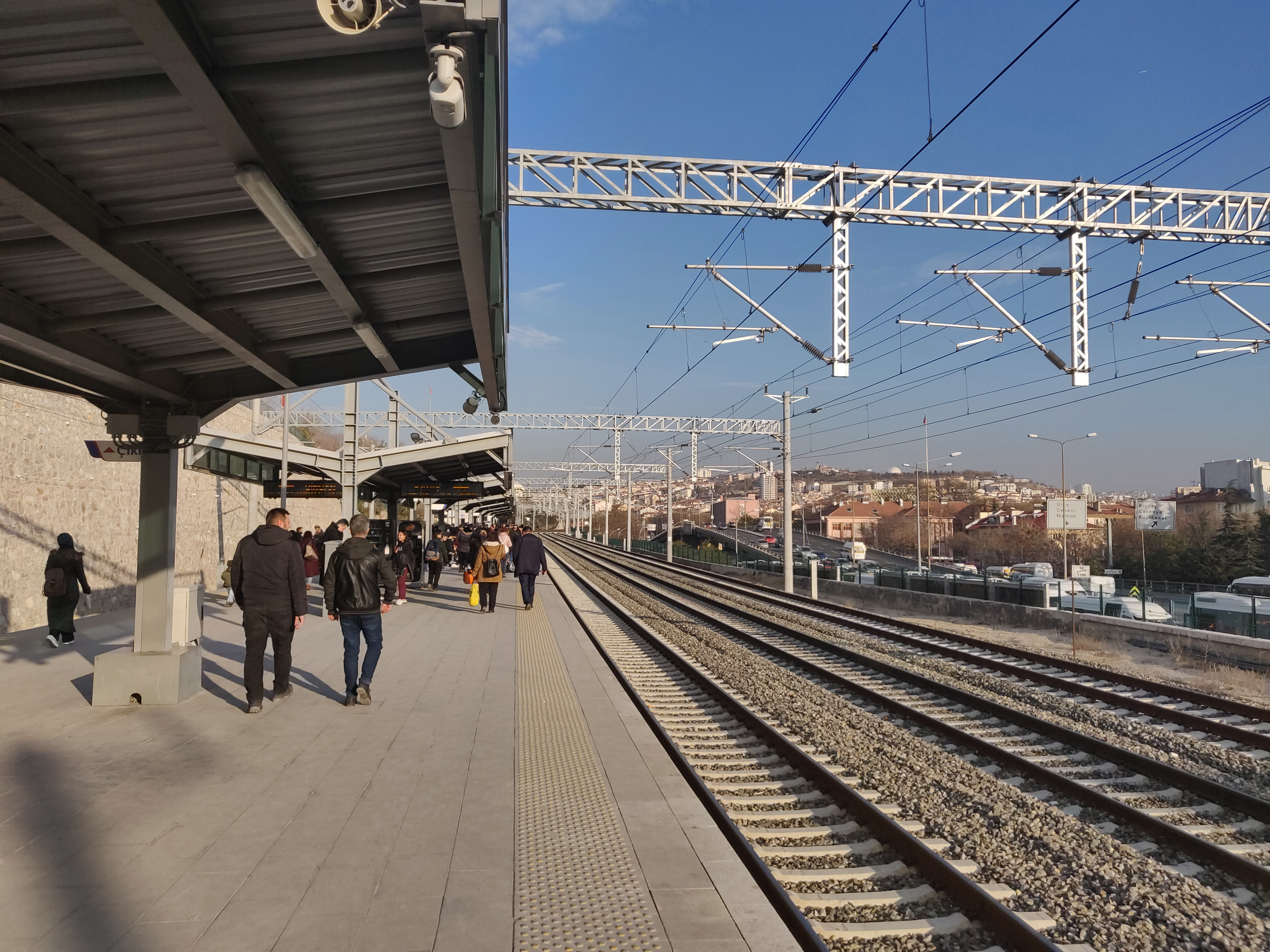
- Looking east; the right-most two tracks are used for intercity/high-speed rail service.

General information
- Location: Atatürk Blv., Hacettepe, 06230; Altındağ/Ankara; Turkey
- Coordinates: 39.9290°N 32.8551°E
- System: TCDD commuter rail station
- Owner: Turkish State Railways
- Operator: TCDD Taşımacılık
- Line: Başkentray
- Platforms: 1 island platform
- Tracks: 2
- Connections: Ankara Metro; M1 at Sıhhiye; EGO Bus: 160, 203, 252, 253, 256-2, 261, 263 266, 263-2, 263-3, 279, 279-2, 284, 285-2, 286, 312, 312-1, 313, 314, 317-3, 318, 319, 320, 322, 322-4, 335, 339-3, 345, 355, 355-4, 357, 361, 377, 381, 395, 407, 408, 427, 427-3, 492, 542, 530-3

Construction
- Parking: No
- Cycle facilities: No
- Accessible: Yes

History
- Opened: 1972
- Closed: 2016-17

Services
Preceding station	TCDD Taşımacılık	Following station
Gar towards Sincan	Başkentray	Kurtuluş towards Kayaş
Location

Yenişehir railway station (Turkish: Yenişehir istasyonu) is a railway station on the Başkentray commuter rail line in Ankara, Turkey. The station is located a few blocks north of Kızılay Square, on the corner of Atatürk and Celal Bayar Boulevards and is the first station east of Ankara station, written as Gar on public transport maps. Yenişehir station was originally opened in 1972 with the inauguration of the Ankara suburban commuter service. In July 2016, the station was demolished and rebuilt and was scheduled to open on 12 April 2018.

Connection to the M1 line of the Ankara Metro is available.

== Gallery ==
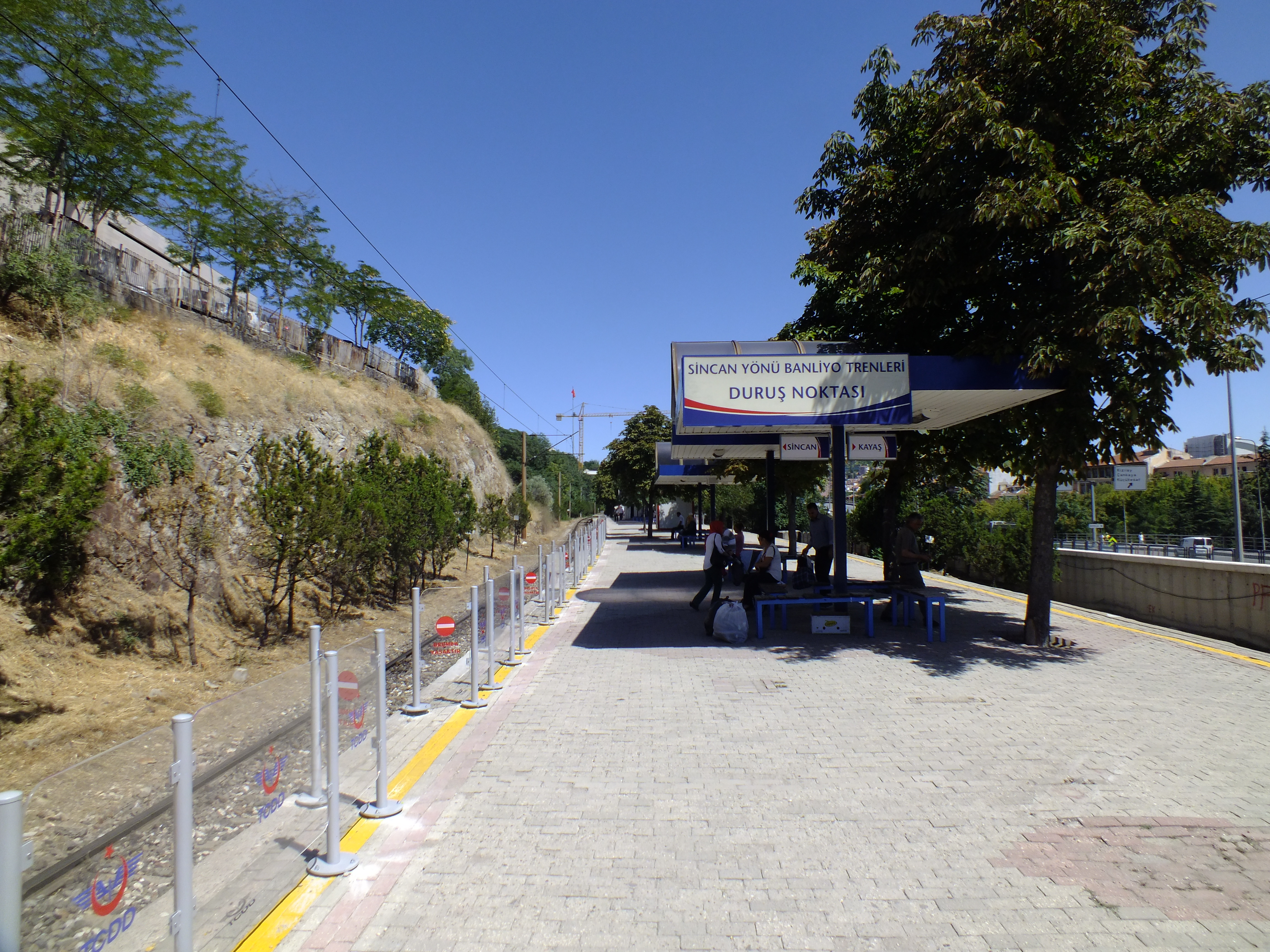
Yenişehir station in 2013, before it was rebuilt.

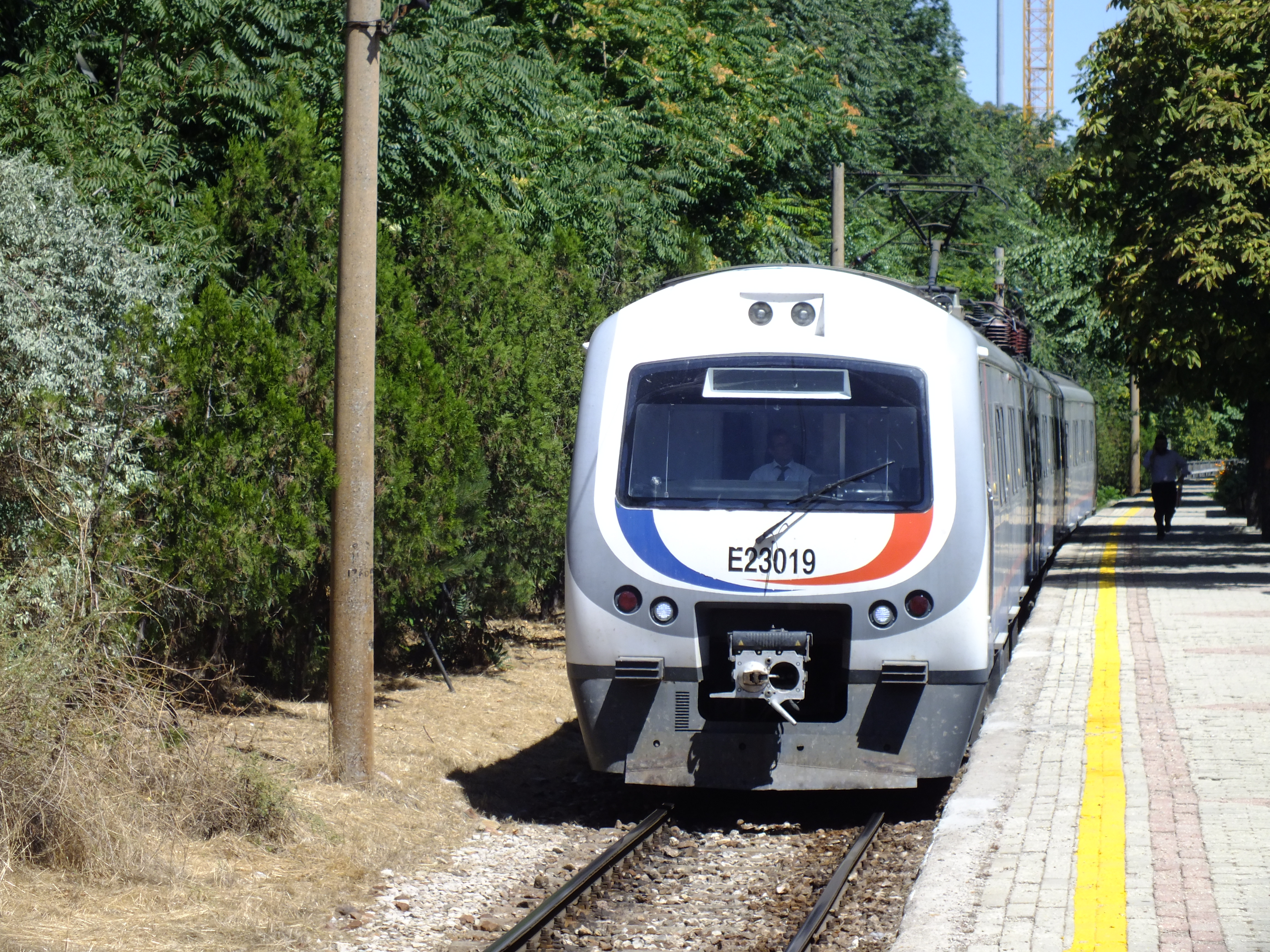
A westbound train entering the station in August 2013.

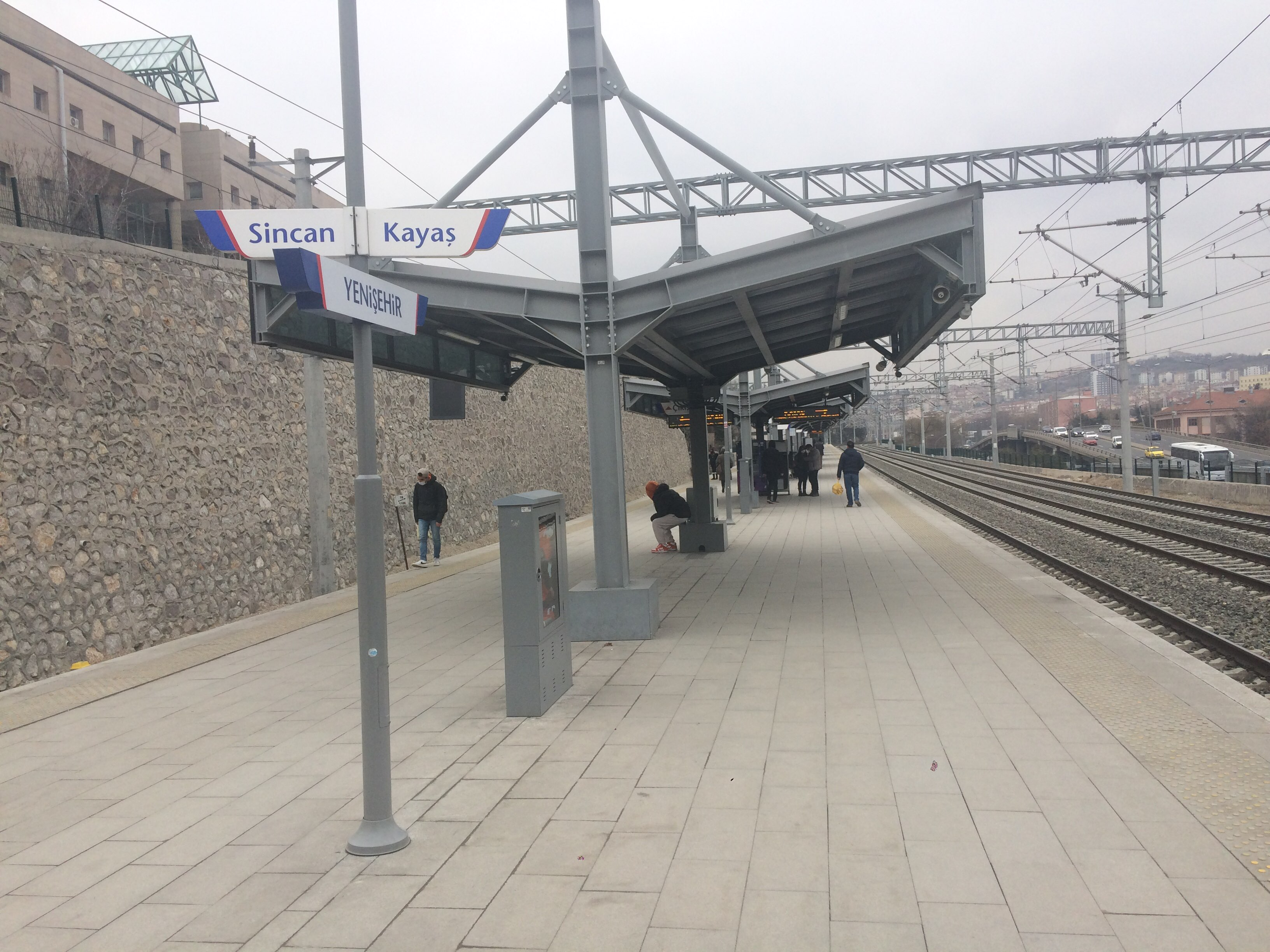
Another view of the new station.
