= Gazi railway station =

Railway station in Ankara, Turkey

GAZİ
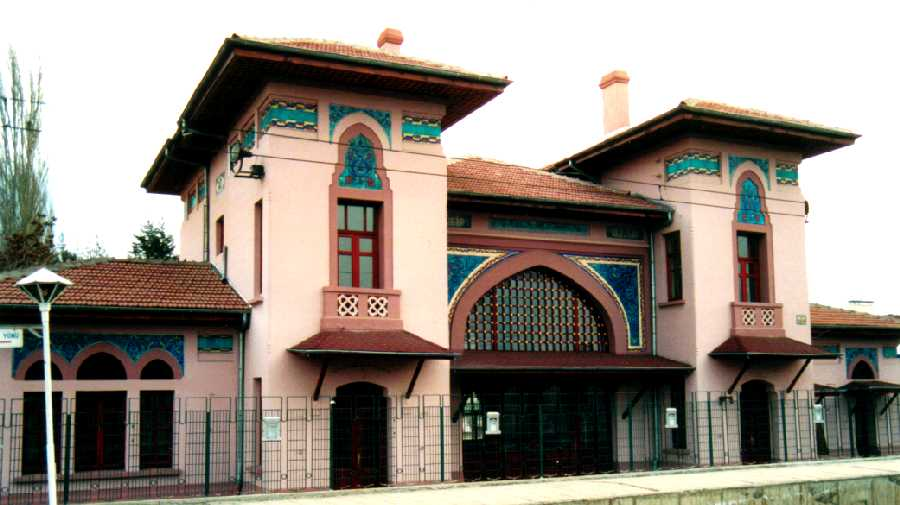
- The station building in January 2001.

General information
- Location: Silahtar Cd., Gazi Mah. 06990; Etimesgut/Ankara; Turkey
- Coordinates: 39.9400°N 32.7961°E
- System: TCDD commuter rail station
- Owner: Turkish State Railways
- Operator: TCDD Taşımacılık
- Line: Temporarily suspended
- Platforms: 2 (1 side platform, 1 island platform)
- Tracks: 4

Construction
- Architect: Burhaneddin Tamcı
- Architectural style: Turkish Neoclassical

History
- Opened: 1926
- Closed: 2016-17

Services
| Preceding station | TCDD Taşımacılık | Following station |
|---|---|---|
| Marşandiz towards Sincan | Başkentray | Gazi Mahallesi towards Kayaş |
Location

Gazi station is a historic station in Ankara, Turkey. Built in 1926 by the Turkish State Railways, the station building is notable for its Turkish Neoclassical architectural style, designed by Turkish architect Burhaneddin Tamcı. Situated next to the Atatürk Forest Farm, the station was a stop on the Ankara suburban and Ankara-Polatlı Regional trains until 2016 when all train service (except high-speed) was suspended within Ankara. The station platforms are currently being rebuilt as part of TCDD's Başkentray project. The new station is expected to open on 12 April 2018.
