= Behiçbey railway station =

Railway station in Ankara, Turkey

BEHİÇBEY
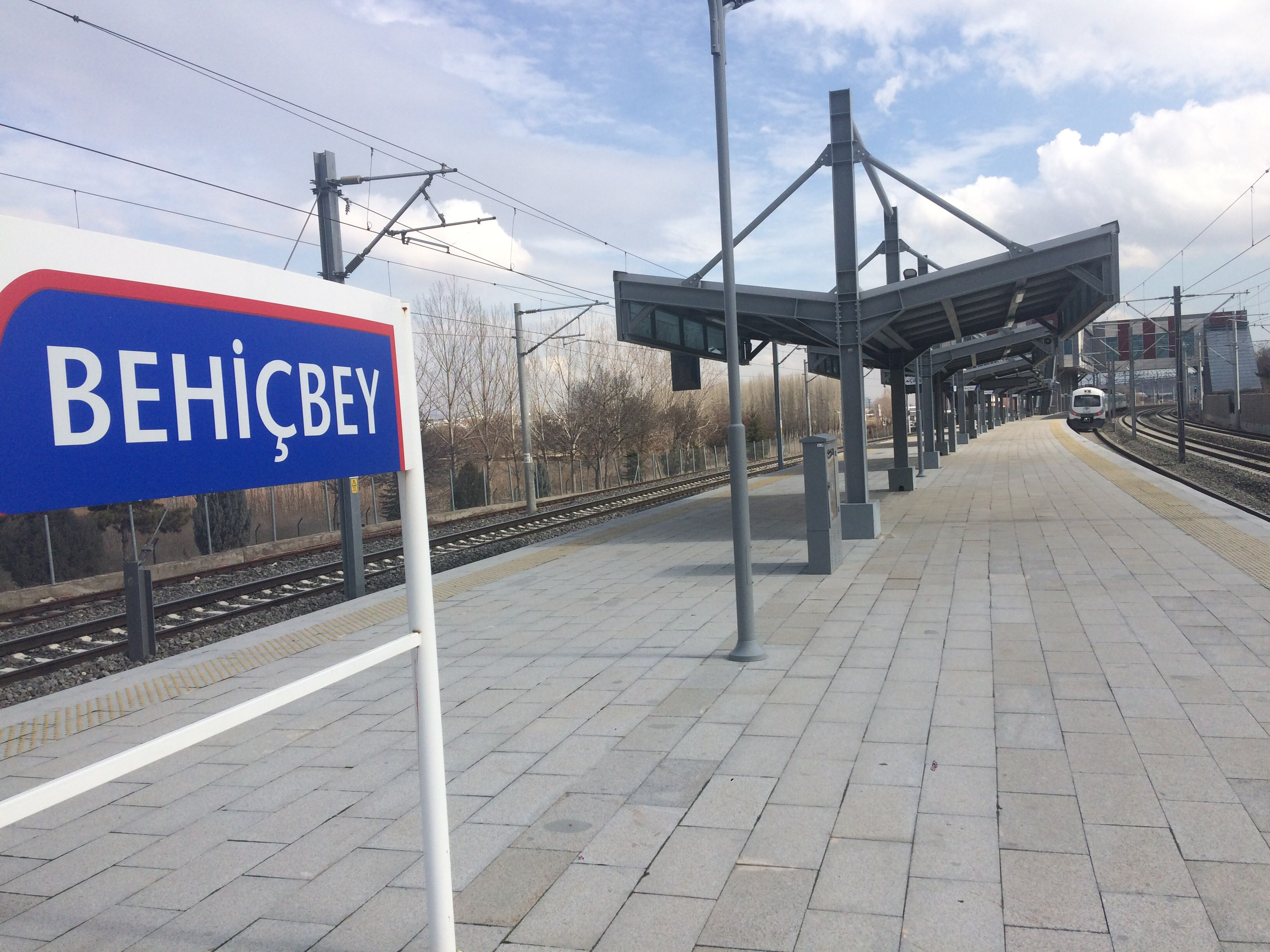

General information
- Location: Bahçekapı Mah. 06797; Etimesgut, Ankara; Turkey
- Coordinates: 39.9314°N 32.7501°E
- System: TCDD Taşımacılık commuter rail station
- Owner: Turkish State Railways
- Operator: TCDD Taşımacılık
- Line: Başkentray
- Platforms: 1 island platform
- Tracks: 5

Construction
- Parking: No
- Cycle facilities: No
- Accessible: Yes

History
- Opened: 1930s
- Closed: 2016-18
- Rebuilt: 2017-18
- Former names: Bahçekapı

Services
Preceding station	TCDD Taşımacılık	Following station
Yıldırım towards Sincan	Başkentray	Marşandiz towards Kayaş
Track layout
Location

Behiçbey railway station (Turkish: Behiçbey istasyonu) is a railway station in Ankara, Turkey, currently being rebuilt. The station was a stop on the Ankara suburban from the 1930s to 2016 when it was closed and demolished shortly after, in order to rebuild and expand the railway. Construction of the new station began in 2017 and is expected to open on 12 April 2018.

Behiçbey station was originally built in the early 1930s by the Turkish State Railways as Bahçekapı railway station. In 1961, the station was renamed Behiçbey in honor of Behiç Erkin, the first minister of railways in Turkey.

The new station consists of an island platform serving two tracks, within a five-track railway. South of the platform are two tracks for mainline and YHT high-speed trains, while the track north of the platform is a bi-directional track for freight trains and equipment moves.
