= Ankara railway station =

Primary rail station of Ankara, Turkey

Ankara
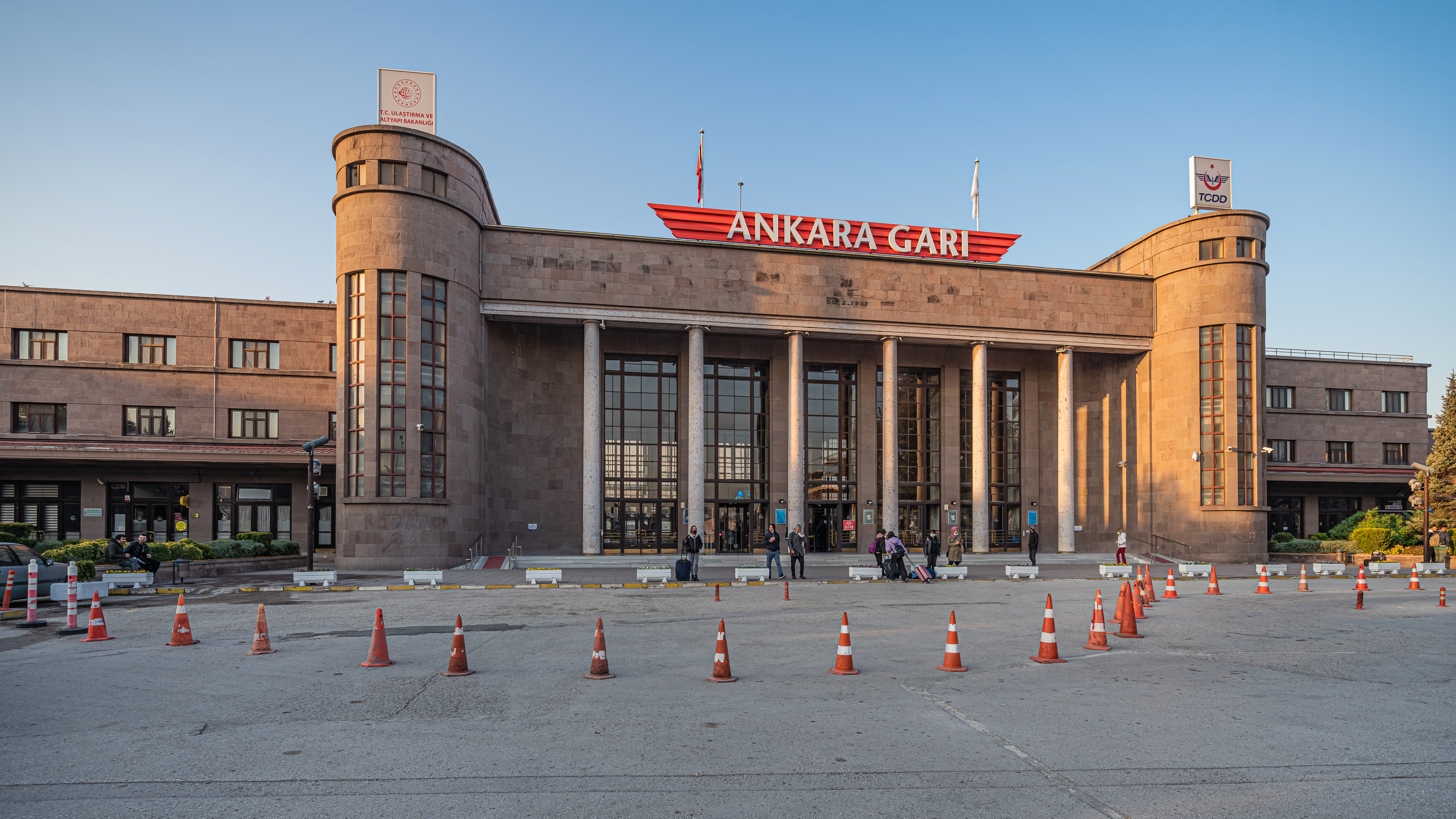
- Ankara railway station

General information
- Location: Hipodrom Cd., Anafartalar Mah. 06050; Altındağ, Ankara; Turkey
- Coordinates: 39.9364°N 32.8438°E
- System: TCDD Taşımacılık high-speed, intercity and commuter rail station
- Owner: Turkish State Railways
- Operator: TCDD Taşımacılık
- Lines: Istanbul-Ankara railway Ankara-Kars railway Ankara-Istanbul high-speed railway Ankara-Sivas high-speed railway
- Platforms: 6 (1 side platform, 5 island platforms)
- Tracks: 13
- Connections: Ankara Metro: Ankaray at Maltepe; M4 at Gar; EGO Bus: 157-3, 202-3, 204, 222, 254, 257, 268, 269, 277, 285, 288, 288-2, 288-6, 352, 354, 354-3, 369, 394, 394-3, 397, 398-3, 404-1, 410-2, 411-2, 415-2, 415-6, 418-2, 461-1, 482-2, 482-6, 522

Construction
- Structure type: At-grade
- Parking: Yes
- Accessible: Yes
- Architect: Şekip Akalın
- Architectural style: Art Deco

Other information
- Station code: 2503

History
- Opened: 31 December 1892; 133 years ago
- Rebuilt: 1937; 89 years ago (Art Deco station); 2014–2018; 8 years ago (Platforms)
- Electrified: 1972 (25 kV AC)

Services
Preceding station	TCDD Taşımacılık	Following station
Eryaman towards Istanbul Halkalı	Yüksek Hızlı Tren	Terminus
Eryaman towards Karaman	Yüksek Hızlı Tren	Terminus
Terminus	Yüksek Hızlı Tren	Kayaş towards Sivas
Sincan towards Istanbul Halkalı	Ankara Express	Terminus
Sincan towards İzmir (Basmane)	İzmir Blue Train	Terminus
Terminus	Eastern Express	Kayaş towards Kars
Terminus	Lake Van Express	Kayaş towards Tatvan
Terminus	Southern Express	Kayaş towards Kurtalan
Terminus	4 Sep Express	Kayaş towards Malatya
Sincan towards Polatlı	Ankara–Polatlı	Terminus
Hipodrom towards Sincan	Başkentray	Yenişehir towards Kayaş
Future services
Preceding station	TCDD Taşımacılık	Following station
Polatlı YHT towards İzmir (Alsancak)	Yüksek Hızlı Tren	Terminus
Former services
Preceding station	Turkish State Railways	Following station
Sincan towards Istanbul	Capital Express	Terminus
Sincan towards Istanbul	Republic Express	Terminus
Sincan towards Istanbul	Fatih Express	Terminus
Sincan towards Istanbul	Anatolian Express	Terminus
Location

Ankara railway station (Turkish: Ankara Garı) is the main railway station in Ankara, Turkey, and is a major transportation hub within the city. The station is on the rail corridor which connects east and west Turkey, which is high speed between Istanbul and Sivas. Ankara station is also a hub for YHT high-speed trains, with its own exclusive platforms and concourse. TCDD Taşımacılık also operates intercity train service to Kars, Tatvan and Kurtalan as well as Başkentray commuter rail service.

Located within the historic Ulus quarter, the station is a landmark of the city. In 2016, a new building was opened above the YHT platforms known as Ankara Tren Garı (ATG). The ATG building serves as a hub for high-speed rail with its own concourse containing information and tickets booths, waiting rooms and a VIP lounge, and is connected to the rest of the station via a skybridge.

== History ==
=== Ottoman Empire period (1892–1922) ===
The original builder, the Chemins de Fer Ottomans d'Anatolie (CFOA), was engaged in shipping war materials to the fronts in Palestine and Mesopotamia during World War I. Therefore, between 1914 and 1918 the Ankara station had no passenger service and very little freight service. The CFOA fell under British military control after the war, but the Turkish Nationalists captured Ankara and parts of the CFOA. During the Turkish Independence War, CFOA transported troops from Ankara, as the newly named capital of Turkey, to the front near Eskişehir.

=== Turkish Republic period (1922–present) ===
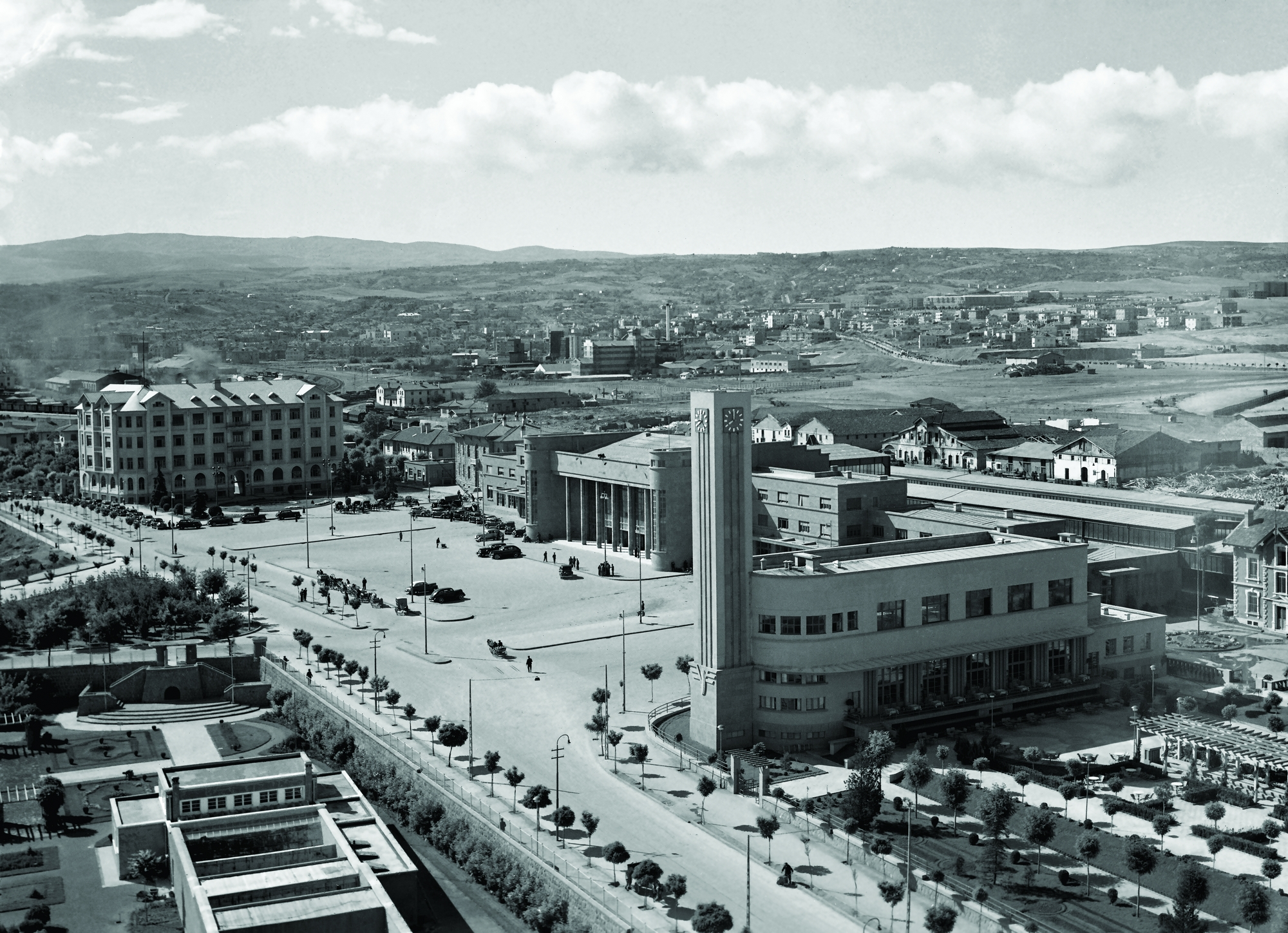
View of 19 May Square and the Ankara Railway Station taken in the 1940s

After the Turkish independence war ended, the passenger train services from Istanbul to Ankara resumed. The CFOA, now under Turkish control, finally opened the line to Kayseri and Ankara was no longer the terminus. CFOA was then acquired by the Turkish State Railways (TCDD) on June 1, 1927, and Ankara station was placed under TCDD control. In 1927 the Anatolian Express was inaugurated as a premier overnight train from Istanbul to Ankara operated by the Compagnie Internationale des Wagons-Lits (CIWL). The current Art deco building was built in 1937 by Turkish architect Şekip Akalın. As TCDD completed rail lines to other cities, new train services from Ankara such as the 9th of September Express (1939) to İzmir, the Eastern Express (1939) to Kars, and the Southern Express (1944) to Diyarbakır and Kurtalan made Ankara station one of the busiest stations in Turkey. In 1972, the station, along with the track between Sincan and Kayaş, were electrified with 25 kV AC catenary for the Ankara Suburban Railway. In 1993 the Istanbul-Ankara line was fully electrified. In 2009 a high-speed train service operated from Ankara to Eskişehir.

The 2015 Ankara bombings occurred on 10 October 2015 at 10:04 local time (EEST) in Ankara. Two bombs were detonated outside the entrance of the Ankara Central railway station, killing more than 105 and injuring more than 400 people. The attack is the deadliest of its kind in Turkey's modern history.

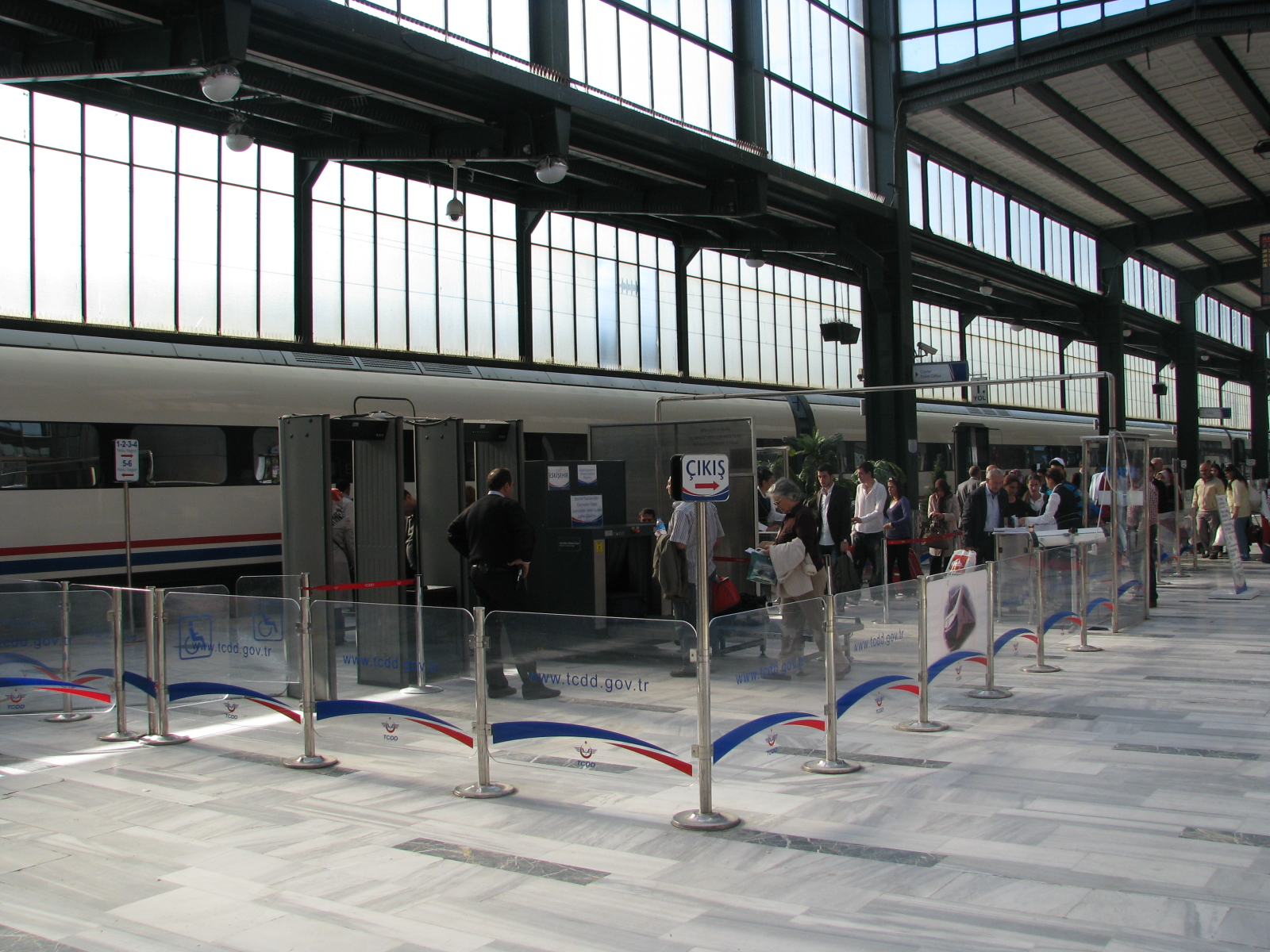
A TCDD HT65000 at the Ankara Central Station 2009 to 2016

The TCDD Open Air Steam Locomotive Museum was opened next to the station in the 1990s, but was relocated in 2014 due to the construction of the Ankara Tren Garı.

== Operations ==
Ankara station has generally been the exchange point between train services in the west and in the east, although trains to the far east of Turkey would originate from Istanbul until 2011. With the exception of commuter rail service, all trains either originate or terminate at the station, continuing Ankara's role as a rail hub in Turkey. TCDD Taşımacılık (TCDDT) operates mainline intercity trains (mostly overnight service) west to Istanbul and İzmir and east to Kars, Tatvan and Kurtalanalong with regional service to Polatlı. Since the opening of Turkey's first high-speed railway in 2009, Ankara has become the main hub for high-speed trains in the country. High-speed Yüksek Hızlı Tren (YHT) service operates frequent service to Istanbul, via Eskişehir, and Konya. However, service is expected to increase with the opening of the high-speed railway to Sivas and Karaman towards the end of 2021, with future service to Afyonkarahisar and İzmir expected to begin in 2023.

=== Tracks ===
Ankara station has 6 platforms with 13 tracks. The station platforms are divided into three areas, each hosting different train service. The platforms are connected via a skybridge.

- Tracks 1-3 are used for intercity and regional service. Intercity trains to Istanbul, İzmir, Kars, Tatvan and Kurtalan along with regional trains to Polatlı arrive and depart from these tracks. A side platform and an island platform allow access to the tracks.
- Tracks 4-5 are used for freight trains passing through Ankara, along with the occasional equipment move from Marşandiz Yard. Freight trains run mostly at night or late evening with some service mid-day. This is done to minimize interference with passenger rail service.
- Tracks 6-7 are for Başkentray commuter service to Sincan and Kayaş. An island platform services both tracks however access to this platform requires the payment of a fare, using the AnkaraKart.
- Tracks 8-13 are exclusively for high-speed train service. These tracks are also indoors as they sit underneath the Ankara Tren Garı building. Platforms here connect directly into the high-speed rail concourse, however the rest of Ankara station can be accessed via the skybridge.

G	Ground level	Exit/entrance, parking, buses
P Platform level
P Platform level	Platform 1
P Platform level	Track 1	← Main line and regional trains →
P Platform level	Track 2	← Main line and regional trains →
P Platform level	Platform 2
P Platform level	Track 3	← Main line and regional trains →
P Platform level	Track 4	Freight trains
P Platform level	Track 5	Freight trains
P Platform level	Track 6	← Başkentray toward Sincan
P Platform level	Platform 3
P Platform level	Track 7	Başkentray toward Kayaş →
P Platform level	Track 8	← Yüksek Hızlı Tren toward Istanbul, Konya or Sivas →
P Platform level	Platform 4
P Platform level	Track 9	← Yüksek Hızlı Tren toward Istanbul, Konya or Sivas →
P Platform level	Track 10	← Yüksek Hızlı Tren toward Istanbul, Konya or Sivas →
P Platform level	Platform 5
P Platform level	Track 11	← Yüksek Hızlı Tren toward Istanbul, Konya or Sivas →
P Platform level	Track 12	← Yüksek Hızlı Tren toward Istanbul, Konya or Sivas →
P Platform level	Platform 6
P Platform level	Track 13	← Yüksek Hızlı Tren toward Istanbul, Konya or Sivas →

== One of Turkey's top 50 civil engineering projects ==
The Turkish Chamber of Civil Engineers lists Ankara Central Station as one of the fifty civil engineering feats in Turkey, a list of remarkable engineering projects realized in the first 50 years of the chamber.

== Pictures ==
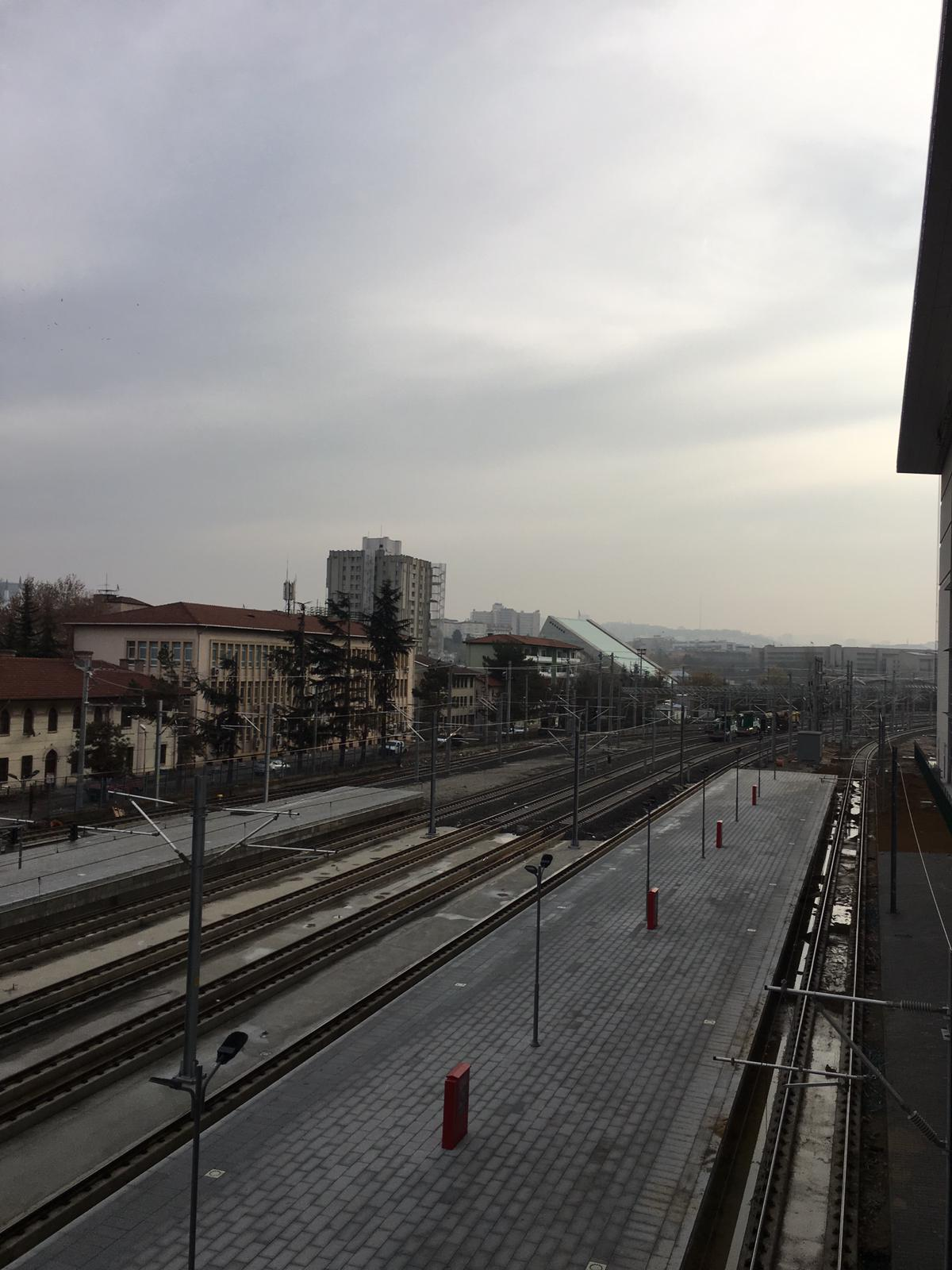
Looking east at the platforms

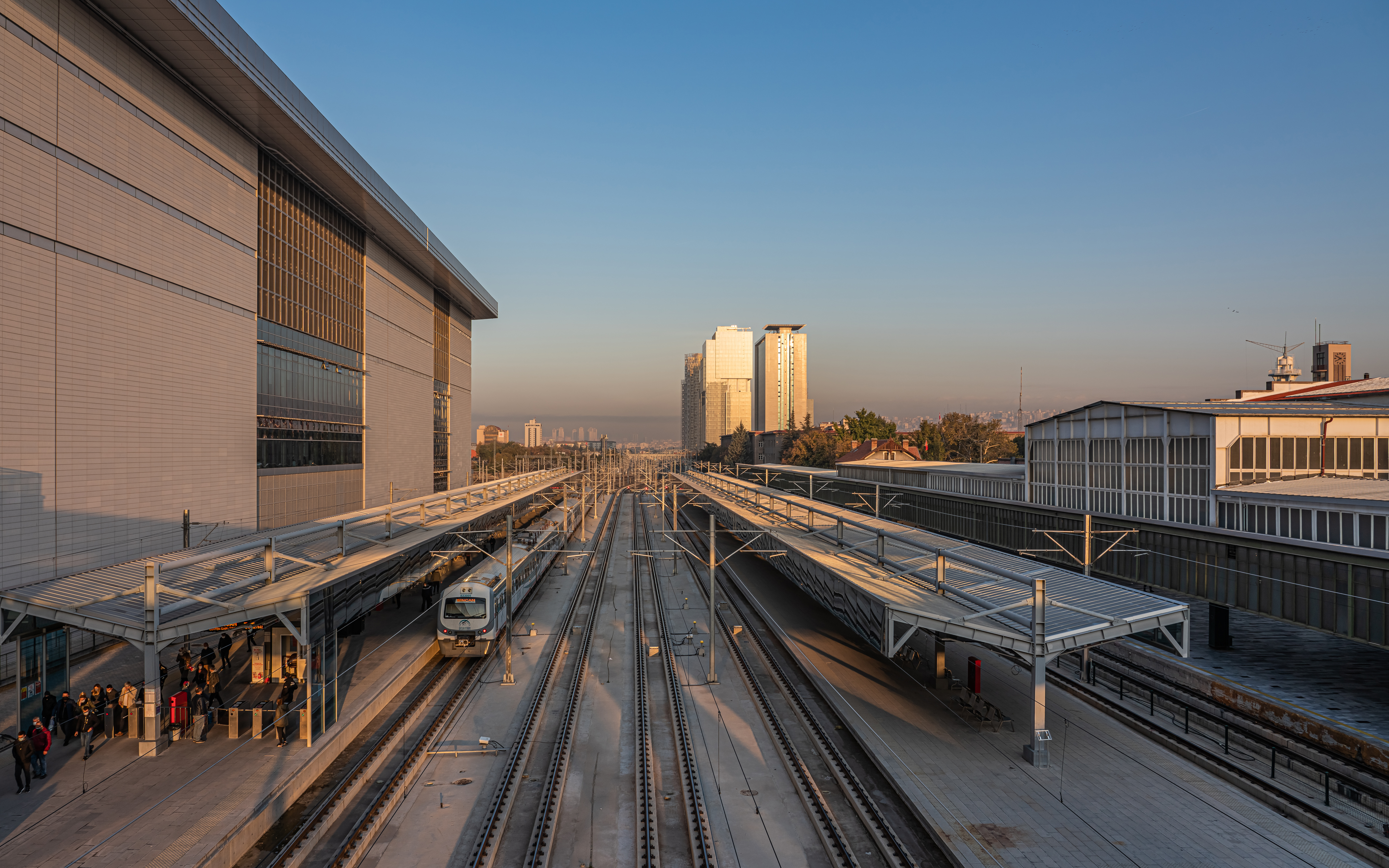
Looking west at the platforms

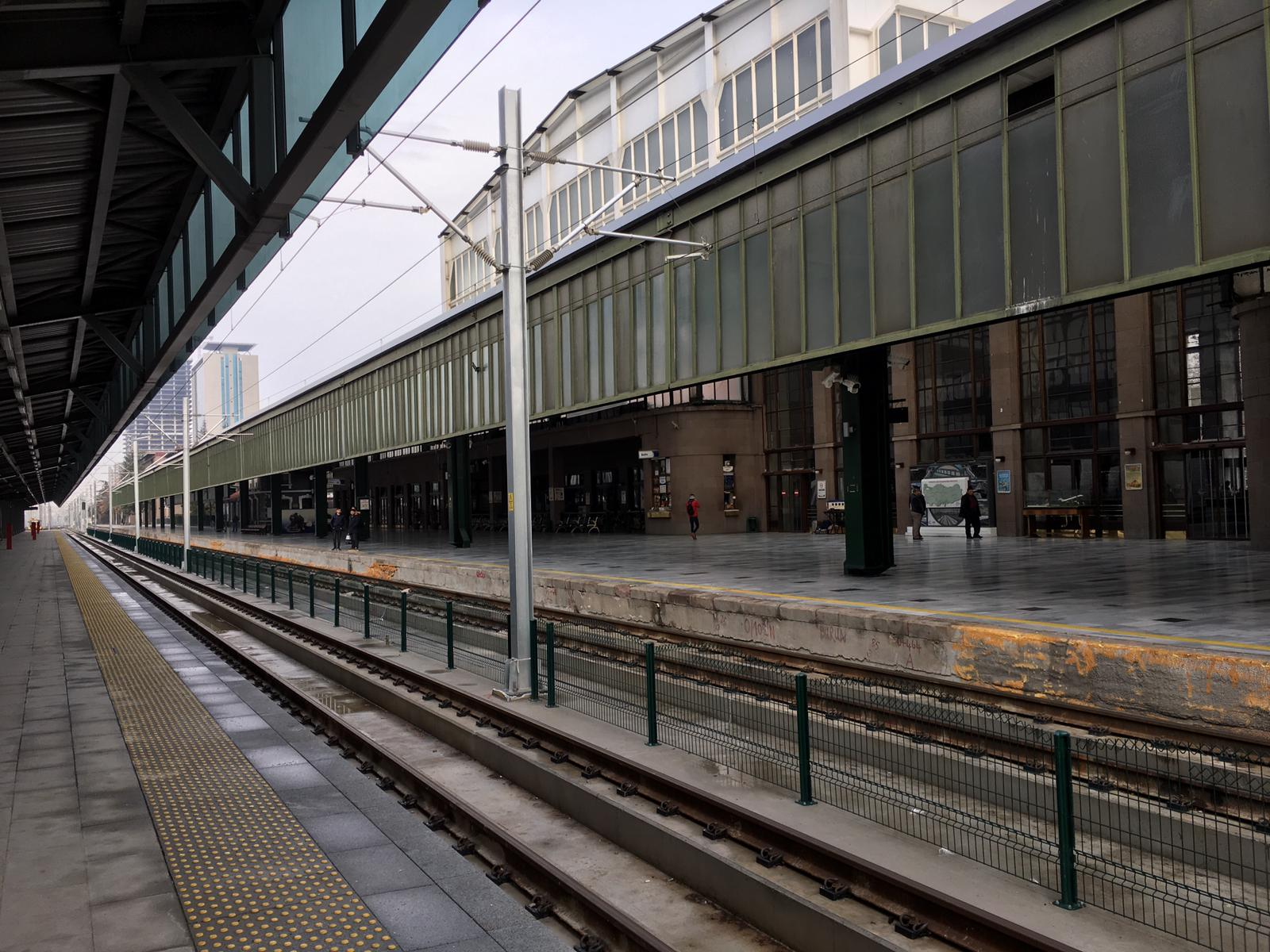
View of the Art Deco building trackside

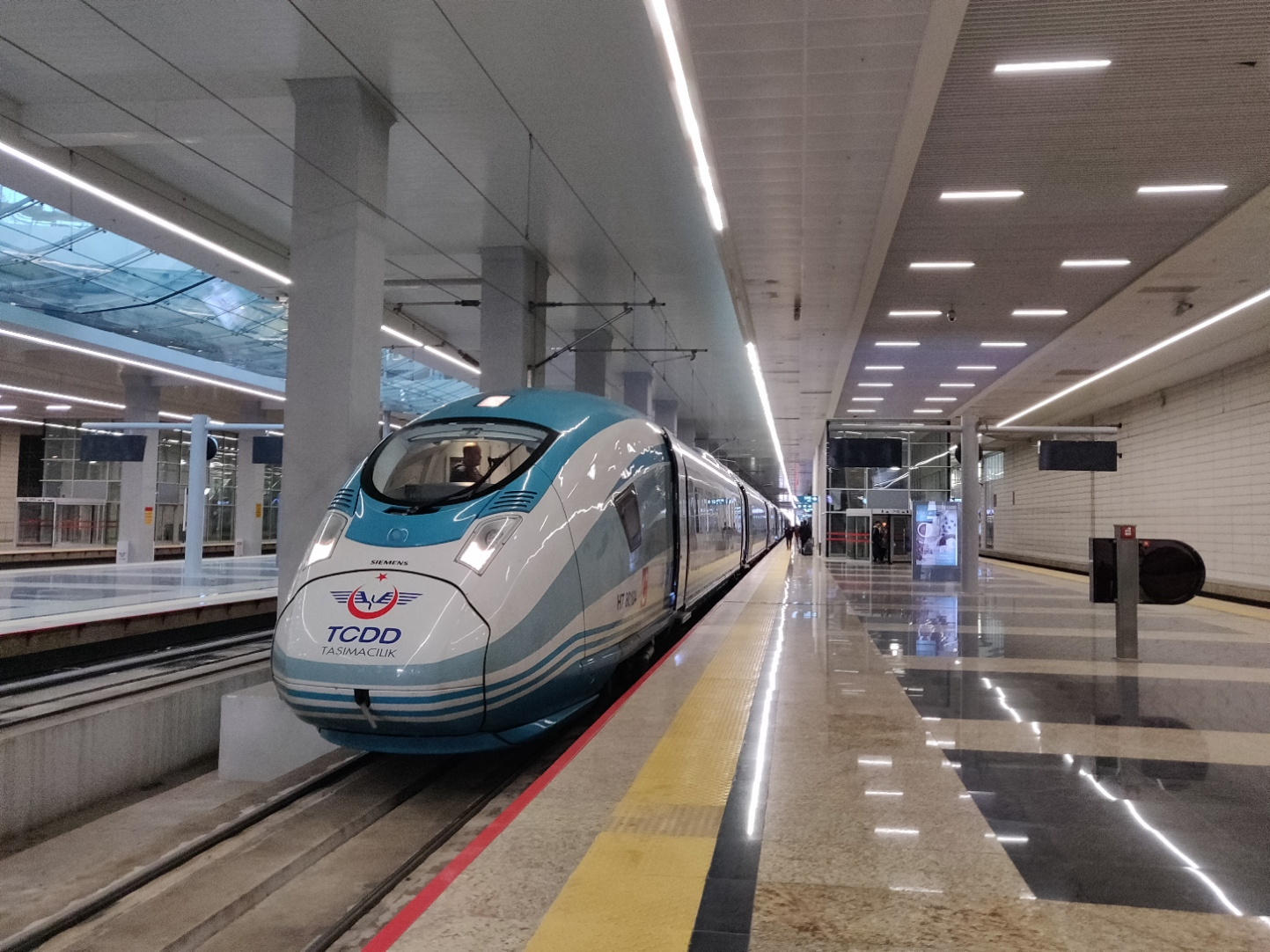
A high-speed train on the tracks below the ATG building

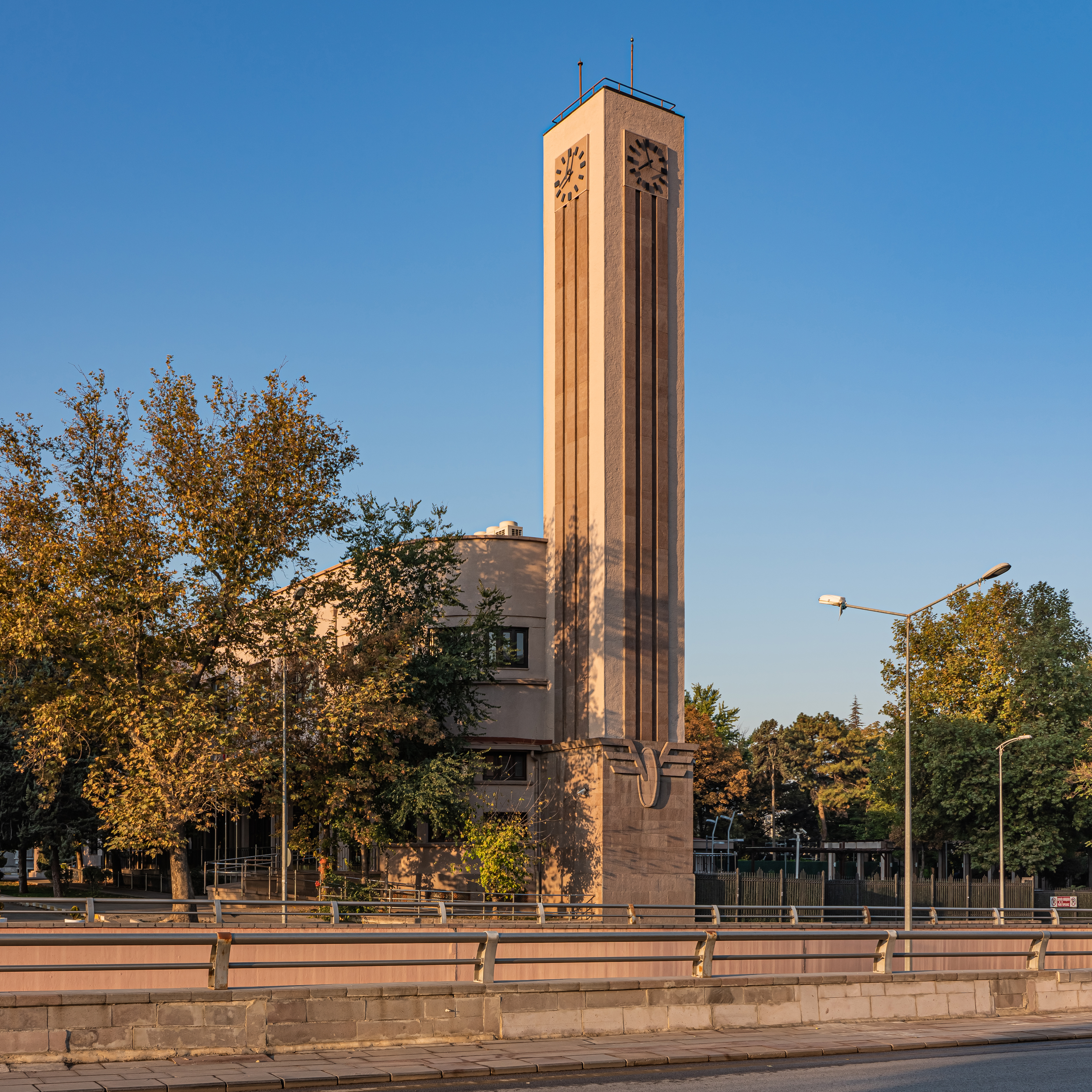
Clock tower next to the station

== See also ==
- 2015 Ankara bombings
- Ankara train collision, occurred in 2018 when a high-speed train bound Konya collided shortly after departure with a locomotive killing 9 and injuring more than 80 people
