= Cebeci railway station =

Railway station in Ankara, Turkey

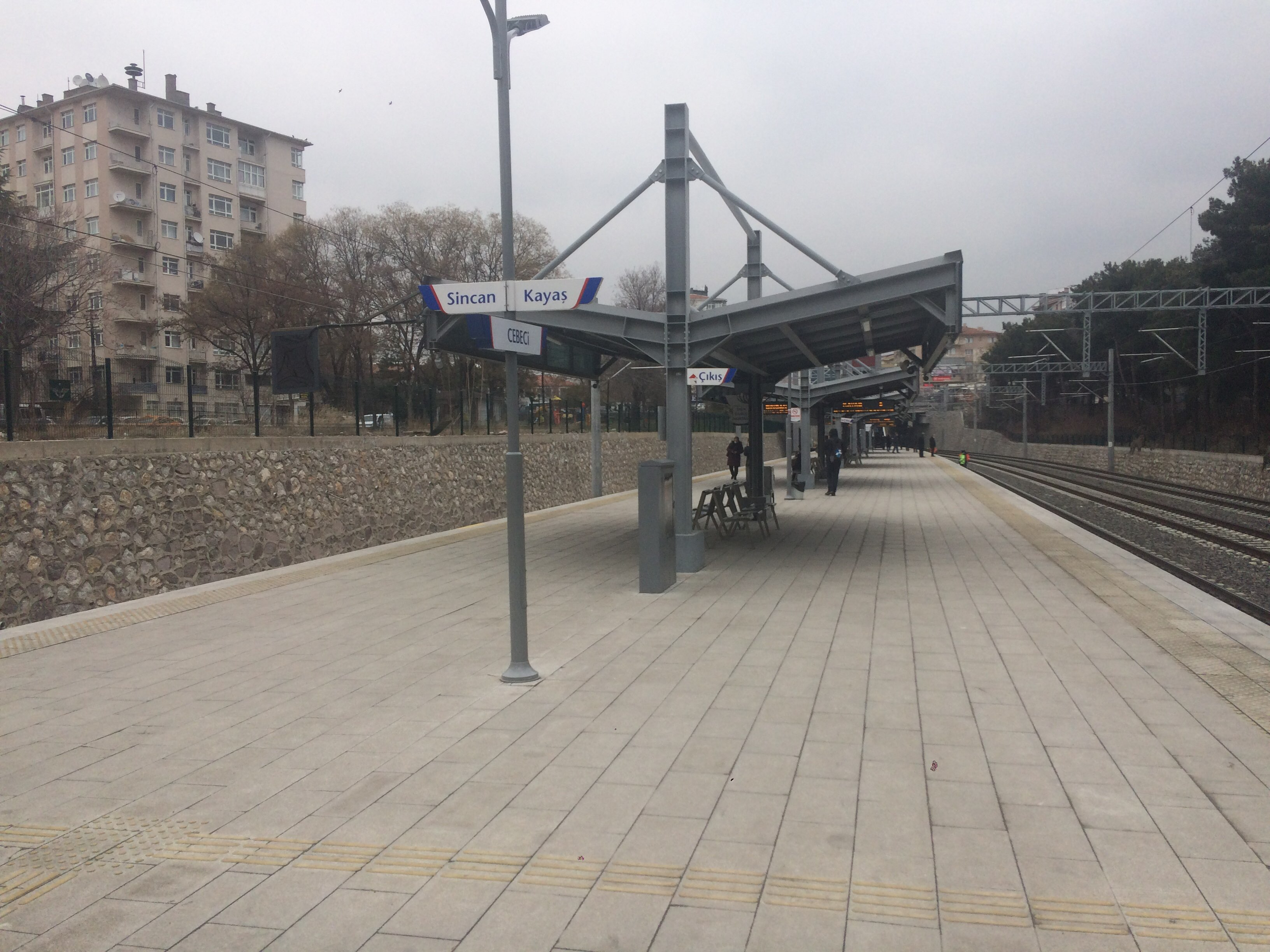
Cebeci railway station

Cebeci railway station (Turkish: Cebeci tren istasyonu) is a railway station in Ankara, Turkey, on the Başkentray commuter rail line, part of the Turkish State Railways network. Cebeci railway station was put into service in 1972 and became a stop of the Sincan-Kayaş commuter rail line. The station was closed in 2016 and then demolished, it started its reconstruction in 2017 and opened on April 12, 2018.
