= Şekip Akalın =

- Born: Sabri Şekip Akalın; 1910; Erzurum, Ottoman Empire
- Died: 1976 (aged 65–66); Ankara, Turkey
- Education: Istanbul Technical University
- Occupation: Architect
- Buildings: Ankara railway station PTT General Headquarters

Sabri Şekip Akalın (1910–1976) was a Turkish architect and engineer. His most famous building is the Art-deco Ankara railway station, which was built between 1935 and 1937. Aside from architecture, he also worked at the Ministry of Public Works, Turkish State Railways and the PTT, even designing the later's headquarters in Ankara.

== Life ==
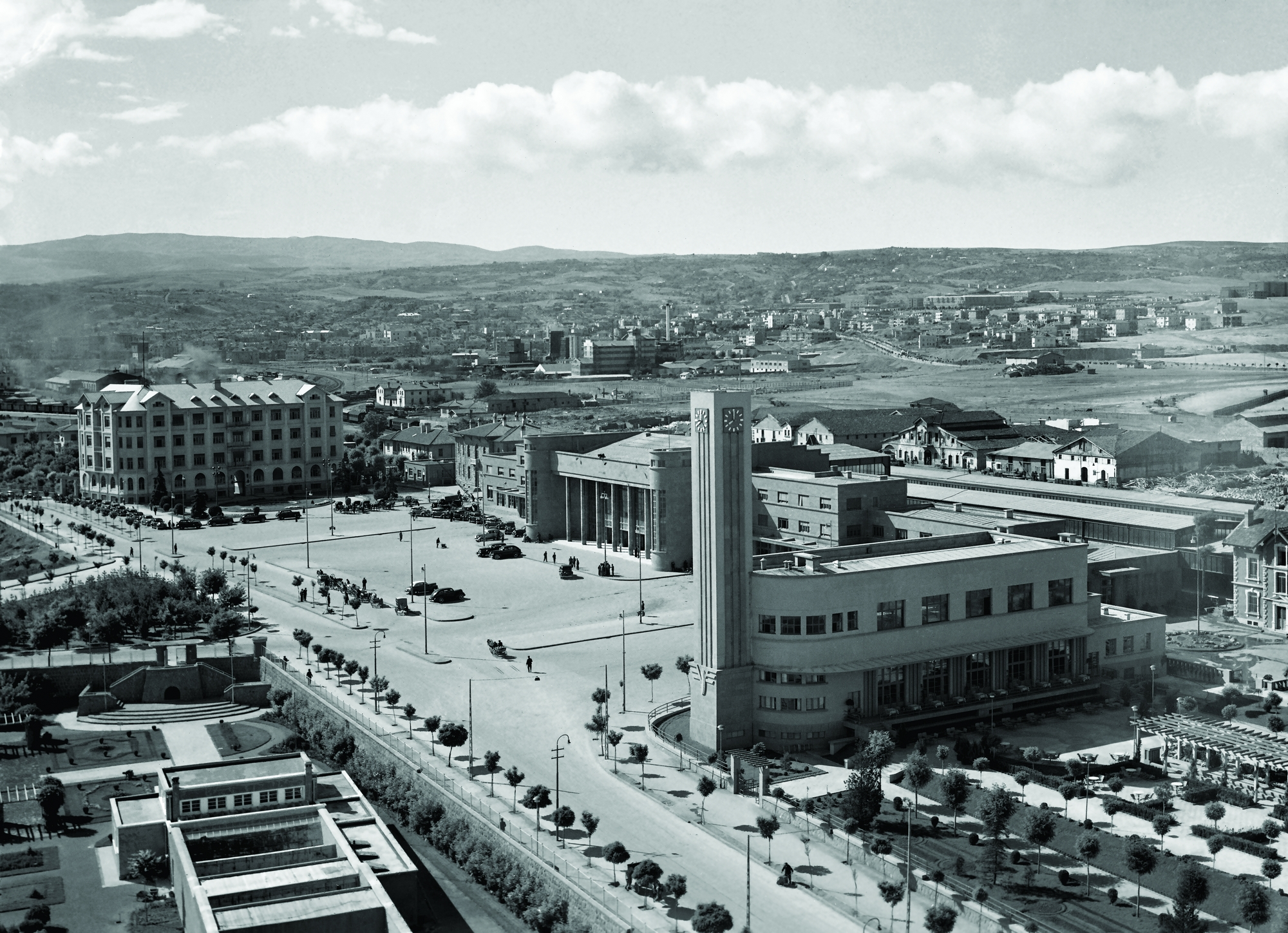
Akalın's most famous work, the Ankara railway station.

Akalın was born in 1910 in the city of Erzurum in the Ottoman Empire. Due to the outbreak of World War I in 1914, and the subsequent Russian invasion, his family moved to Ankara. After the war, Akalın moved to Istanbul and studied engineering at the Istanbul Technical University, graduating in 1934. After school, in the same year, he started working at the Ministry of Public Works in Ankara. When President Mustafa Kemal Atatürk requested that a Turkish architect be selected for the design of the new Ankara railway station building in 1935, Akalın was chosen as the project's architect at age 25. He then traveled to Europe to prepare a design for the station. He was inspired by the wave of Art deco architecture sweeping the continent as he went on to design Ankara station's building in that style.

The station was completed in 1937, when Akalın was 27 years old. He kept working at the Ministry of Public Works until 1940, when he started working at the State Railway's general headquarters until 1952. In 1960, Akalın worked at the Turkish Postal and Telegraph Organization for six years until retiring in 1966. Şekip Akalın died ten years later, in 1976, in Ankara.

== Works ==
- Ankara railway station, Ankara, Turkey
- PTT General Headquarters, Ankara, Turkey
- Atatürk Forest Farm Police Station
- Eskişehir PTT Building
- Sivas PTT Building
