= Mamak railway station =

Railway station in Mamak, Ankara, Turkey

Coordinates: 39.9314°N 32.9116°E

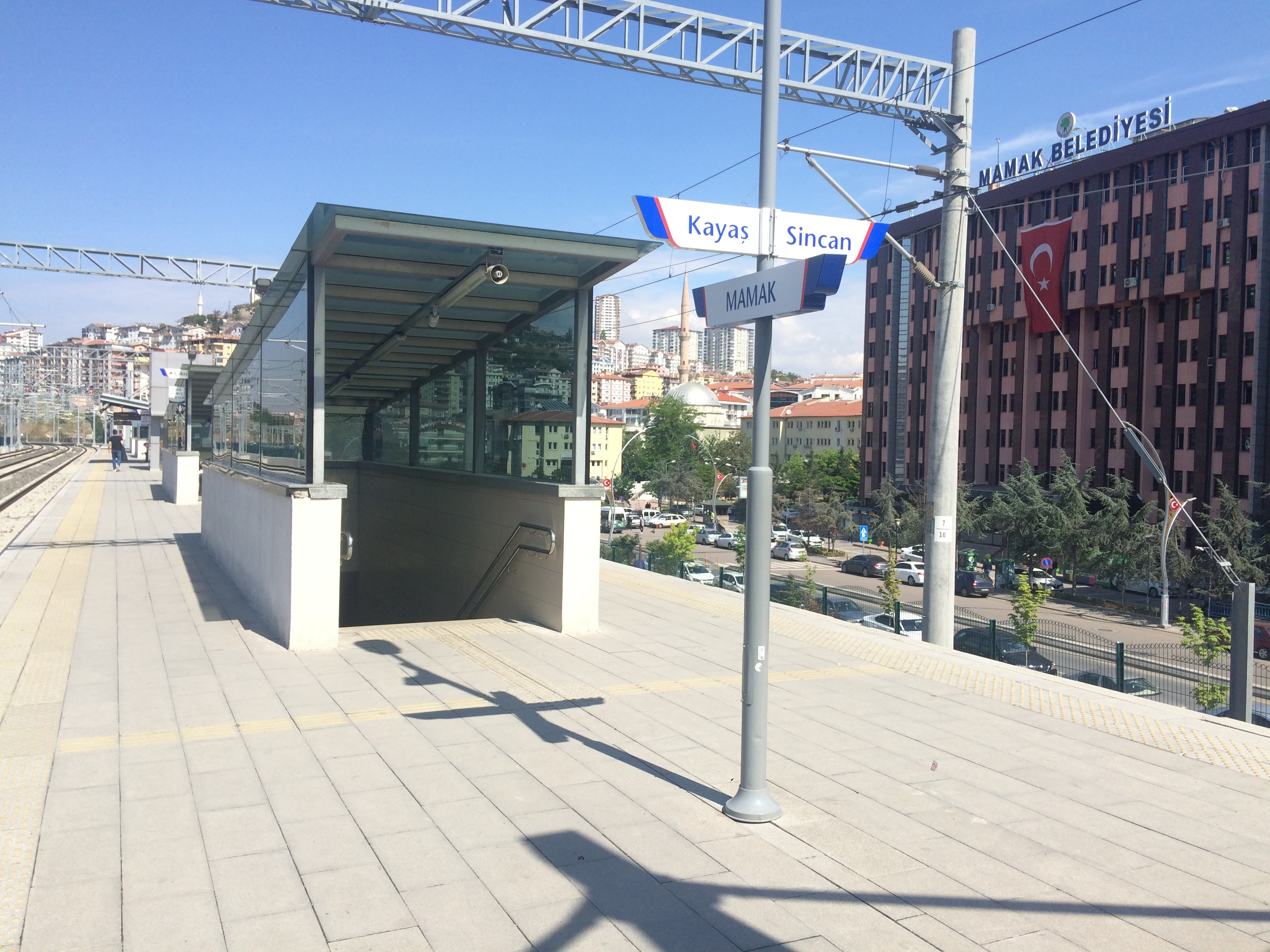
Mamak railway station

Mamak railway station is a railway station in Ankara, Turkey, on the Başkentray commuter rail line.
