= Başkentray =

Suburban commuter rail system in Ankara, Turkey

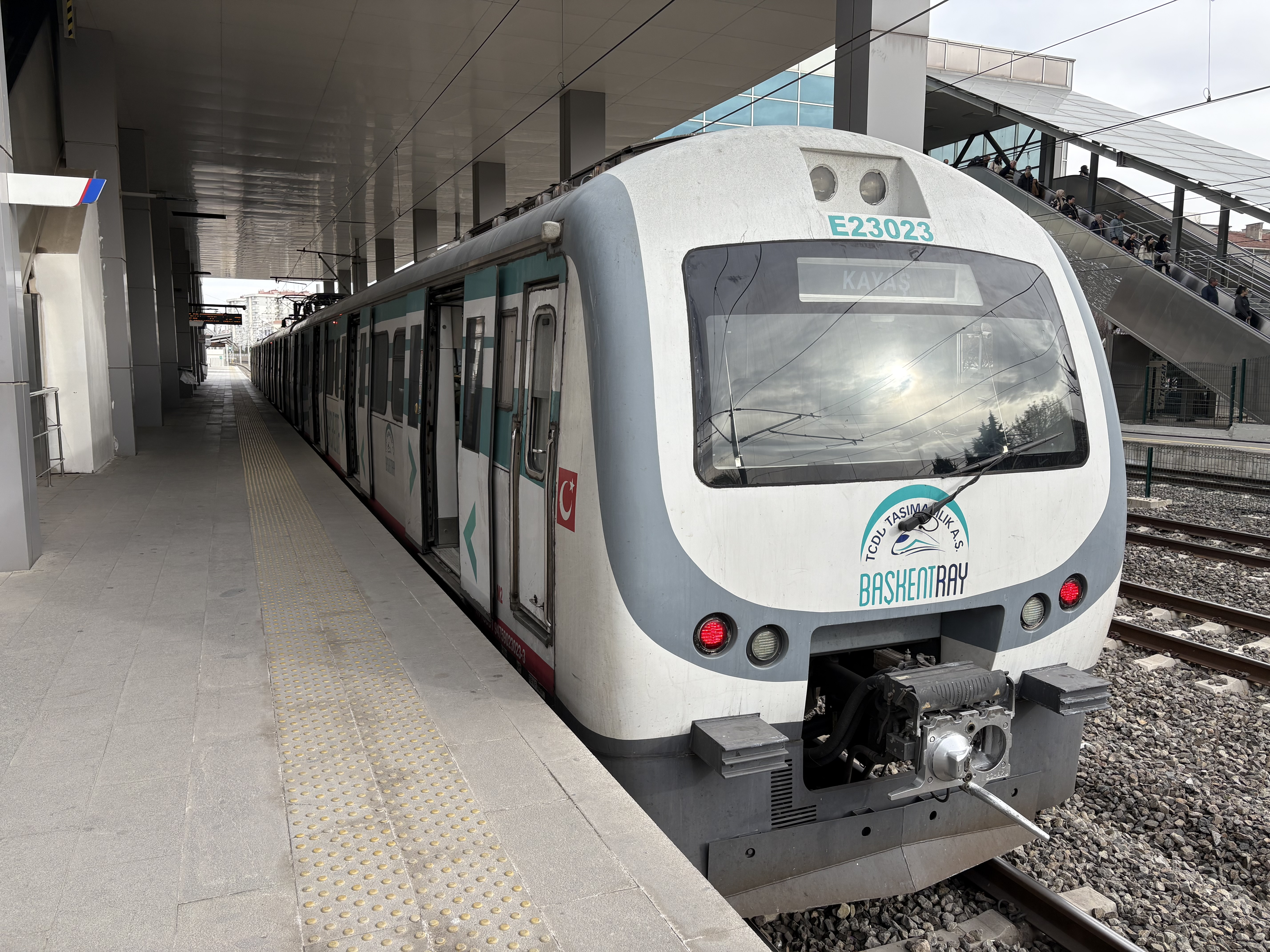
- A train of E23000 cars at Sincan station in March 2025

Overview
- Service type: Commuter rail
- Status: Operating
- Locale: Ankara, Turkey
- First service: 1972
- Current operator: TCDD Taşımacılık
- Former operator: Turkish State Railways
- Ridership: 27.7 million (2025)

Route
- Termini: Kayaş; Sincan
- Stops: 25
- Distance travelled: 37 km (23 mi)
- Average journey time: 53 minutes
- Service frequency: 15 minutes

On-board services
- Disabled access: Yes

Technical
- Rolling stock: E23000 EMUs
- Track gauge: 1,435 mm (4 ft 8 1/2 in) (standard gauge)
- Electrification: 25 kV AC
- Operating speed: 120 kilometres per hour (75 mph) maximum
- Track owner: Turkish State Railways

Başkentray (English: CapitalRail), formerly known as the Ankara suburban (Turkish: Ankara banliyösü), is a 37 km (23 mi) long commuter rail line in Ankara, Turkey. It is operated by TCDD Taşımacılık on trackage owned by the Turkish State Railways.

== History ==
The portion of the rail line from Ankara Station to Sincan was completed in 1892, and a few trains ran daily on it. TCDD took over the line that a few suburban trains were put into service. Original service was provided by a steam engine locomotive, pulling up to 3 cars. In 1972, the line was electrified, and new E14000 units were put into service. In 2010, the new E23000 sets replaced the older E14000 units.

On 11 July 2016, the line was closed for 18 months for complete rebuilding, including grade separation, rebuilding of stations to facilitate disabled access, renovation of electrical and signalling equipment, and the addition of extra tracks for separate services. The line reopened on 12 April 2018 as part of the metropolitan network, rebranded as the Başkentray and with fare payment integrated into Ankara's Başkentkart contactless ticketing system. Four of the 28 stations on the original line, Subayevleri, Motor Fabrikası, Gülveren and Topkaya, did not reopen. Additionally, Emirler station was demolished and replaced with a new station located 300 metres (984 ft 3 in) west known as Eryaman YHT Garı.

== Route ==
Başkentray operates on a 37.472 km (23.284 mi) long line with 24 stations between Sincan and Kayaş on the Istanbul-Haydarpaşa-Ankara and Ankara–Kars railway lines . It was implemented by improving the Sincan-Kayaş Suburban Train line. The districts through which the line passes are Sincan, Etimesgut, Yenimahalle, Altındağ, Çankaya, and Mamak

== Services ==
Trains depart daily between 06:00 and 21:00 every 15 minutes, and between 21:00 and 23:00 every 30 minutes in both directions. On weekdays, trains depart between 07:00 and 08:00 on the Sincan-Kayaş route and between 08:00 and 08:30 on the Kayaş-Sincan route every 10 minutes in both directions. The journey takes approximately 49 minutes.

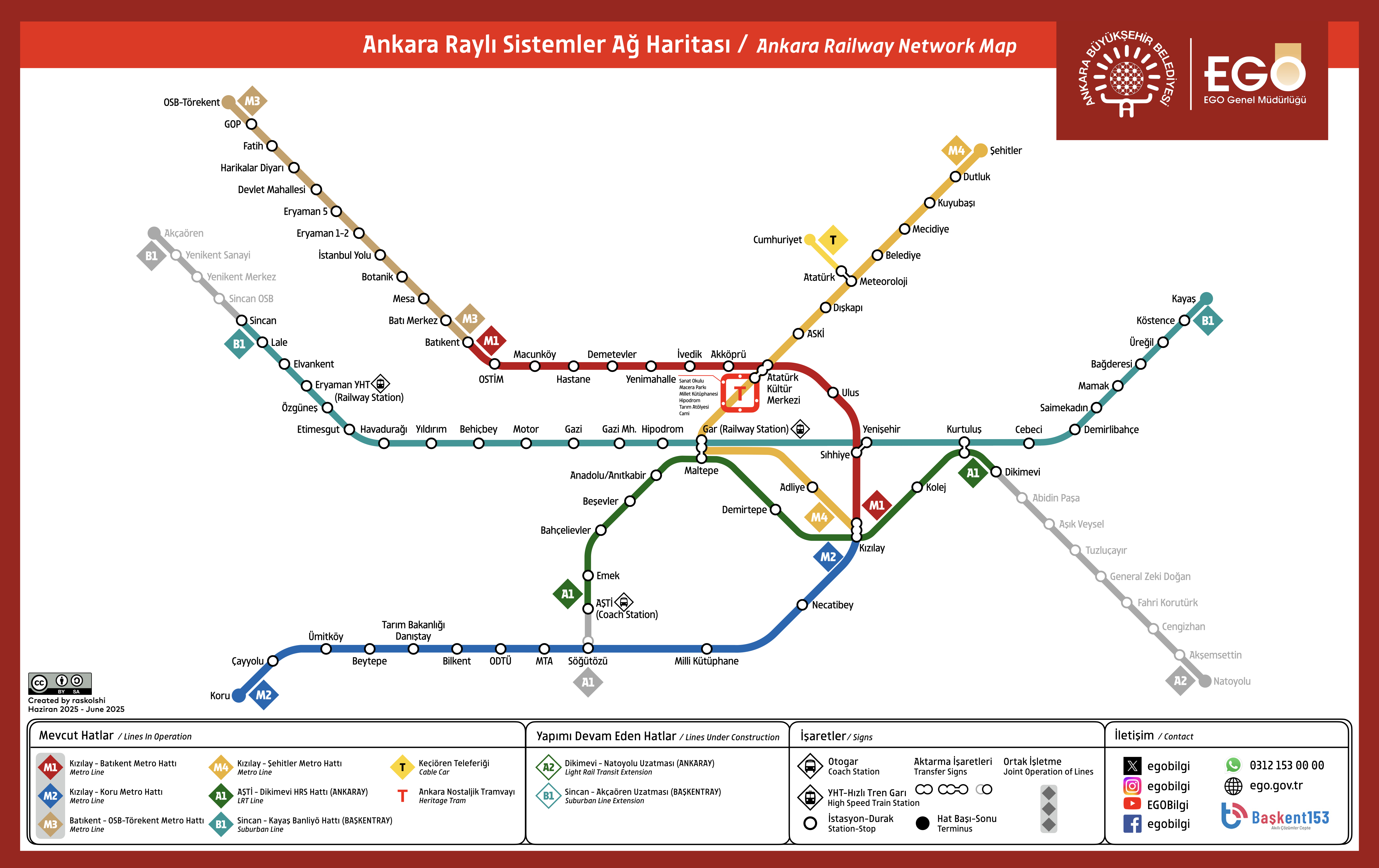
Ankara Railway map

== Stations ==
- Sincan
- Lale
- Elvankent
- Eryaman YHT
- Özgüneş
- Etimesgut
- Havadurağı
- Yıldırım
- Behiçbey
- Marşandiz
- Gazi
- Gazi Mahallesi
- Hipodrom
- Ankara railway station (transfer to: Gar station of Ankara Metro: M4 line and Maltepe station of Ankara Metro: Ankaray (A1) line)
- Yenişehir (transfer to: Sıhhiye station of Ankara Metro: M1 line)
- Kurtuluş (transfer to: Ankara Metro: Ankaray (A1) line)
- Cebeci
- Demirlibahçe
- Saimekadın
- Mamak
- Bağderesi
- Üreğil
- Köstence
- Kayaş

== Future Service ==
In 2019, construction started on a 18 km (11 mi) long extension of the line west from its current terminus at Sincan to Akçaören via Yenikent. Originally planned to end at Kazan Soda, the extension was initially projected to open by 2022. As of April 2025, construction on the line is 90% complete.

- Sincan OSB
- Yenikent Merkez
- Yenikent Sanayi
- Akçaören

== See also ==
- Transport in Turkey
- Turkish State Railways
