= Köstence railway station =

KÖSTENCE
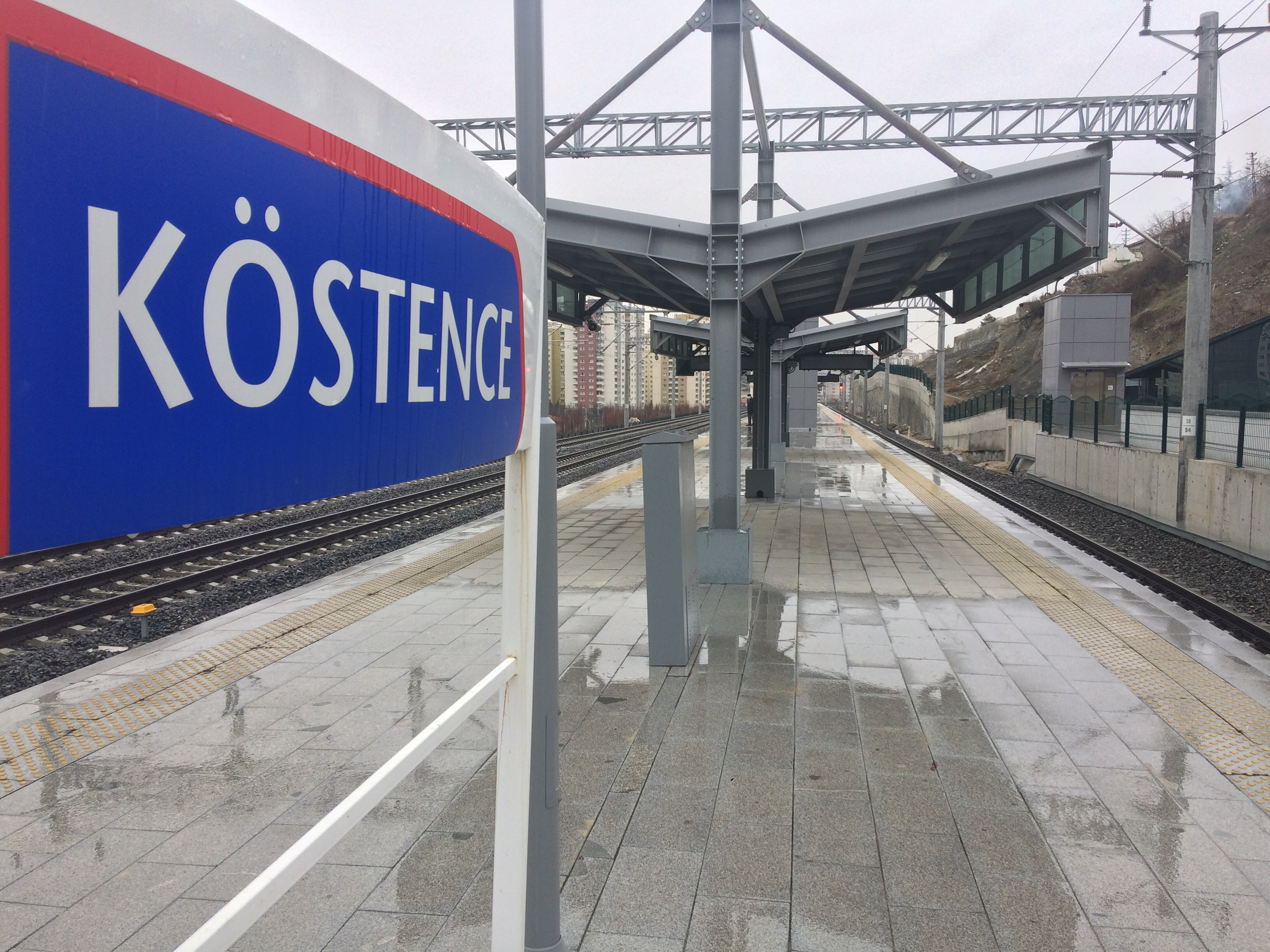

General information
- Location: Kayaş Cd., Köstence Mah. 06270; Mamak, Ankara; Turkey
- Coordinates: 39.9169°N 32.9517°E
- System: TCDD Taşımacılık commuter rail station
- Owner: Turkish State Railways
- Operator: TCDD Taşımacılık
- Line: Başkentray
- Platforms: 1 island platform
- Tracks: 4

Construction
- Parking: No
- Cycle facilities: No
- Accessible: Yes

History
- Opened: 1972; 54 years ago
- Closed: 2016–2018; 8 years ago
- Rebuilt: 2017–2018; 8 years ago

Services
| Preceding station | TCDD Taşımacılık | Following station |
|---|---|---|
| Topkaya towards Sincan | Başkentray | Kayaş Terminus |
Track layout
Location

Köstence railway station (Turkish: Köstence istasyonu) is a railway station in Ankara, Turkey, on the Başkentray commuter rail line. The original station was built in 1970 by the Turkish State Railways and entered service in 1972 as a station on the Ankara suburban. The first station consisted of an island platform with two tracks.

In 2016, the station was closed, demolished and rebuilt to accommodate higher capacity. The new station consists of an island platform serving two tracks, with two more tracks on the south side for intercity and high-speed trains. Köstence was reopened on 12 April 2018.
