= Irmak =

- Gender: Unisex
- Language: Turkish

Origin
- Language: Turkish
- Meaning: "River"

Other names
- See also: Deniz

Irmak is a unisex Turkish given name. In Turkish, "Irmak" means "river".

== People ==
=== Given name ===
- Irmak Yıldırım (born 2005), Turkish female motocross racer

=== Surname ===
- Çağan Irmak (born 1970), Turkish film director
- Çağla Irmak (born 1997), Turkish actress
- Sadi Irmak (1904–1990), Turkish politician
- Şahin Irmak (born 1981), Turkish actor

== Fictional characters ==
- Irmak Bozoğlu, a character of Turkish TV series Alacakaranlık played by Cansu Dere
