= Kayaş railway station =

Railway station in Mamak, Ankara

KAYAŞ
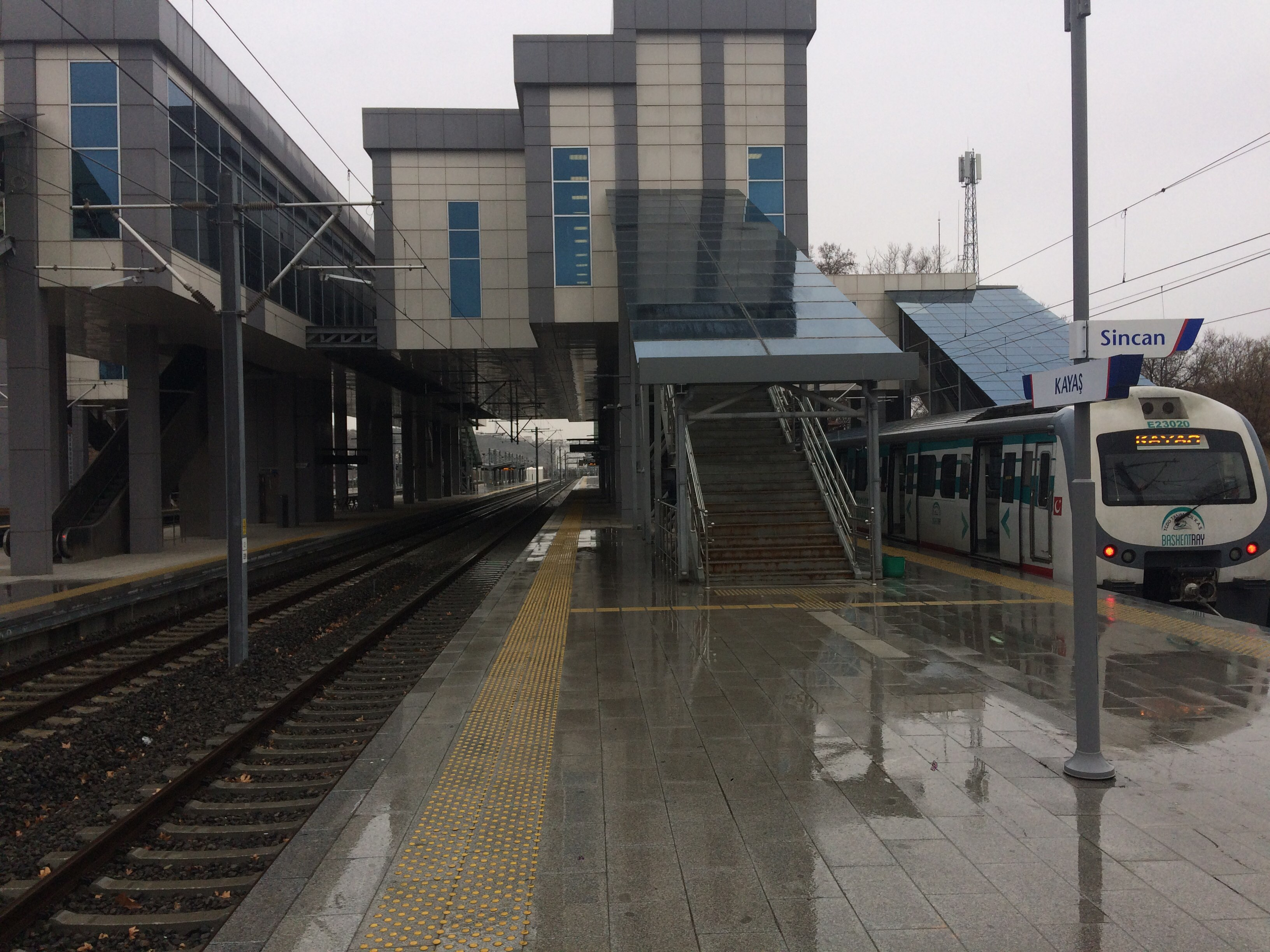

General information
- Location: Atatürk Blv., Hacettepe, 06230; Altındağ/Ankara; Turkey
- Coordinates: 39.9290°N 32.8551°E
- System: TCDD commuter rail station
- Owner: Turkish State Railways
- Operator: TCDD Taşımacılık
- Lines: Ankara-Kars railway Ankara-Sivas high-speed railway
- Platforms: 3 (2 island platforms, 1 side platform)
- Tracks: 7
- Connections: EGO Bus: 352, 354, 354-3, 357, 359, 368, 369, 389, 394, 394-3, 397, 398-3

Construction
- Parking: No
- Cycle facilities: No
- Accessible: Yes
- Architectural style: Turkish Neoclassical

History
- Opened: 1920s
- Closed: 2016–2017; 9 years ago

Services
Preceding station	TCDD Taşımacılık	Following station
Ankara Terminus	Yüksek Hızlı Tren	Elmadağ YHT towards Sivas
Ankara Terminus	Eastern Express	Elmadağ towards Kars
Ankara Terminus	Eastern Express (Tourist)	Irmak towards Kars
Ankara Terminus	4 Sep Express	Elmadağ towards Malatya
Ankara Terminus	Lake Van Express	Elmadağ towards Tatvan
Ankara Terminus	Southern Express	Elmadağ towards Kurtalan
Köstence towards Sincan	Başkentray	Terminus
Location

Kayaş railway station is a railway station on the Başkentray commuter rail line in Ankara, Turkey. Located in the Kayaş neighborhood of the Mamak district, it is the eastern terminus of the line. The station closed down in July 2016 and the platforms were demolished, expanded and rebuilt; Kayaş station reopened on 12 April 2018 and serves commuter, regional and intercity trains. As of 2023, it now also serves as a station on the Ankara–Sivas high-speed railway operated by YHT. The station house was built in the Turkish Neoclassical style, during the First national architectural movement in Turkey.

Before 2016, Kayaş station had two island platforms serving four tracks. (Two for commuter trains and two for regional and intercity trains) The station has been expanded to seven tracks with three platforms. Two of the seven tracks will serve as a layover siding for commuter trains.
