= 2018 Turkey rail accident =

There were two major rail accidents in Turkey in 2018:

- The Çorlu train derailment, on 8 July
- The Ankara train collision, on 13 December
