= 2018 in rail transport =

This article lists events related to rail transport that occurred in 2018.

== Events ==
=== January ===
- (South Africa) January 4 – Hennenman–Kroonstad train crash.
- (United States) January 13 – Opening of Phase 1 (South Florida) portion of Brightline higher-speed rail in Florida.
- (United States) January 19 – The first train of Bay Area Rapid Transit's Fleet of the Future enters revenue service.
- January 25 – Pioltello train derailment: At least three people are killed and over 100 injured in a train derailment near Milan, Italy.
- January 31
  - (United States) – 2018 Crozet, Virginia train crash.
  - (Spain) (United Kingdom) – The first Class 331 EMU for Arriva Rail North in England is unveiled at the CAF factory in Zaragoza.

=== February ===
- (United States) February 4 – An Amtrak passenger train collides with a freight train at Cayce, South Carolina and is derailed; two people are killed.
- February 22 – China Railway Corporation records 12.2 million passenger trips taken on the company's trains today, setting a new record for services following the Spring Festival holiday. Known as 'Chunyun,' the travel rush around the holiday is the busiest time for rail travel on the network every year.

=== March ===
- March 9 – Official reopening of rail link between Uzbekistan and Tajikistan.
- (United States) March 13 – Citing infrastructure age and maintenance, Broadmoor, the operator of the Manitou and Pike's Peak Railway, announces that the railway would remain closed for 2018; it is subsequently expected to reopen in 2021 after reconstruction.
- March 16
  - (United States) – Opening of the Lynx Blue Line Extension in Charlotte, North Carolina.
  - (Japan) – The last run of Odakyu, JR and Tokyo Metro jointly operated Tama Express (total length was 64.3 km).
- (Iran) March 20 – IRIR opens Arak–Kermanshah (267 km).
- (Japan) March 21 – The last run of JR-East 115 Series in Takasaki Area. However, Shinano Railway trainsets are still in service.
- (United States) – Florida-based Kirby Family Farm purchases some railroad cars from the now-defunct Ringling Bros. and Barnum & Bailey Corporation.

=== April ===
- (Japan) April 1 – The Sanko Line connecting Miyoshi and Gotsu in the Chūgoku region is abolished and replaced by a bus service.
- April 4
  - (United Kingdom) (Netherlands) – Introduction of through Eurostar services between London St Pancras International and Amsterdam Centraal.
  - – Rail transport in Cambodia: Reopening of line from Poipet to Sisophon.
- April 10 – Rail transport in Cambodia: Opening of branch to Phnom Penh International Airport.

=== May ===
- (Malaysia) May 1 – Opening of KTM's Skypark Link.
- (United Kingdom) May 9 – Re-opening of London Bridge station which officially concludes the Thameslink Programme, separating the Brighton Main Line from the Southeastern Main Line.
- (United States) May 14 – Burbank Airport–North station opened in Burbank, California, providing additional Metrolink connections to the Hollywood Burbank Airport.
- May 21
  - (United States) – GE announces the sale of its railroad manufacturing division GE Transportation to Wabtec.
  - (Japan) – Last run of Tobu 1800 series.
- (United States) May 26 – Opening of Bay Area Rapid Transit's eBART line.
- (Ukraine) end May – New Beskydy Tunnel opens on Lviv Railways.

=== June ===
- (United States) June 16 – Opening of the Hartford Line, a commuter rail line between New Haven, Connecticut and Springfield, Massachusetts via Hartford, Connecticut.
- (United Kingdom) June 24 – London North Eastern Railway takes over InterCity East Coast franchise from Virgin Trains East Coast.

=== July ===
- (Turkey) July 8 – Çorlu train derailment; 24 killed.
- (Nigeria) July 12 – Abuja Light Rail begins operation.
- (Netherlands) July 21 – Amsterdam Metro Route 52 (Noord/Zuidlijn) begins operation.
- (United States) July 30 – Opening of SunRail Phase 2 South extension to Poinciana, Florida.

=== August ===
- August 1
  - – Palembang Light Rail Transit, the first operational light rail system in Indonesia, opens.
  - (Philippines) – Reopening of the PNR North Main Line since its closure in 1997.
  - (Russia) – Russian Railways publicly adopts local (rather than Moscow) time.
- (Denmark) August 25 – Opening of Aarhus Letbane extension south to Odder.

=== September ===
- (Canada) September 1 – Final service of the Whitehorse Waterfront Trolley heritage streetcar in Whitehorse, Yukon.
- (Netherlands) September 20 – Oss rail accident.
- (China) September 23 – Guangzhou–Shenzhen–Hong Kong Express Rail Link is opened after several construction delays.
- (Israel) September 25 – Tel Aviv–Jerusalem railway opens from Jerusalem–Yitzhak Navon railway station to Ben Gurion Airport railway station using electric double-deck commuter trains with a design speed of 160 km/h.

=== October ===
- (Switzerland) October 7 – Appenzell Railways: Appenzell–St. Gallen–Trogen railway reopens to general passenger traffic following a 6-month replacement of its rack section by the Ruckhalde tunnel; Stadler Tango light rail vehicles introduced on the line.
- (Saudi Arabia) October 11 – Haramain high-speed railway opened.
- (United Kingdom) October 14 – KeolisAmey Wales take over operation of the Wales & Borders franchise from Arriva Trains Wales.
- (India) October 19 – Amritsar train disaster: An Indian Railways train runs into a crowd attending a festival in Amritsar, killing at least 59.
- October 21 – 2018 Yilan train derailment: A Taiwan Railways Administration Puyuma express derails in Yilan County, Taiwan, killing at least 18.
- October 25
  - (United Kingdom) – New section of Sheffield Supertram opened. Tram-train operations started.
  - – Ürümqi Metro opening. The only rapid transit system opened in China this year (both 2017 and 2019 had more metro systems opened across the country). The rapid transit boom reaches autonomous zones in West China.

=== November ===
- (Iran) November – IRIR opens Maragheh–Urmia (183 km).
- (United States) November 2 – Opening of The Hop (Milwaukee Streetcar).
- (Italy) November 7 – Mercitalia starts first high-speed freight operations ever (maximum speed 300 km/h, average speed 180 km/h).
- (United States) November 9 – Opening of the El Paso Streetcar.
- (Japan) November 11 – The last run of Tokyo Metro 6000 series.
- (Morocco) November 15 – Opening of Kenitra–Tangier high-speed rail line.
- (United States) November 16
  - Opening of the Delmar Loop Trolley in St. Louis and University City, Missouri.
  - Brightline announced it would be rebranding as Virgin Trains USA, with the Virgin Group taking a minority shareholding.
- November 22
  - (Iran) – IRIR opens Qazvin–Rasht (164 km).
  - (Mexico) – The Guadalajara light rail Line 1 is extended north to Auditorio.

=== December ===
- (United Kingdom) December – HS4Air is officially rejected by the UK Government.
- (South Korea) December 1 – Line 9 of the Seoul Metro is extended from Sports Complex to VHS Medical Center.
- (India) December 2 – Bogibeel Bridge opens as the first freight train crosses (officially December 25).
- December 9
  - (Russia) – Introduction of ES-2G Siemens Desiro express trains on Saint Petersburg–Tosno line with speeds up to 140 km/h.
  - (Estonia) – Last run of the Tallinn–Pärnu train.
- (Turkey) December 13 – Ankara train collision: A high-speed train crashes at Marşandiz railway station in Ankara, killing at least nine people and leaving dozens injured.
- (United States) December 14 – Opening of the Oklahoma City Streetcar in Oklahoma City, Oklahoma.
- (Mexico) December 16 – Official start of work on Mayan Train project.
- December 25
  - (North Korea) (South Korea) – Ceremony at Panmun Station to mark "expression of a commitment" to reconnect North and South Korean rail and other transport networks.
  - (China) – Opening of Hangzhou-Huangshan High-Speed Railway and Harbin–Mudanjiang intercity railway.
- (China) December 26 – Opening of Jinan–Qingdao high-speed railway, Qingdao–Yancheng railway, Huaihua–Hengyang railway, Xi'an Metro Line 4, Qingdao Metro Line 13, Chengdu Metro Line 3 north extension and Songjiang Tram Line T2.
- (Australia) December 28 – Pilbara ore railway complete automation. This is the first automated freight train.
- (Azerbaijan) December 29 – The modern express train service between Baku and Ganja was launched.
- (United States) December 31 – TEXRail carries officials and partners for its maiden preview service.

== Deaths ==
- March 4 – Sir William McAlpine, 6th Baronet, British businessman and railway enthusiast (born 1936).
