= 2010 Pretoria train accident =

Railway incident in Pretoria, South Africa

Details
- Date: 21 April 2010
- Location: Pretoria
- Country: South Africa
- Operator: Rovos Rail
- Incident type: Runaway and derailment

Statistics
- Trains: 1
- Passengers: 59 + 3 crew
- Deaths: 3
- Injured: 7
- Damage: R15,000,000

The Pretoria train accident occurred on 21 April 2010 when a train of carriages ran away for 12 miles (19 km) from Centurion Station and derailed at Pretoria. Three people were killed and seven were seriously injured.

== History ==
On 21 April 2010, a luxury tourist train operated by Rovos Rail was at Centurion Station where the electric locomotive was being changed for a Class 25NC 4-8-4 steam locomotive. During the changeover, the carriages ran away out of control for 12 miles (19 km) until they derailed at Pretoria. The accident occurred outside the Blue Train depot. There were 59 passengers and thirty train staff on board the carriages. Three of the train crew were killed, and about R15,000,000 (£1,338,000) of damage was done to the carriages.

== Investigation ==
The South African authorities opened an investigation into the accident. A board of enquiry was set up. Metrorail and the South African Railway Safety Regulator were represented on the board of enquiry. An initial assessment of the cause of the accident was that the uncoupled carriages had insufficient braking power to prevent the runaway. It is reported that the handbrakes on the carriages had not been applied. As the train was not on level track, scotches (wedges) were also required to be placed under the wheels of the carriages.
