= Yarımburgaz train disaster =

1957 railway incident in Turkey

Coordinates: 41.05086°N 28.71515°E

Details
- Date: 20 October 1957; 22:45 EET
- Location: Yarımburgaz, Küçükçekmece, İstanbul; 35 km (22 mi) from Istanbul
- Country: Turkey
- Line: Istanbul––Edirne Main Line
- Operator: Turkish State Railways (TCDD)
- Incident type: Head-on collision
- Cause: Allowing two trains into same occupied block section by signalmen

Statistics
- Trains: 2
- Deaths: 95
- Injured: 150

Location of the train disaster in Istanbul Province

The Yarımburgaz train disaster was a head-on collision of two trains that occurred near Yarımburgaz, Küçükçekmece, west of Istanbul in Turkey on 20 October 1957. With 95 dead and 150 wounded people, it is the worst train accident so far in the country.

== Accident ==
At 22:45 hours local time on 20 October 1957, two passenger trains collided head-on on the single railway line at 35 km (22 mi) west of İstanbul Sirkeci Terminal between the railway stations Yarımburgaz and Ispartakule. The east-bound motor train with the train number 3, composed of three diesel multiple unit (DMU) cars, departed from Edirne railway station at 16:00 hours local time heading for Istanbul. The west-bound train, the Simplon-Orient Express with train number 8, left Istanbul Sirkeci Terminal at 21:50 hours local time heading for Paris, France. It was composed of ten cars consisting of sleeper cars, couchette cars and saloon cars, and was pulled by a 2-8-0 steam locomotive, number 45501 of TCDD 45171 Class.

The signalman at Yarimburgaz railway station, Baki İnözü, cabled the movement of the west-bound train number 8 to the signaller at Ispartakule railway station, Cahit Fırat. As Fırat received the message, he knew immediately that both trains were in the same occupied block section, and a head-on collision would be inevitable, because he had just allowed the east-bound motor train to pass. Both signalmen hastily informed authorized officials around by phone about a possible collision, and requested sending of rescue teams to the railway line position at 34–35 km (21–22 mi).

The collision occurred at 35 km (22 mi) on the railway line from Istanbul Sirkeci Terminal, and almost completely wrecked the motor train. The cars meshed and bent accordion-like, and overturned. The express train suffered damage only in the front part of its first car. The crash was heard by a guard of the munition depot in the nearby 213th Infantry Regiment.

All the deaths and injuries were among the crew and passengers of the motor train. The passengers of the express train sustained relatively less harm. 95 people including five crew members of the motor train were killed and 150 passengers were injured.

== Rescue ==
The operation management at Sirkeci Terminal ordered a rescue train to the accident scene as soon as they received the information about the accident. Fire engines were deployed from nearby Bakırköy Fire Department for fire risk on the spot. The fireman of the steam locomotive prevented a possible fire by removing the ember from the accident scene. The governor of Istanbul Fahrettin Kerim Gökay, Istanbul Chief of Police Hayrettin Nakipoğlu, Bakırköy District Prosecutor and Sirkeci Terminal Operations Deputy Director arrived at the crash scene right after the midnight to administer the rescue efforts. The prosecutor and the commander of the local gendarmerie started with investigation works. Both signalmen were arrested and sent to Bakırköy Court, charged for the main responsible persons of the accident.

Military units from around were ordered to take part in the rescue efforts. The smashed train wreckage had to be cut apart by oxy-fuel welding in order to recover the bodies of the dead and injured. The corpses were lined up beside the railway to enable their identification by the relatives. People with severe and less severe injuries were picked up and transported to the next Halkalı railway station by a train, which was specially sent to the accident scene at 23:30 hours local time. They were then advanced in ambulances to ten different major hospitals within Istanbul. 50 passengers, who received outpatient treatment, were released soon. The day after the accident, the newspapers published the names of the dead and injured. Some of the severely injured people died later in hospital.

Following the completion of the works for wreckage removal, the railway line was re-opened to traffic at 20:00 hours local time the next day.

== Investigation and trial ==
An inspector of the Turkish State Railways (TCDD) prepared an accident investigation expertise for the court, in which the following failures were outlined:

- the steam locomotive of the Simplon-Orient-Express was not equipped with headlights,
- the cars of the motor train were old and wooden. They broke easily during the accident and contributed to the increased death toll, and
- the cars of the express train made an early braking impossible.

On 26 March 1959 the First Criminal Court in Istanbul found the signalmen Cahit Fırat 60% and Baki İnözü 40% of guilty, and sentenced them to three years and two-and-half-years in prison respectively. In addition, they were punished to fines of 2,250 ₺ and 2,000 ₺ respectively. The court ruled further that the TCDD pay compensation to the injured and relatives of the dead.

== Legacy ==
The steam locomotive number 45501, which was involved in the deadliest train accident in Turkey, is exhibited at the outdoor Çamlık Railway Museum in Çamlık village of Selçuk district, İzmir Province.
