= Marşandiz train collision =

Train collision in 2018 in Turkey

- Accident on CCTV

Details
- Date: 13 December 2018; 06:34 local time (03:34 UTC)
- Location: Near Marşandiz railway station, Yenimahalle, Ankara Province
- Coordinates: 39°56′03″N 32°46′42″E
- Country: Turkey
- Line: Istanbul–Ankara railway
- Operator: TCDD Taşımacılık
- Service: High-speed train; Route inspection service
- Incident type: Head-on collision
- Cause: Lack of signalling (Note: The route was opened while signalling works were continuing.)

Statistics
- Trains: 2
- Passengers: 206
- Crew: 7
- Deaths: 9
- Injured: 84
- Damage: Electric locomotive unusable, high-speed trainset at least partly scrap, pedestrian crossing destroyed by high-speed train.

On 13 December 2018, a high-speed passenger train and a locomotive collided near Yenimahalle in Ankara Province, Turkey. Three cars of the passenger train derailed in the collision. Three railroad engineers and five passengers were killed at the scene, and 84 people were injured. Another injured passenger later succumbed to injuries, and 34 passengers, including two in critical condition, were treated in several hospitals.

== Collision ==
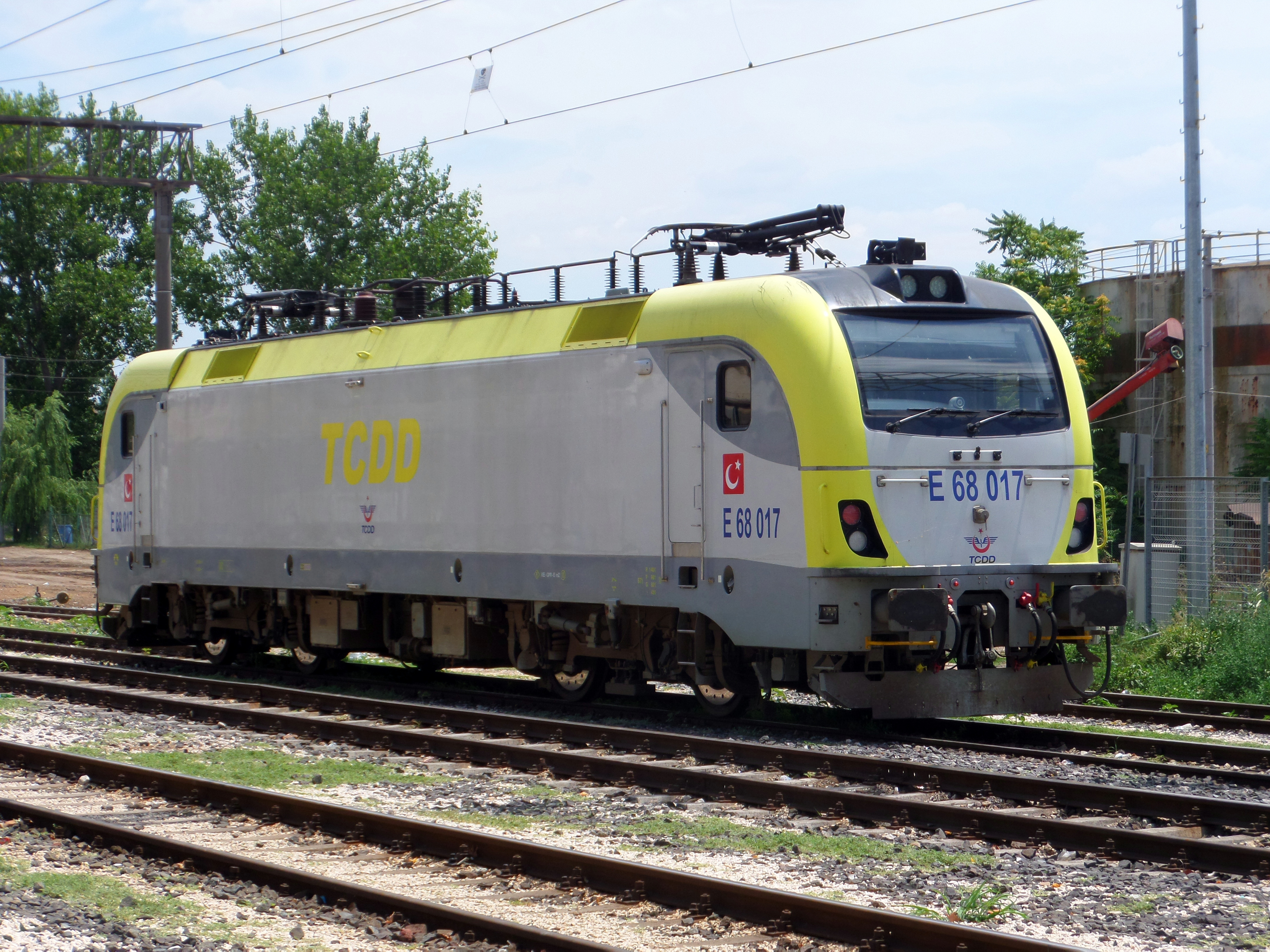
The 68 041, a TCDD E68000-class locomotive (unit 68 017 pictured) was involved in the accident.

The Ankara–Konya high-speed train departed from the Ankara high-speed railway station (Turkish: Ankara YHT Garı) with 206 passengers on board at 06:30 local time (03:30 UTC) on 13 December 2018. About four minutes later, a head-on collision occurred when the train collided with a locomotive returning from rail inspection duty, right before the Marşandiz railway station in the Yenimahalle district of Ankara Province. The high-speed train was traveling towards Konya Station at a line speed of about 80–90 km/h (50–56 mph). Three of its cars derailed, and a footbridge over the railway line collapsed onto two other cars. Eight people, including three railroad engineers, were killed onsite. A German citizen was among the victims. Forty-eight injuries were reported in the immediate aftermath of the incident, though the total was later updated to 84. The injured passengers, three of them in critical condition, were rushed to several hospitals in Ankara. One injured passenger died afterwards.

Photographs show that a E68000 locomotive (unit number 68 041) and a HT80000 (unit number 80101) high-speed electric multiple unit were involved in the accident.

== Aftermath ==
=== Wreckage removal and line recovery ===
More than 40 ambulances, 20 fire trucks, police, National Medical Rescue teams, and fire and rescue teams rushed to the scene of the accident.

Heavy cranes for wreckage removal arrived at the accident site at 16:00 local time (13:00 UTC), and teams of firefighters and railroad workers continued with cutting and removal work into the night despite heavy snowfall. It took three days to remove the wreckage, repair the track, and repair the railway electrification system, after which the line was reopened. Two cars of HT80101 was written off and replacement cars was ordered from Germany and this train reused.

=== Controversy ===
Controversy arose when the chairman of the United Transportation Union claimed that "the railway line ... was opened to high-speed rail traffic before the needed train protection system (Turkish: Tren Denetim Sistemi, TDS) was installed". The Minister of Transport and Infrastructure stated to the press that "such a signalization system is not a sine qua non installation for railway transportation".

=== Investigation and arrests ===
The Chief Prosecutor of Ankara launched an investigation to ascertain the exact cause of the accident, and appointed his assistant and three more prosecutors to the case. A railway inspector, a train dispatcher and a switchman, who were responsible for directing the trains, were detained on suspicion of negligence. Records were obtained for technical analysis as evidence, being the digital records from the trains and the railway station, and radio communication records between the officials on duty. Surveillance camera footage covering the accident became public.

It appeared that the locomotive was on its assigned track. The high-speed train was wrongly directed to the same track, causing the head-on collision.

The prosecutors completed the initial investigation by taking the statements of the three detained railway personnel. The dispatcher stated that he "ordered the switchman to put the high-speed train on track H1 as the locomotive was on track H2". He added that "the switchman did not confirm his action of rail switching. In addition, he instructed the locomotive's engineer to drive slowly". He said that "the engineer of the high-speed train, however, did not report it as running on track H2, because normally he had to know that he had to pass nine railroad switches in order to go over to the track H1 from the track #1". He concluded that "the accident occurred due to lack of communication". The switchman gave the statement that "he received the order, and set then the electric railroad switch by pressing the related button on the board. However, he could not remember whether he had confirmed his switching action. He added that "he did not receive any training in handling of the board, which went in use four days prior to control the electric railroad switch". He accused his superiors as "even though they knew that he was not trained, he was assigned to night shift". The prosecutor sent the accused personnel to the criminal court on duty, which ruled their arrest.

== See also ==
- List of rail accidents in Turkey
- Rail transport in Turkey
- 2018 in Turkey
- 2018 in rail transport
