= Railway Safety Regulator =

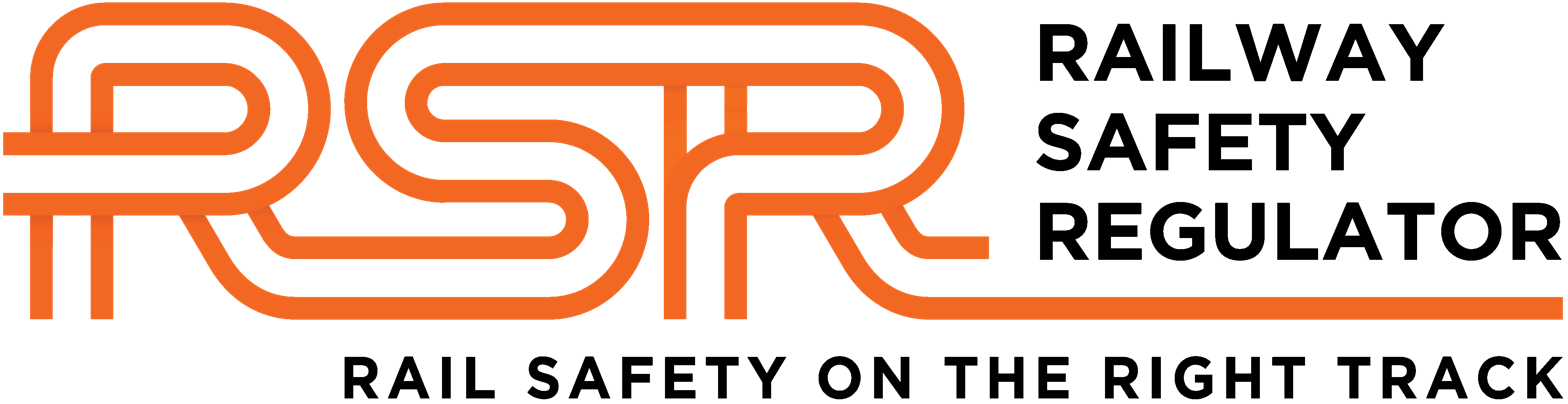
Logo

The Railway Safety Regulator (RSR) is an agency of the government of South Africa, headquartered in Midrand, Gauteng that regulates railway safety.

The agency oversees railway safety, conducts audits and inspections and investigates accidents and incidents related to railways.

The National Railway Safety Regulator Act No. 16 of 2002 established the RSR.

The RSR's oversight role begins before the first train leaves the station. To operate on the South African rail network, train operators must apply to the RSR for a safety permit, demonstrating that they meet prescribed operational requirements.

== Affairs ==
The RSR's Head Office is situated at Building 4, Waterfall Point Office Park in Midrand, near central Johannesburg. Building 2 in the same complex houses the central region office of the RSR. The RSR has other regional offices in Cape Town (Long Street Building) and Durban (Embassy Building).

It previously had its head office in Braamfontein, Johannesburg; then in Waterview Corner in Bruma, Johannesburg Municipality; and later in the Lake Buena Vista Building in Centurion, near Pretoria. It formerly had its Cape Town office in the Paul Sauer Building.

== See also ==
Train accidents in South Africa:

- Blackheath train accident
- Pretoria train accident
- Hennenman–Kroonstad train crash

Other South African accident investigation agencies:

- South African Civil Aviation Authority - investigates aviation accidents
- South African Maritime Safety Authority - investigates maritime accidents
