= List of rail accidents in Turkey =

This list of rail accidents in Turkey provides details of significant railway crashes in Turkey involving railway rolling stocks and with fatalities.

Date	Killed	Injured	Type	Details
1942	16	21	Collision	Two trains collide in Bor, Niğde.
October 7, 1945	40	40	Collision	Two trains collide in Bağıştan, Erzincan.
1948	8	4	Derailment	Passenger train derails in Doğanşehir, Malatya.
1948	12	8	Collision	Two trains collide in Samsun.
October 9, 1948	38	103	Poor maintenance	Train derails in Irmak, Yahşihan, Kırıkkale Province after an axle broke.
1948	1	11	Collision	Two trains collide in Kayaş, Mamak, Ankara after an axle broke.
1952	31	15	Derailment	Passenger train derails in Karaisalı, Bozyazı, Mersin Province.
1952	7	10	Collision	Two trains collide in Torbalı, Izmir.
1953	2	2	Collision	Two trains collide in Esenkent.
October 20, 1957	95	150	Collision	Yarımburgaz train disaster - Two trains collide head-on in Yarımburgaz, Küçükçekmece, Istanbul Province due to allowing the trains into same occupied block section by signalmen.
1958	11	4	Collision	Two trains collide in Çobanlar, Afyonkarahisar.
April 30, 1961	15	70	Collision	Two trains collide in Kartal, Istanbul.
1965	8	4	Collision	Two trains collide in Kadılı.
1965	3	30	Derailment	Passenger train derails in Toprakkale.
1972	4	13	Collision	Two trains collide in Pehlivanköy, Kırklareli.
1972	34	40	Collision	Two trains collide in Gökçekısık, Tepebaşı, Eskişehir Province.
1974	16	35	Collision	Two trains collide in Zeytinli.
1974	15	8	Earthslide	Train hits into earthslide in Palu, Elazığ Province.
1974	6	8	Collision	Two trains collide in Kalın, Yıldızeli, Sivas Province.
1975	5	1	Bridge collapse	Train falls into River Euphrates after bridge collapsed.
1975	7	32	Collision	Two trains collide in Sarıkent, Şefaatli. Yozgat Province.
1975	2	8	Derailment	Train derails in Biçer.
1977	5	7	Collision	Two trains collide in Bilecik.
1977	2	2	Collision	Two trains collide in Ulugüney, Alanya, Antalya Province.
1977	2	10	Collision	Two trains collide in Ankara.
1978	1	12	Collision	Two trains collide in Polatlı, Ankara.
1978	1	6	Collision	Two trains collide in Lalabel, Elmadağ, Ankara Province.
January 5, 1979	16	119	Collision	Two express trains collide in Esenkent, Ankara Province.
January 9, 1979	33	81	Collision	Two commuter trains collide in Behiçbey, Ankara Province.
1980	12	24	Level crossing misuse	Collision at level crossing in Afyonkarahisar.
1980	4	0	Collision	Run-away cars hit into train in Diyarbakır.
May 3, 1980	17	25	Collision	Two trains collide in İzmit.
1981	5	15	Level crossing misuse	Collision at level crossing in Karakuyu.
1982	3	1	Collision	Two trains collide in Taşlıdere.
1982	1	5	Collision	Two trains collide in Uluova.
1983	1	11	Collision	Train runs away in Bilecik.
1986	2	1	Collision	Passenger train collides with freight train in Porsuk.
1986	2	23	Collision	Passenger train collides with freight train in Hereke, Kocaeli.
1989	4	5	Collision	Passenger train collides with freight train in Pozantı, Adanai.
1990	2	49	Collision	Two trains collide in Polatlı.
1992	5	41	Track fault	Train falls into river from bridge due to dismantled rail track in Muş.
1995	3	30	Collision	Railbus collides with freight cars in Ulukışla, Niğde.
1998	2	18	Derailment	Express train derails in Eskişehir.
2002	1	8	Derailment	Passenger train derails in Temelli.
July 22, 2004	41	80	Derailment	Pamukova train derailment - Higher-speed train derails in a curve near Pamukova, Sakarya due to excessive speed.
August 11, 2004	8	88	Collision	Two passenger trains collide in Tavşancıl, Kocaeli Province.
January 27, 2008	9	30	Derailment	Kütahya train derailment - Express train derails near Kütahya.
August 27, 2009	5	21	Level crossing misuse	Passenger train collides with a heavy equipment machine on level crossing in Bozöyük, Bilecik Province.
January 3, 2010	1	7	Passing signal at danger	Bilecik train collision - Two passenger trains collide when a train passed a signal at danger and ran into the rear of a stationary train in Bilecik.
July 8, 2018	24	318 (42 severely)	Derailment	Çorlu train derailment - Five cars of a six-car passenger train derail and overturn near Çorlu due to railroad damage caused by wash-out of ballast after heavy rainfall.
December 13, 2018	9	47	Head-on collision	Ankara train collision - A high-speed train collides with a pilot near Ankara while two cars of the passenger train derail.
October,10, 2020	2	2	opposite direction crash	2 freight trains coming in opposite direction crash in Ankara, killing 2.
