= Kütahya train derailment =

2008 railway incident in Turkey

- Location of the train accident in Turkey.

Details
- Date: 27 January 2008; 02:00 local time (00:00 UTC)
- Location: Çöğürler, Kütahya
- Coordinates: 39°15′31″N 30°11′37″E
- Line: Kütahya-Afyonkarahisar
- Operator: Turkish State Railways (TCDD)
- Incident type: Derailment
- Cause: rail fracture due to frost

Statistics
- Trains: 1
- Passengers: 436
- Deaths: 9
- Injured: 30
- Damage: 5 cars

The Kütahya train derailment was a fatal railway accident, which occurred in 2008 near Çöğürler village of Kütahya in western Turkey, when an express train derailed, killing 9 and injuring 30 passengers.

== Accident ==
The Pamukkale Express, train number 71322, departed from Haydarpaşa railway station in Istanbul for Denizli with 298 people on board at 17:35 local time (15:35 UTC) on 26 January 2008. At around 02:00 local time on 27 January, five cars of the night express train derailed and overturned about 2.5 km (1.6 mi) after departure from Çöğürler railway station in Kütahya. Of the 436 passengers, together with the people boarded in Kütahya railway station, nine were killed and 30 injured.

== Aftermath ==
Residents from the nearby Ahiler village were the first at the derailment site between Çöğürler and Değirmenözü railway station to help. Firefighters, medics, and rescue teams arrived at the accident site about one and half hours later. The injured people were hospitalized in Kütahya and Afyonkarahisar while other passengers were at first transported to Kütahya by bus. The Turkish Red Crescent and disaster management agencies sent in total 300 blankets and food for the relatives of the passengers, who came to the accident site.

The railway line Kütajya-Afyonkarahisar remained blocked until the wreckage was removed and the railway track was repaired. Passengers of the trains, which use the line, were transported by until the line re-opened for traffic.

After inspecting the accident scene, the Deputy governor of Kütahya Province stated that the cause of the derailment was rail fracture due to frost. The weather temperature in the region was −12 °C (10 °F).

It was noted that another train accident had occurred at the same spot in 1990. It was a non-fatal accident with only injured passengers.

== Accident investigation ==
A commission of experts from the Istanbul Technical University's Civil Engineering and Metallurgical and Materials Engineering faculties prepared a technical report for the cause of the accident. The report, delivered to the Chief prosecutor of Kütahya Province on 24 April 2008, stated that the rails were imported from the Republic of South Africa in 1987 satisfying the conditions prescribed by the TCDD. The fact that the rails at the accident site were broken up to 38 pieces showed that the rail material became brittle under extreme cold. The train derailed due to fractured rails. The report concluded further that the express train did not exceed the prescribed speed limit of 65 km/h (40 mph) at the accident site, and the railroad engineer was so free of any gult.

== See also ==
- List of rail accidents in Turkey
- Rail transport in Turkey
- 2008 in Turkey
- 2008 in rail transport
