= Hennenman–Kroonstad train crash =

2018 rail transit disaster in Free State, South Africa

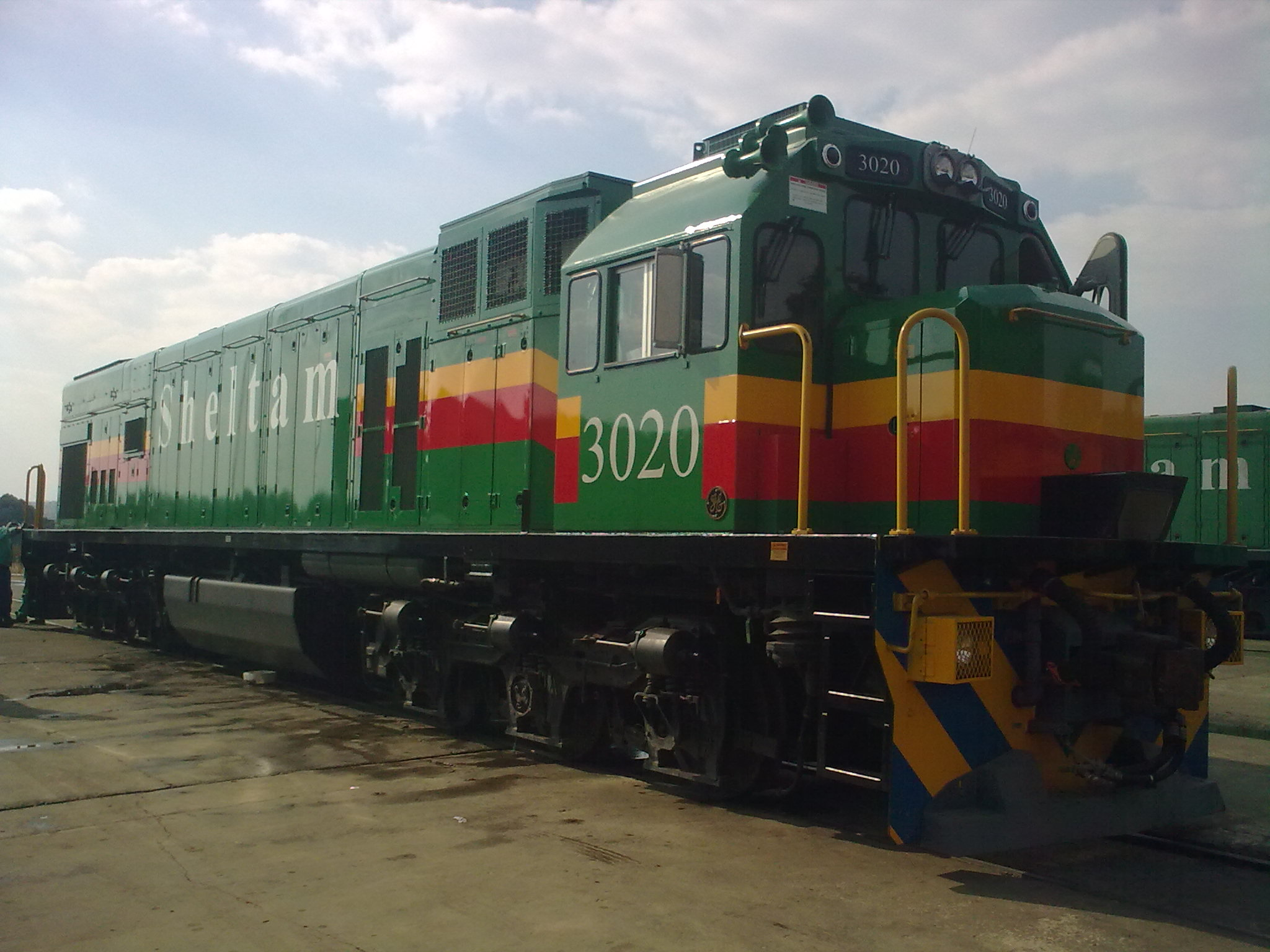
- A Sheltam locomotive similar to that involved in the crash.

- Location of the collision in South Africa

Details
- Date: 4 January 2018; 09:15
- Location: Geneva Station; 20 km (12 mi) SW from Kroonstad, Free State
- Coordinates: 27°49′19″S 27°08′04″E
- Country: South Africa
- Line: Port Elizabeth–Johannesburg
- Operator: Shosholoza Meyl
- Incident type: Level crossing collision
- Cause: Under investigation

Statistics
- Trains: 1
- Passengers: 429
- Deaths: 21
- Injured: 254

On 4 January 2018, a passenger train operated by Shosholoza Meyl collided with a truck at a level crossing at Geneva Station between Hennenman and Kroonstad, in the Free State, South Africa. The train derailed, and seven of the twelve carriages caught fire. Twenty-one people were killed and 254 others were injured.

== Accident ==
At about 09:15 local time (07:15 UTC) on 4 January 2018, a passenger train, operated by Shosholoza Meyl, carrying 429 passengers, was travelling from Port Elizabeth to Johannesburg when it collided with a truck on the Geneva Station level crossing, around 200 kilometres (120 mi) south-west of Johannesburg.

Witnesses stated that the truck failed to stop at the level crossing, despite the train driver giving warning by blowing the horn. The truck, along with its two trailers, was dragged for around 400 metres (1,300 ft), and a car being transported on the train was also crushed by the derailed train.

The locomotive hauling the train was Class C30EMP diesel-electric locomotive No. 3018, owned by Sheltam. The locomotive and 12 carriages of the train were derailed; seven carriages caught fire. Overhead electrical wires had snapped during the collision, causing the fire. The first responders were local farmers and farm workers who rushed to the collision site with fire-fighting equipment and began pulling people out of the burning carriages. Eyewitness and farmer Willie du Preez, said that the fire began ten minutes after the collision, with the first flames behind the locomotive which spread towards the derailed carriages and trapped passengers. 21 people were killed and 254 were injured. At around 20:50 local time, the search and rescue was called off.

The truck driver survived the collision and tried to flee the scene but was arrested and taken to a hospital. Police opened a manslaughter case against the driver. The driver of the truck tested negative for alcohol at a police station.

== Recovery operation ==
Police spokesperson Brigadier Sam Makhele said he believed all human remains had been recovered from the carriages by the afternoon of 5 January, and that forensic workers believed they had recovered the remains of 19 people. Heavy recovery equipment was brought in by PRASA Rail, two days after the collision, to remove the debris from the crash site so that the railway line could be repaired and reopened. On 7 January, the train line was reopened to traffic.

== Speculation ==
Farmer Willie du Preez said that the road to the level crossing follows the railway line before making a 90-degree turn to the crossing. He claimed that there is a blind spot which prevents one, for a moment, from seeing on-coming trains as well as potholes in the road that slow vehicles speeds at the crossing. He stated his belief that the truck's cab and first trailer had crossed and the train struck the second trailer.

As of 6 January 2018, PRASA had not responded to a question from the Volksblad as to whether the train was speeding, as one passenger claimed he had joined the train when it was two hours late, but that the train had regained an hour at the time of the collision.

== Investigation ==
South Africa's Minister of Transport Joe Maswanganyi announced that an investigation would be launched. Maswanganyi also said that "Police are investigating. The truck driver was taking chances... that cost lots of lives." The Railway Safety Regulator (RSR) is responsible for investigating railway accidents in South Africa. The owner of the articulated tipper truck, Cordene Trading, expressed the firm's condolences to the victims and their families through the company's lawyer.

The driver described, when seeing the truck on the crossing, how he tooted the train's horn and applied the brakes with a realisation he and his assistant could do nothing as they were trapped in the cabin. The driver and his female assistant were both badly bruised and suffered neck and head injuries.

In a preliminary finding, the RSR's investigation of the train's speed indicates that it was travelling at 78 km/h when it struck the truck on a 90 km/h track. Only four of the passengers killed in the collision are recognisable but still remain unidentified. Two of the victim's gender cannot be identified at this time while the other victims are four girls, eight men and five women. The other 15 will be identified by means of DNA testing, with the results to be made known by 19 February.

On 26 January 2018, PRASA announced that the DNA testing of the remains were completed and the results would be made known to the relatives of the victims at a gathering at the Virginia Council Chambers, Free State. PRASA would also be providing government assistance for burials.

=== Final report ===
The South African Railway Safety Regulator convened a Board of Inquiry to investigate the collision and released a report in October 2018. The Board concluded that the cause of the crash was the failure of the truck driver to stop as required by the signage. The crash occurred at 08h58 with the train travelling at 78 km/h at the time of the crash, hitting the second and last trailer of the truck with data indicating the train was not braking prior to the collision and dragged the trailer 140 metres.

The truck driver had not stopped as obliged, ignoring the advanced warning signs and a stop sign and was not compromised by poor visibility. On seeing the truck, the train driver had sounded his whistle 400 metres from the impact area but the truck continued to advance across the crossing. The locomotive and ten of 19 coaches derailed. After a few minutes the fires started on five coaches. The fire was caused by the arcing of snapped 3 kV DC electrical cables which failed to switch off or trip after the crash with the heat igniting the exterior and interiors of each coach individually with the fire not spreading to each one. The train crash killed 24 passengers with 240 injuries. There was said to be 547 people on-board and the train's capacity was 640 people.

The locomotive and coaches of the train were deemed to be roadworthy. Poor window and door design compromised escape from the coaches, with the windows too narrow to escape and the doors too heavy to open and no emergency exits. The vinyl seats and exterior of the train were not entirely fire resistant. There were inadequate number of fire extinguishers. The crew had not received safety training for these types of events and passengers received no emergency information prior to travel. The same level crossing was a scene of a train and truck collision on 26 September 2014.

== See also ==
- Rail transport in South Africa
- 2018 in rail transport
- 2018 in South Africa
- List of level crossing crashes
- List of rail accidents (2010–2019)
