= Çorlu train derailment =

2018 train accident in Tekirdağ, Turkey

- Location of the train accident in the Marmara region, Turkey.

Details
- Date: 8 July 2018; 17:15 TRT
- Location: near Sarılar, Çorlu, Tekirdağ; 110 km (68 mi) from Istanbul
- Coordinates: 41.1562°N 27.6889°E
- Country: Turkey
- Line: Uzunköprü-Halkalı railway
- Operator: Turkish State Railways (TCDD)
- Incident type: Derailment

Statistics
- Trains: 1
- Passengers: 362
- Crew: 6
- Deaths: 24
- Injured: 318 total (276 light, 42 severe)
- Damage: 5 cars

The Çorlu train derailment was a fatal railway accident which occurred in 2018 at the Çorlu district of Tekirdağ Province in northwestern Turkey when a train derailed, killing 24 passengers and injuring 318, including 42 severely.

== Accident ==
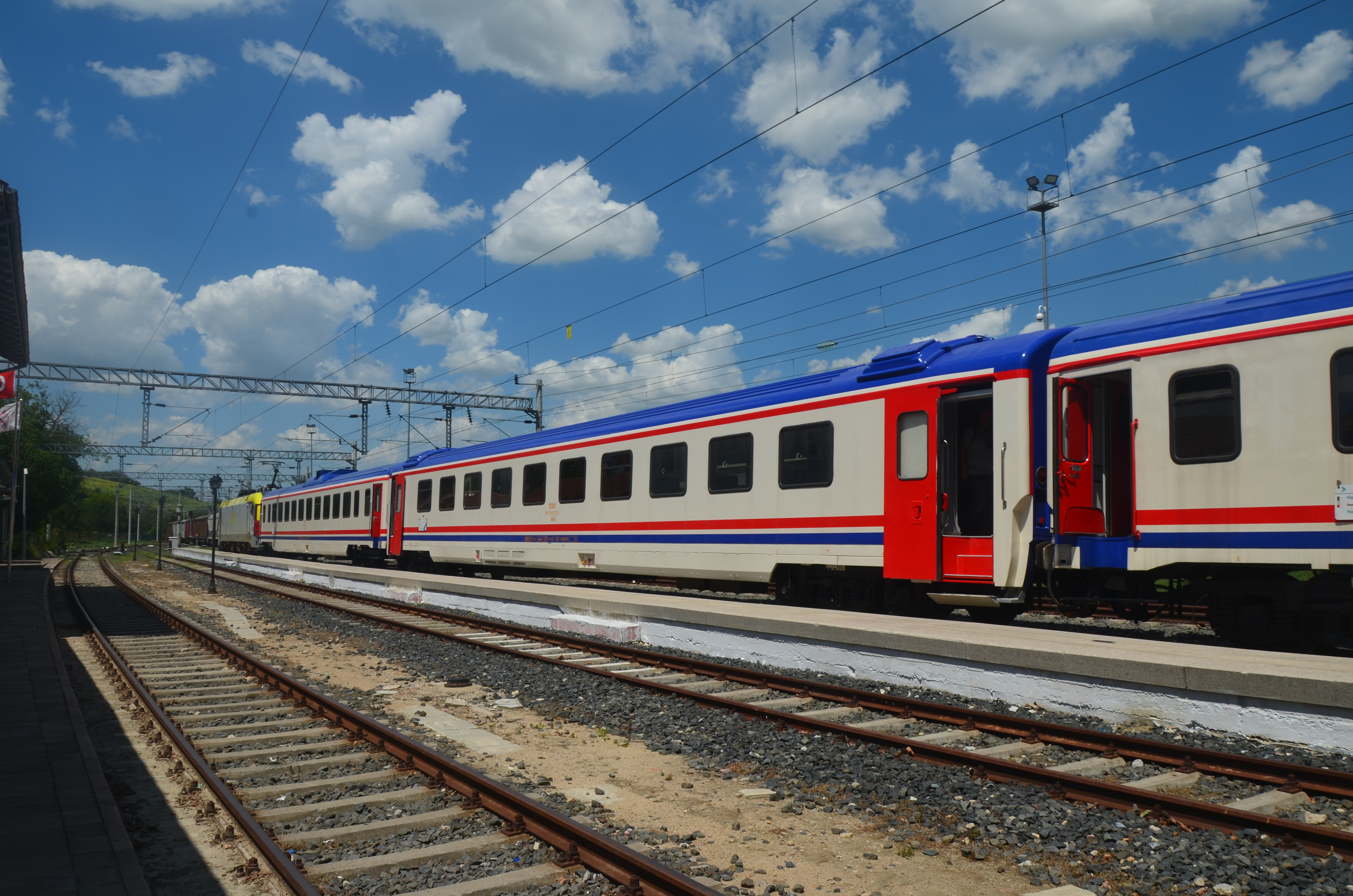
A regional train similar to the train which derailed

At 17:15 Turkish time on 8 July 2018, five bogies of the six-car train of Uzunköprü-Halkalı Regional operating with train number 12703 on the Istanbul-Pythio railway en route to Halkalı Terminal in Istanbul derailed at 162 km (101 mi) near Sarılar village of Çorlu, Tekirdağ. Of the 362 passengers and six crew on board, 24 were killed and 318 injured. 276 lightly injured passengers were discharged from the hospitals after receiving treatment, while medical care for the 42 severely injured victims continues in hospitals in Tekirdağ, Çorlu and Istanbul.

The Turkish Ministry of Transport, Maritime Affairs and Communications announced in a statement right after the accident, that the derailment occurred after the railway track slipped down from its original position due to torrential rains. It was reported that the track was intact when a scheduled train passed through that location at about 10:40 local time the same day. Heavy rainfall at a rate of 32 kg/m^{2} (6.6 lb/sq ft) per hour occurred between 14:20 and 15:10 in the region. Investigations revealed that a culvert under the railway had collapsed as flood water sapped it by washing away the soil underneath its foundation, and as a result the track ballast under the tracks lost its support. However, the sleepers at that spot appeared to be in good order to the railroad engineer of the train, which was running at a speed of 100–110 km/h (62–68 mph). The locomotive ran through without incident, then the first car derailed, although it remained upright. The following five cars, however, fully derailed and overturned, destroying 400 m (1,300 ft) of tracks.

Numerous Russian news sources reported that Russian tourists were among the injured. The Radio and Television Supreme Council imposed a temporary ban on broadcasting the accident.

== Aftermath ==
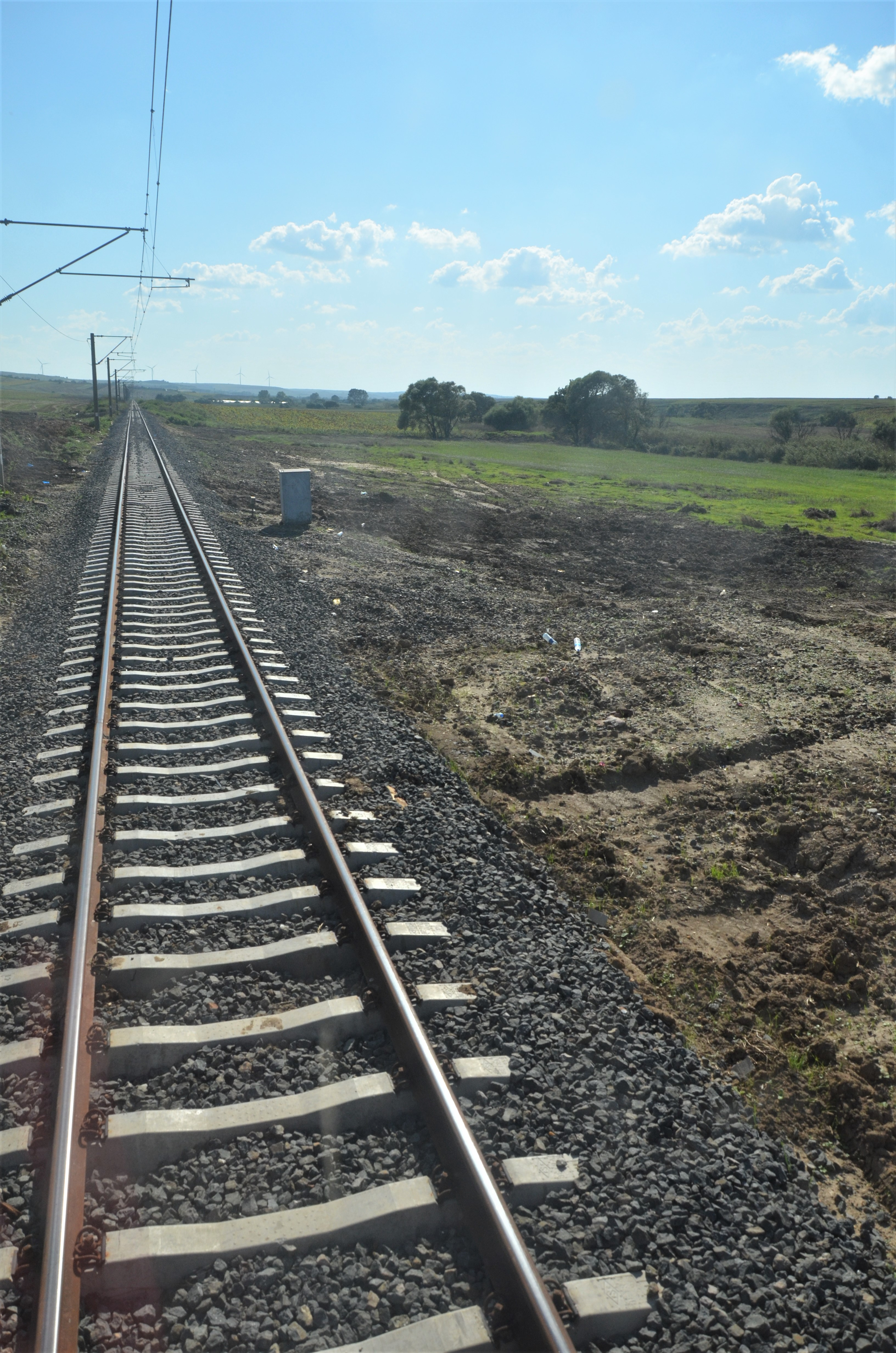
Derailment accident site after recovery works on the right of the rail track Halkalı, Istanbul-Pehlivanköy, Kırklareli

Several emergency services, including AFAD, UMKE, Health Ministry emergency 112 and Gendarmerie, arrived at the scene for rescue operations. The closest distance of the highway to the accident site was approximately 3 km (1.9 mi). Due to the muddy terrain which was a result of the sudden heavy rainfall, access by road vehicles was impossible. The victims were transported to the ambulances waiting on the highway using tractors' chaser bins provided by the villagers. Tracked vehicles had to be sent to the accident site. The injured passengers were transported to nearby hospitals by ambulances and helicopters. Rescue operations continued all night, and were completed at 6:00 hours the next day.

Track repairs began on 9 July. First, the ballast, sleepers, and damaged tracks were renewed from both sides. Following the restoration of the track, the overturned and damaged cars were removed on 14 July by a workforce of 30, with the help of a railroad crane. The cars were transported firstly to Çorlu railway station on a freight train and from there to the Mechanical and Chemical Industry Corporation (MKE) in İzmit by trucks. In February 2021, the mother of a victim was fined to pay TL 8,840 ($1,191 at that time) for insulting public officials while active on social media.

On 25 April 2024, a court in Çorlu sentenced nine railway officials to a combined total more than 108 years’ imprisonment for “causing death and injury by negligence” over the disaster, with individual sentences ranging from eight years and four months for a deputy rail maintenance manager to 17 and a half years to Turkish Railways' regional manager. Four other officials were acquitted.

== See also ==
- List of rail accidents in Turkey
- Rail transport in Turkey
- 2018 in Turkey
- 2018 in rail transport
