= Tokyo Metro 6000 series =

Japanese train type

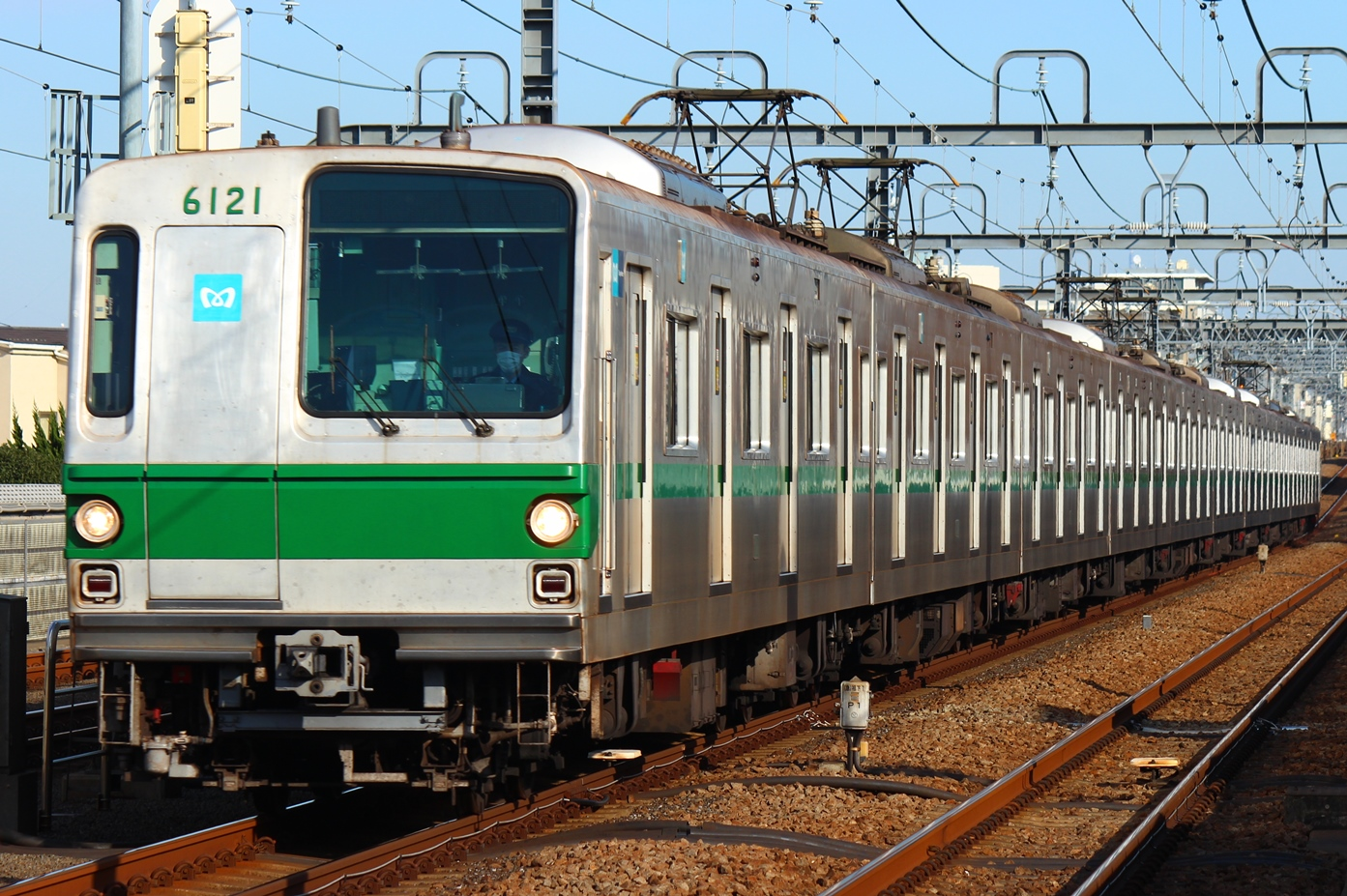
- Set 6121 in December 2014, retired in Indonesia
- In service: 1971–2018 (Tokyo Metro); 2011–present (KAI Commuter)
- Manufacturers: Kawasaki Heavy Industries, Kinki Sharyo, Kisha Seizō, Nippon Sharyo, Tokyu Car Corporation
- Replaced: Tokyo Metro 5000 series (Japan), 103 series, KRL Rheostatik, KRL Holec, KRL ABB Hyundai, KRL-I, and all non-air conditioned EMU (Indonesia)
- Constructed: 1968–1990
- Entered service: 20 March 1971
- Refurbished: 1988–2007
- Scrapped: 2010–2015, 2025–2026
- Number built: 36 sets (353 vehicles)
- Number in service: 1 set (8 vehicles) for KAI Commuter
- Number preserved: 2 sets (4 vehicles)
- Number scrapped: 210 vehicles (8 sets in Japan + 13 sets in Indonesia)
- Successor: Tokyo Metro 16000 series (Japan); CLI-125 series and CLI-225 series (Indonesia)
- Formation: 3/8/10 cars per trainset
- Capacity: 136 (48 seating) (end cars), 144 (54 seating) (intermediate cars)
- Operators: Eidan/TRTA (1971–2004); Tokyo Metro (2004–2018); KAI Commuter (2011–present)
- Depots: Ayase (Tokyo Metro); Bogor, Bukit Duri, Manggarai (KAIC)
- Lines served: All retired: Tokyo Metro: Tokyo Metro Chiyoda Line, Joban Line, Odakyu Odawara Line, Odakyu Tama Line (All stopped 2018), Indonesia: KAI Commuter Loop Line (until 27 May 2022); KAI Commuter: KAI Commuter Cikarang Loop Line, KAI Commuter Tanjung Priok Line, KAI Commuter Tangerang Line (seasonal), KAI Commuter Rangkasbitung Line, KAI Commuter Bogor Line

Specifications
- Car body construction: Aluminium
- Car length: 20,000 mm (65 ft 7 in)
- Width: 2,870 mm (9 ft 5 in)
- Height: 4,135 mm (13 ft 6.8 in)
- Doors: 4 per car
- Maximum speed: Japan: 80 km/h (50 mph) (Chiyoda Line); 90 km/h (56 mph) (Joban Line); 100 km/h (62 mph) (Odawara Line); Indonesia: 70 km/h (43 mph) (on most lines); 80 km/h (50 mph) (Bogor Line); 90 km/h (56 mph) (Cikarang Loop Line; between CKR-JNG only)
- Weight: 22.5–33 t (22.1–32.5 long tons; 24.8–36.4 short tons) (1st-5th batches), 24.8–36.1 t (24.4–35.5 long tons; 27.3–39.8 short tons) (6th batch onwards)
- Traction system: Chopper control, IGBT-VVVF, Hitachi VVVF, Mitsubishi VVVF
- Transmission: Westinghouse-Natal Drive; Gear ratio: 6.53 : 1
- Acceleration: 3.3 km/(h⋅s) (2.1 mph/s)
- Deceleration: 3.7 km/(h⋅s) (2.3 mph/s) (service), 4.7 km/(h⋅s) (2.9 mph/s) (emergency)
- Electric system: 1,500 V DC overhead
- Bogies: FS-378/FS-378A, FS-378B, FS-523
- Braking system: Regenerative braking
- Safety systems: CS-ATC, Odakyu ATS
- Coupling system: Shibata coupler
- Track gauge: 1,067 mm (3 ft 6 in)

The Tokyo Metro 6000 series (東京メトロ6000系, Tōkyō Metoro 6000-kei) was an electric multiple unit (EMU) train type formerly operated by the Tokyo subway operator Tokyo Metro on the Tokyo Metro Chiyoda Line in Tokyo, Japan from 1971 to 2018. A number of trainsets have been exported to Indonesia for use by Kereta Commuter Indonesia following their withdrawal in Japan, and were opperated on the KRL Commuterline.

The trains have 20-metre (66 ft) aluminium 4-door cars, and were used on the Chiyoda Line, as well as Odakyu Odawara Line, and Joban Line (all-stations "local" services). The sole three-car set was used on the Chiyoda Line Kita-Ayase branch line.

== Fleet ==
- 6000: 1st prototype (1968)
- 6101: 2nd prototype (1969)
- 6102–6121: full production 1st–3rd full-production batch type
- 6122–6135: full production 4th–7th full-production batch type

As of 1 April 2018, the remaining fleet still operating in Japan consisted of 2 ten-car sets (sets 02 and 30).

The 6000 series was scheduled for its final commercial operation on 13 October 2018. They were finally retired from service on 11 November 2018, after their final seasonal run. The last trainset retired was Set 30. It was shipped to Jakarta, Indonesia at the end of 2018.

== Formations ==
Trains are formed as follows, with car 1 at the southern end.

=== Set 01 ===
Car no.	1	2	3	4	5	6	7	8	9	10
Designation	CM1	M2	T1	Tc1	M1	M2	Tc2	M2	M1	CM2
Numbering	6101	6201	6701	6601	6301	6401	6501	6801	6901	6001

Cars 1 and 3 each have one lozenge-type pantograph, and cars 5 and 9 each have two.

=== Sets 02–21 ===
Car no.	1	2	3	4	5	6	7	8	9	10
Designation	CT1	M1	M2	Tc1	M1	M2	Tc2	T2	M1	CM2
Numbering	61xx	63xx	64xx	65xx	67xx	68xx	66xx	62xx	69xx	60xx

Cars 2, 5, and 9 each have two lozenge-type pantographs.

=== Sets 22–35 ===
Car no.	1	2	3	4	5	6	7	8	9	10
Designation	CT1	T2	M1	M2	Tc1	Tc2	M1	M2	M1	CT2
Numbering	61xx	62xx	63xx	64xx	65xx	66xx	67xx	68xx	69xx	60xx

Cars 3, 7, and 9 each have two lozenge-type pantographs.

=== Set 24 ===
Car no.	1	2	3	4	5	6	7	8	9	10
Designation	CT1	T2	M1	M2	Tc1	Tc2	M1	M2	M1	CT2
Numbering	6131	6224	6324	6424	6524	6624	6724	6824	6924	6024

Cars 3, 7, and 9 each have two lozenge-type pantographs.

=== Set 60 ===
Car no.	1	2	3
Designation	CT	M1	CM2
Numbering	6000-1	6000-2	6000-3

Cars 1 and 2 each have one lozenge-type pantograph.

== Interior ==
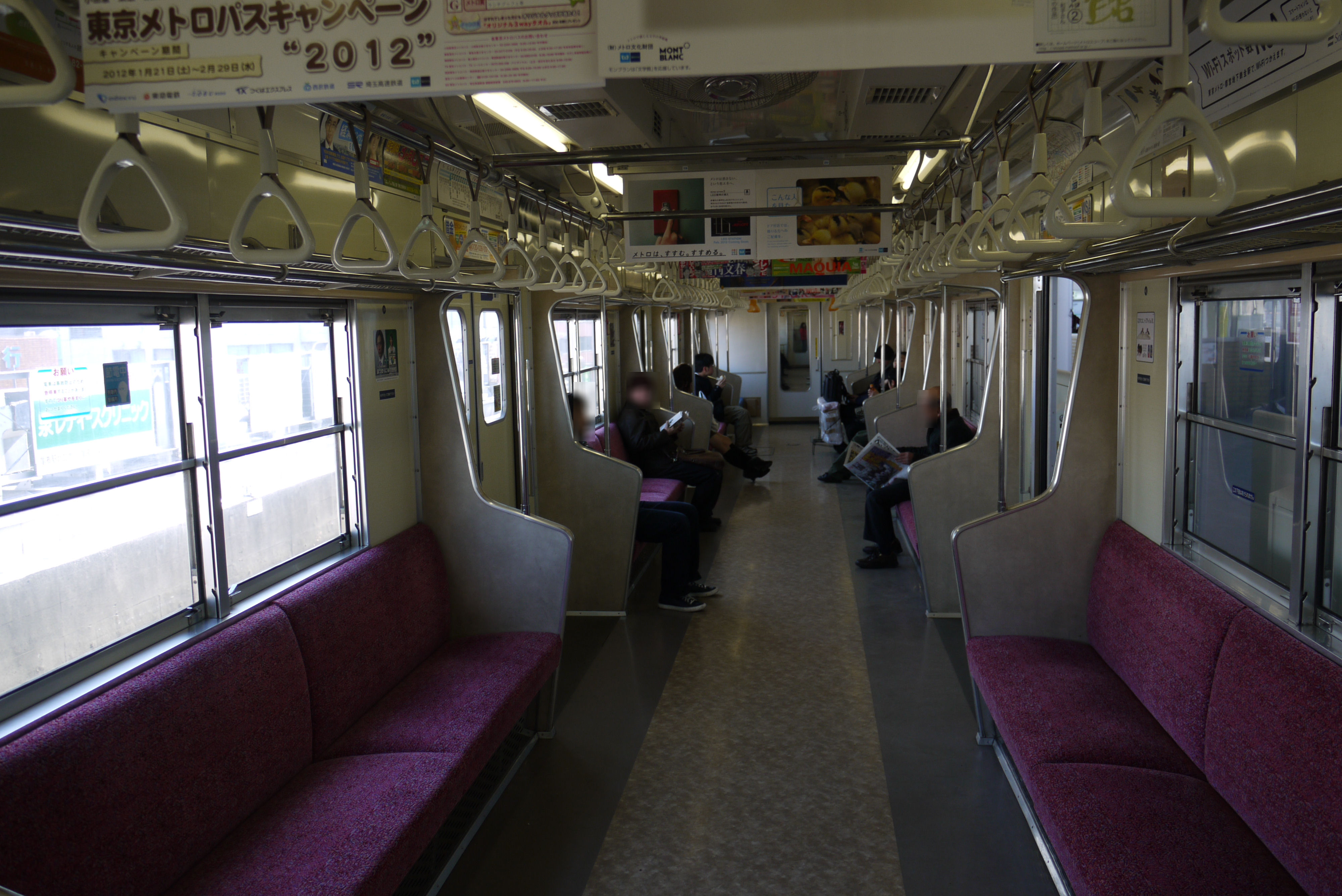
Interior of the three-car prototype

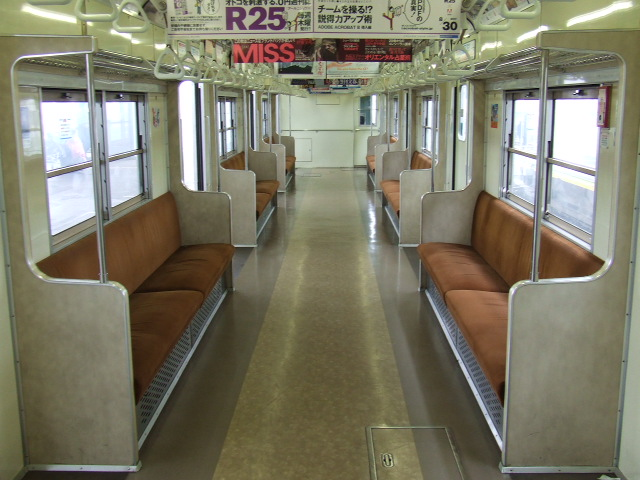
Interior of a typical Tokyo Metro 6000 series train

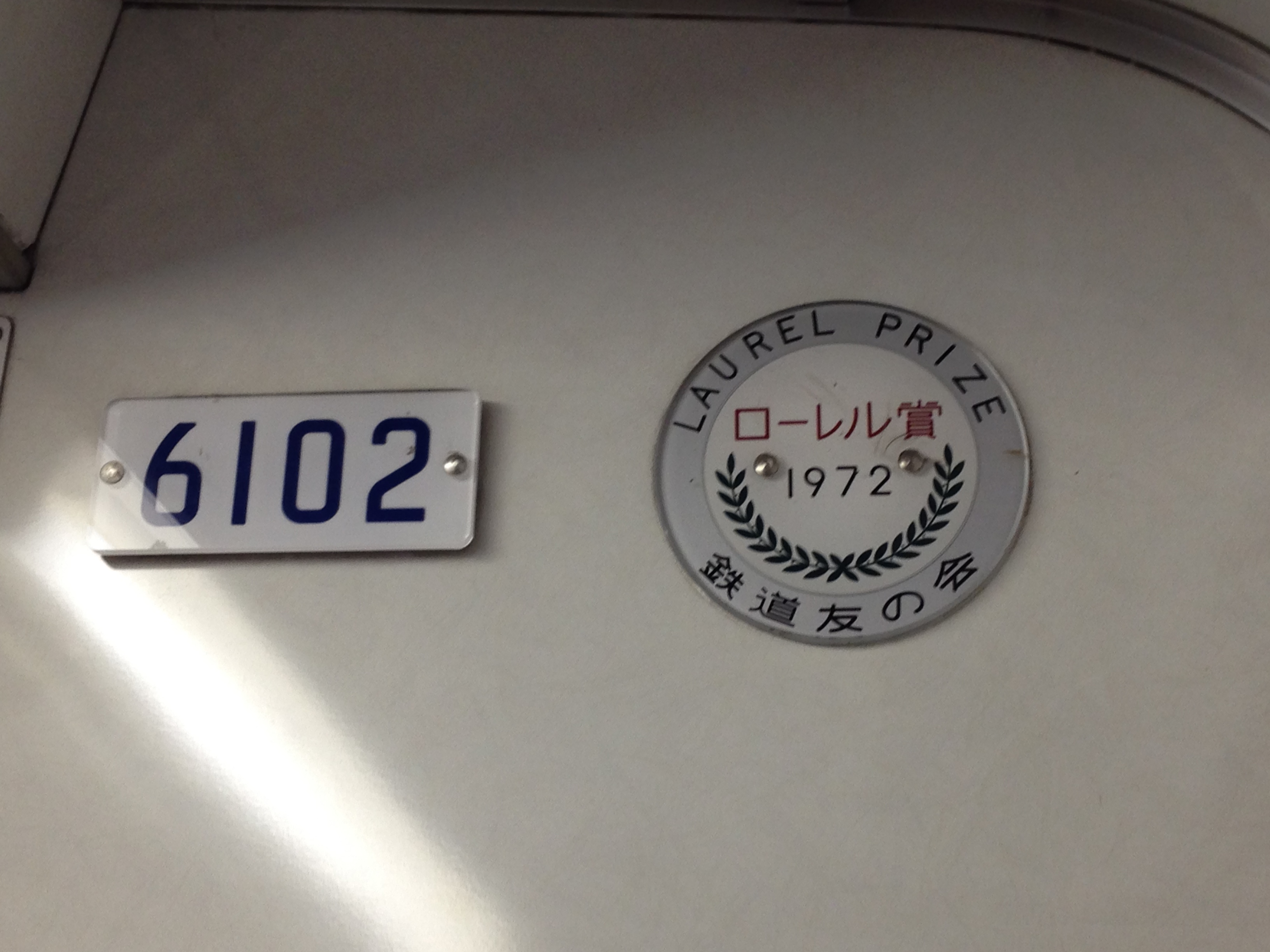
Plaque of the 1972 Laurel Prize awarded to the 6000 series

== History ==
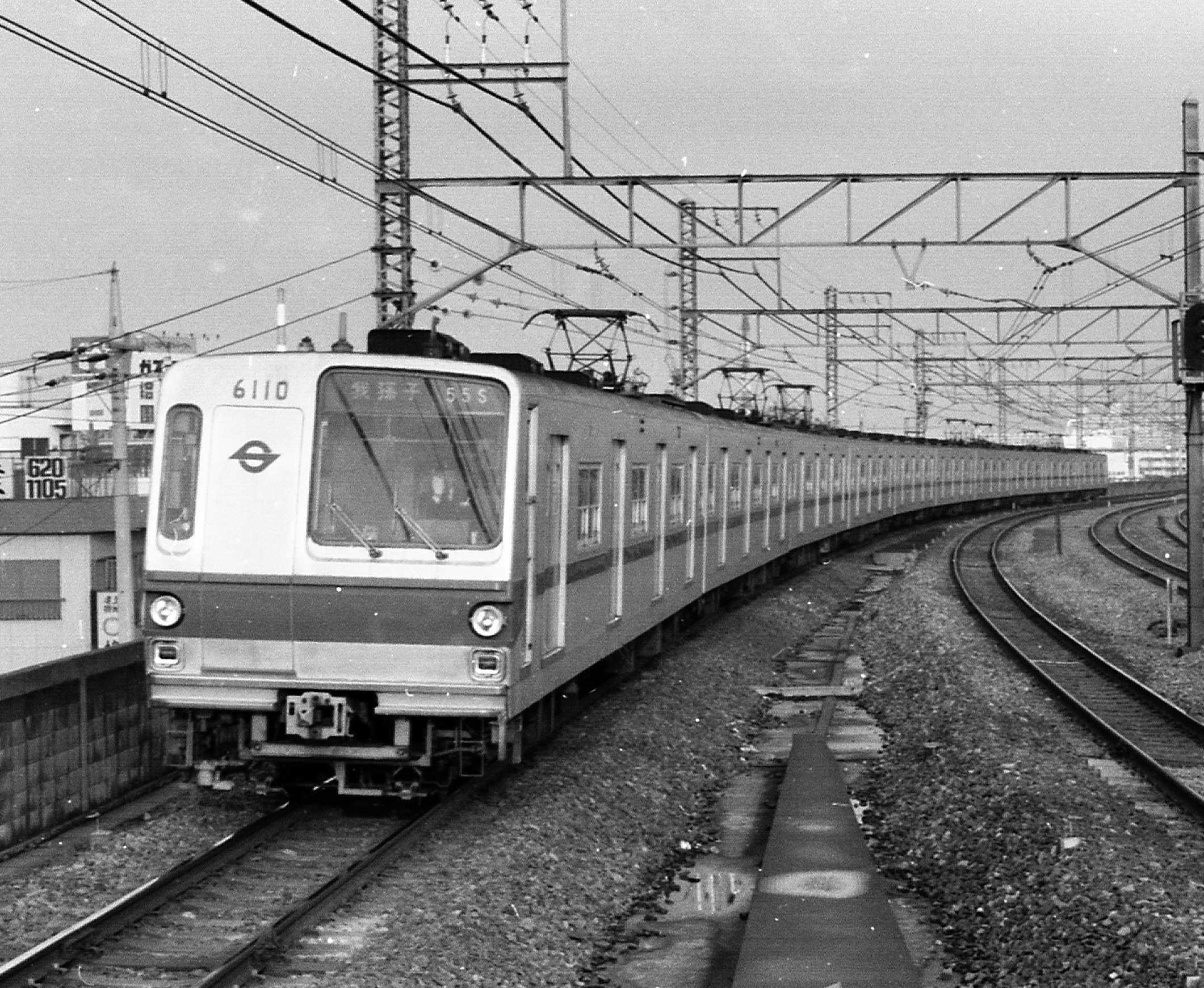
Set 6110 in 1985 before the retro-fitting of air-conditioning

The 6000 series trains entered service in 1971. They won the 1972 Laurel Prize from the Japan Railfan Club.

=== Refurbishment ===
The fleet was retro-fitted with air conditioning between 1988 and 1994. The fleet then underwent a programme of refurbishment between 1988 and 2007.

=== Retirement ===
Following the introduction of the 16000 series, the trains were retired from service.

=== Sale to Indonesia ===
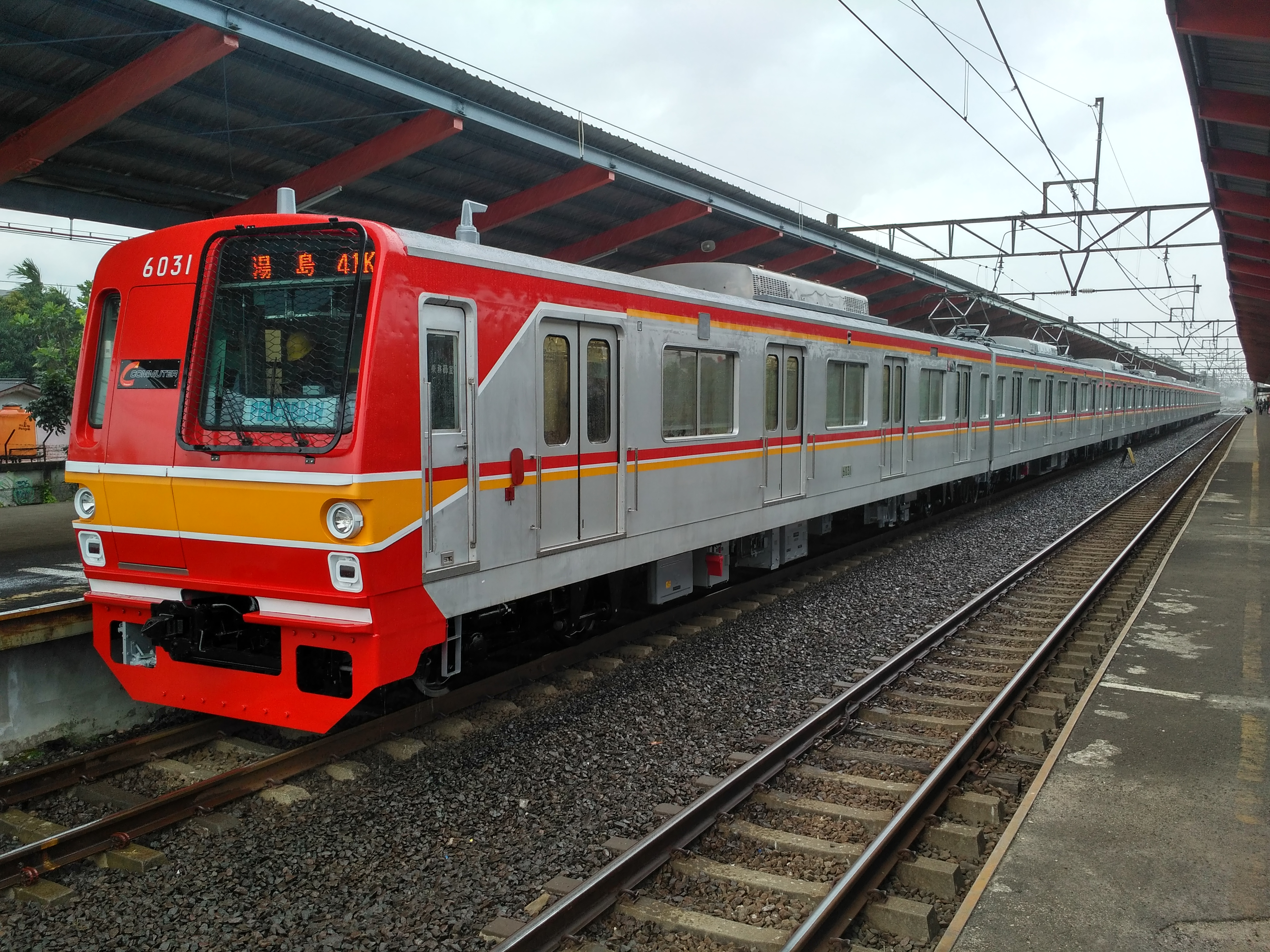
Set 6131 (with larger passenger windows) in Indonesia in December 2016

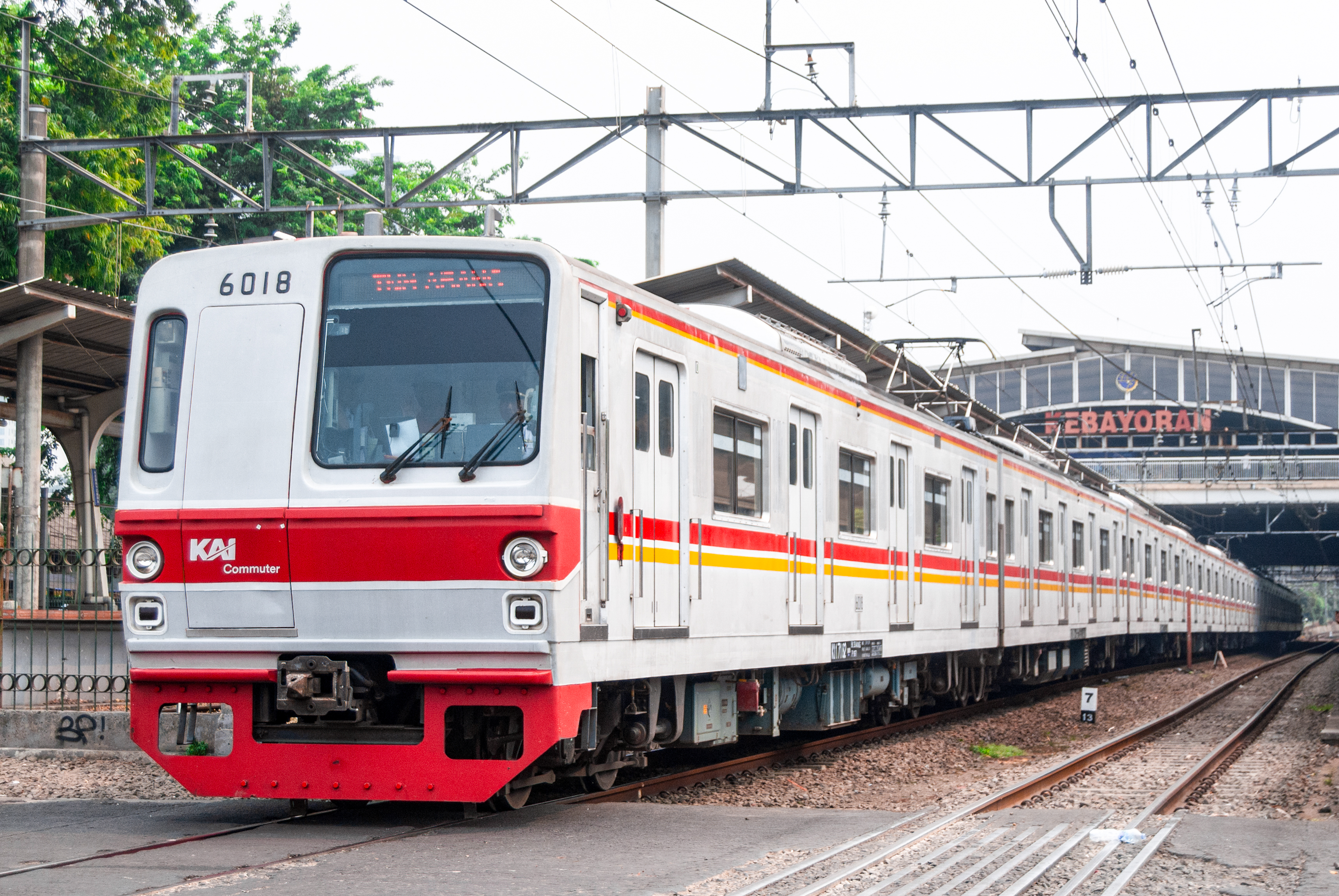
Set 6118 (with smaller passenger windows) operated by Kereta Commuter Indonesia at Kebayoran Station in October 2023

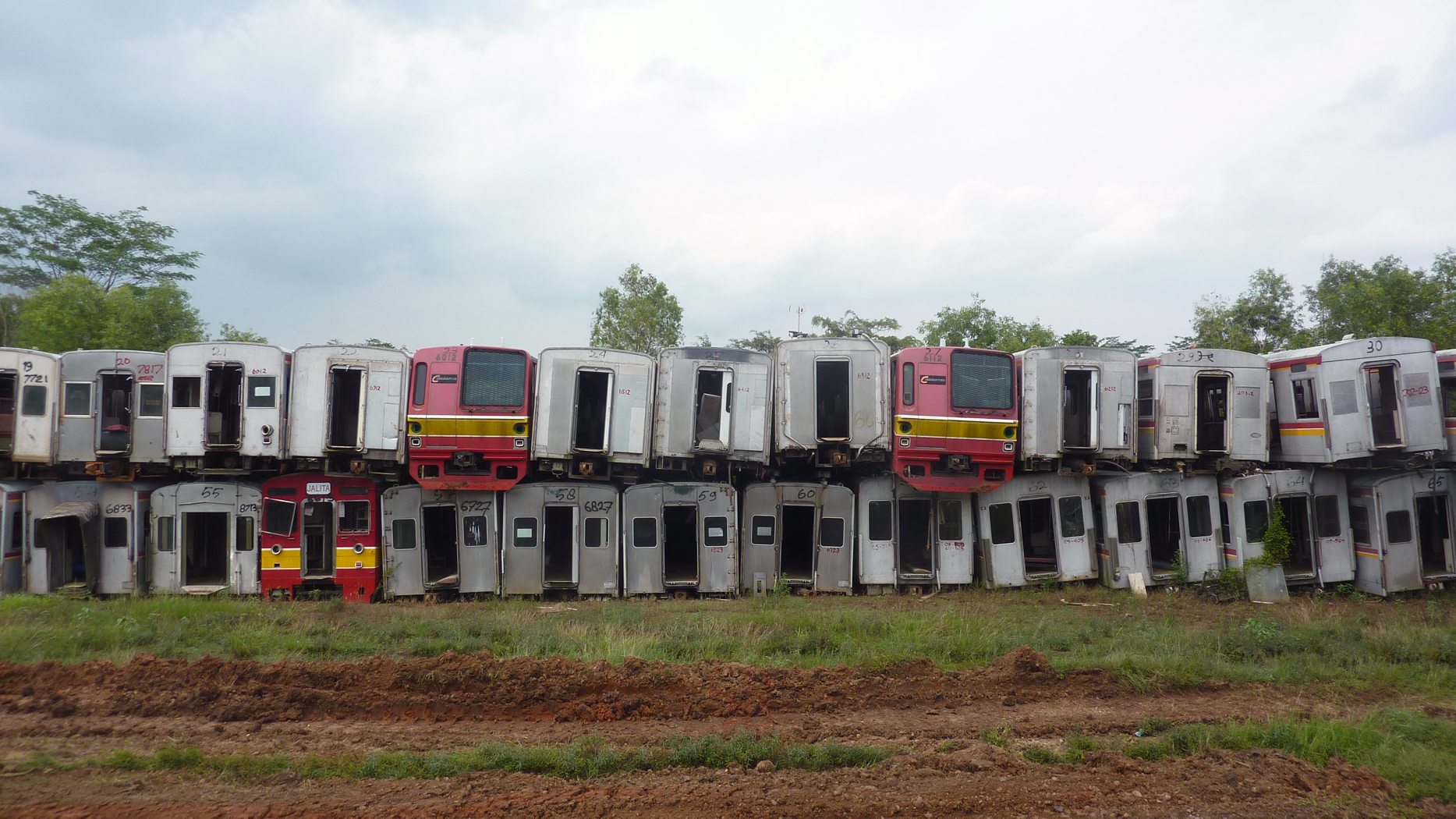
Withdrawn Tokyo Metro 6000 set 6112 in Cikaum

A number of 6000 series sets have been shipped to KAI Commuter in Jakarta, Indonesia, as listed below.

VVVF refurbished sets were shipped to Indonesia from 2016, with the first three sets arriving at the Port of Tanjung Priok in Jakarta on 29 July 2016.

The earlier chopper-controlled sets run as eight-car formations, while the refurbished VVVF-controlled sets operate as ten-car formations. However, some sets are shortened to make it easier for repairs.

Set no.	Date shipped
6101	2016
6105	2012 Unspoor at Depok Depot 2025
6106	September 2011 Unspoor at Depok Depot 2025
6107	2012 Unspoor at Depok Depot 2025
6108	2016
6111	2012 Unspoor at Depok Depot 2025
6112	September 2011
6113	2012
6115	January 2011 Unspoor at Depok Depot 2025
6116	2016
6117	2016
6118	2016
6119	2017
6120	2017
6121	2017
6122	2018
6123	2012
6124	2017 Involved in an accident, unspoor at Depok Depot (cars 6124 & 6024)
6125	2012 Unspoor at Depok Depot 2025
6126	January 2011 Unspoor at Depok Depot 2025
6127	2012 Unspoor at Depok Depot 2025
6129	2017
6130	2018
6131	2016 Unspoor at Depok Depot 2025 (Cars 6231-6031)
6132	2017
6133	2012 Unspoor at Depok Depot 2025
6134	2012 Unspoor at Depok Depot 2025

=== Training set ===
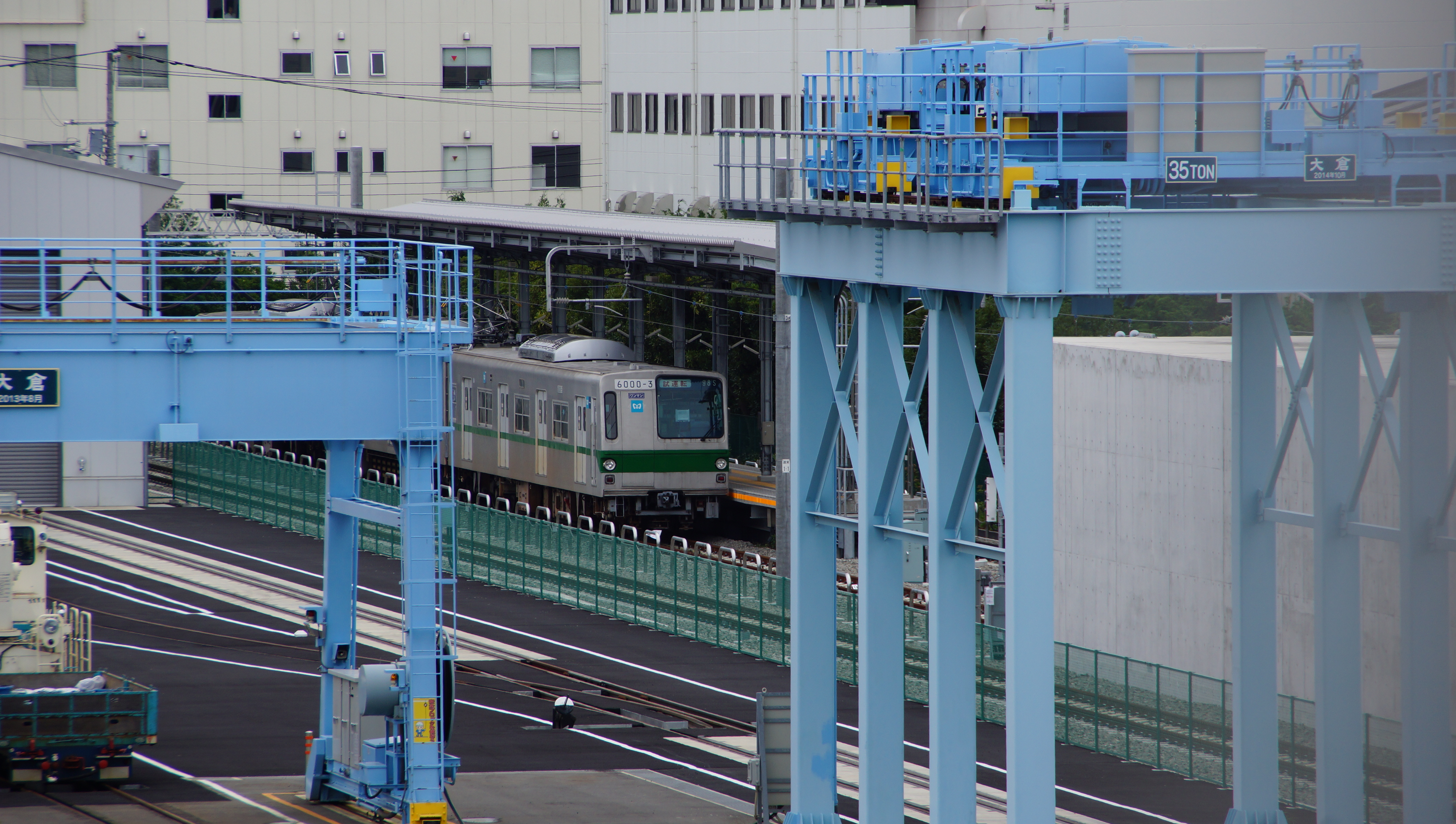
The three-car set 6000 at Shin-Kiba Depot in July 2016

The three-car prototype set 6000, used on the Kita-Ayase branch line until 2014, is used as a staff training unit at Shin-Kiba Depot in Koto, Tokyo.

== Fleet history ==
The individual set histories are as shown below.

Batch	Set no.	Manufacturer	Build date	Refurbishment date	Withdrawal date	Remarks
1st prototype	6000-1	Kisha Seizo	16 April 1968	-		For training purposes only.
2nd prototype	6101	Kawasaki Heavy Industries	27 August 1969 (Note: Cars 6501 to 6801 were built in February 1971.)	28 January 1999	20 May 2016	Shipped to Indonesia in 2016
1st batch	6102	Kawasaki Heavy Industries	5 February 1971	17 July 1996	11 November 2018	Preserved in Kita-Ayase depot. Scrapped in November 2025 (6202-6002)
1st batch	6103	Kawasaki Heavy Industries	5 February 1971	-	26 September 2011	
1st batch	6104	Kawasaki Heavy Industries	5 February 1971	9 August 1995	March 2016	
1st batch	6105	Kawasaki Heavy Industries	12 March 1971	-	10 September 2012	Shipped to Indonesia Scrapped at Depok Depot in 2025.
1st batch	6106	Nippon Sharyo	5 February 1971	6 January 1998	9 September 2011	Shipped to Indonesia Scrapped at Depok Depot in 2026 (6106)
1st batch	6107	Nippon Sharyo	5 February 1971	18 January 1991	30 January 2012	
1st batch	6108	Tokyu Car Corporation	12 March 1971	11 May 1998	21 June 2016	Shipped to Indonesia in 2016
1st batch	6109	Kawasaki Heavy Industries	5 February 1971	April 1988	23 October 2015	
1st batch	6110	Kinki Sharyo	12 March 1971	-	1 October 2010	
1st batch	6111	Nippon Sharyo	5 February 1971	-	13 August 2012	Shipped to Indonesia Scrapped at Depok Depot in 2024.
1st batch	6112	Kisha Seizo	12 March 1971	31 August 1990	8 September 2011	Shipped to Indonesia Scrapped at Cikaum in 2016.
1st batch	6113	Kisha Seizo	12 March 1971	-	20 August 2012	Shipped to Indonesia Scrapped at Cikaum in 2016.
2nd batch	6114	Kawasaki Heavy Industries	22 August 1972	25 November 1996	January 2016	
2nd batch	6115	Kawasaki Heavy Industries	6 September 1972	-	20 January 2011	Shipped to Indonesia in 2011 Scrapped at Depok Depot in 2025.
2nd batch	6116	Kawasaki Heavy Industries	22 August 1972	9 November 1995	15 August 2016	Shipped to Indonesia in 2016
2nd batch	6117	Nippon Sharyo	6 September 1972	18 September 1998	27 June 2016	Shipped to Indonesia in 2016
2nd batch	6118	Tokyu Car Corporation	6 September 1972	13 June 1997	29 August 2016	Shipped to Indonesia in 2016
2nd batch	6119	Kisha Seizo	22 August 1972	24 February 1997	30 January 2017	Shipped to Indonesia in 2017
3rd batch	6120	Kawasaki Heavy Industries	7 October 1977	29 August 1997	29 May 2017	Shipped to Indonesia in 2017
3rd batch	6121	Nippon Sharyo	21 September 1977	July 2000	21 April 2017	Shipped to Indonesia in 2017
4th batch	6122	Kinki Sharyo	10 April 1981	30 March 2007	27 January 2018	Shipped to Indonesia in 2018
4th batch	6123	Nippon Sharyo	10 April 1981	-	2 February 2012	Shipped to Indonesia
4th batch	6124	Kawasaki Heavy Industries	15 May 1981	6 January 2004	10 April 2017	Shipped to Indonesia in 2017. Tc6124 scrapped in Depok Depot in 2026. Involved in a train crash.
4th batch	6125	Kawasaki Heavy Industries	26 June 1981	-	17 February 2012	Shipped to Indonesia Scrapped at Depok Depot in 2024.
4th batch	6126	Nippon Sharyo	31 July 1981	-	11 January 2011	Shipped to Indonesia Scrapped at Depok Depot in 2024.
4th batch	6127	Nippon Sharyo	26 August 1981	-	17 September 2012	Shipped to Indonesia in 2012.
4th batch	6128	Kawasaki Heavy Industries	14 September 1981	17 June 2004	6 December 2015	
5th batch	6129	Nippon Sharyo	24 November 1984	18 October 2006	10 July 2017	Shipped to Indonesia in 2017
5th batch	6130	Kinki Sharyo	12 December 1984	21 November 2005	11 November 2018	Shipped to Indonesia in 2018
5th batch	6131	Tokyu Car Corporation	11 January 1985	16 May 2005	10 October 2016	Shipped to Indonesia in 2016 Scrapped at Depok Depot in 2025 (6231-6031)
5th batch	6132	Kawasaki Heavy Industries	21 February 1985	17 May 2006	27 March 2017	Shipped to Indonesia in 2017
6th batch	6133	Kinki Sharyo	8 October 1988	-	3 September 2012	Shipped to Indonesia.
6th batch	6134	Kinki Sharyo	24 October 1988	-	27 August 2012	Shipped to Indonesia.
7th batch	6135	Tokyu Car Corporation	26 September 1990	-	12 December 2011	

== Related development ==
Both the Tokyo Metro 7000 series and the Tokyo Metro 8000 series were based on the 6000 series for the Yurakucho Line, Fukutoshin Line, and the Hanzomon Line. The cab car was inspired by Bay Area Rapid Transit (BART) in the San Francisco Bay Area, thus created the A-cars as the end cars only.

== Gallery ==
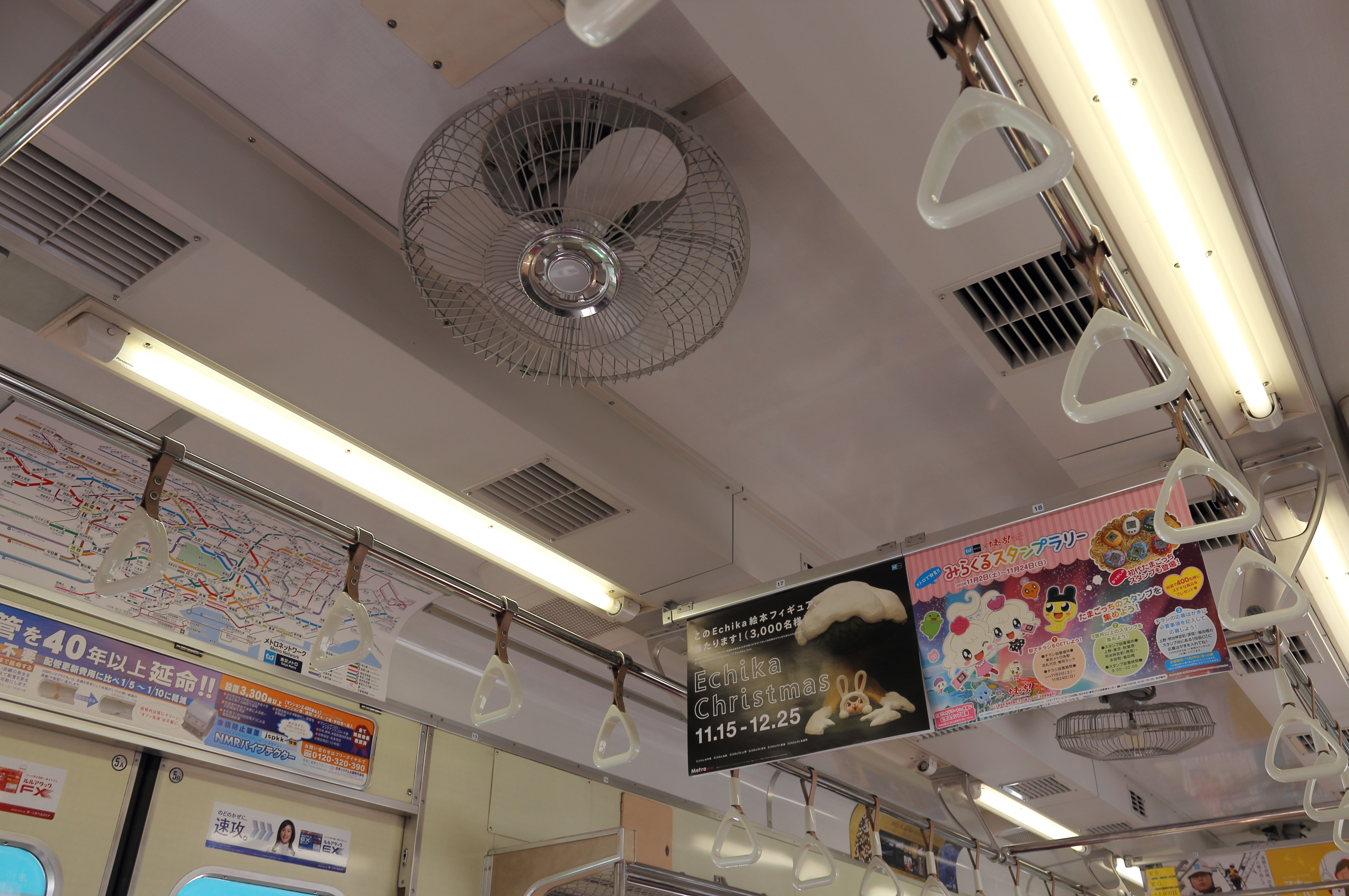
Air-conditioning for the 6000 series; the fan was used for air circulation before the retrofitting of air-conditioning.

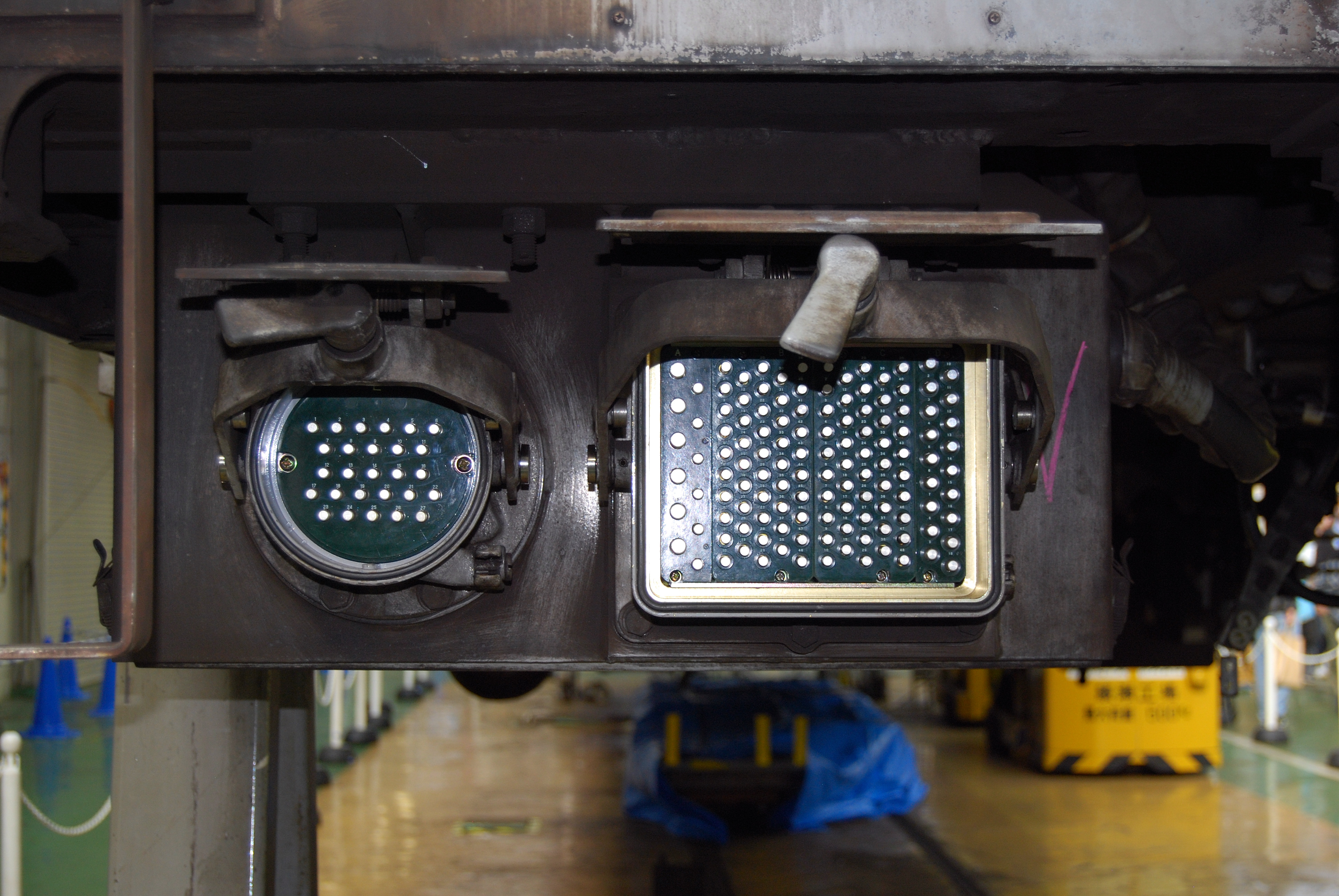
Jumper coupler for the 6000 series

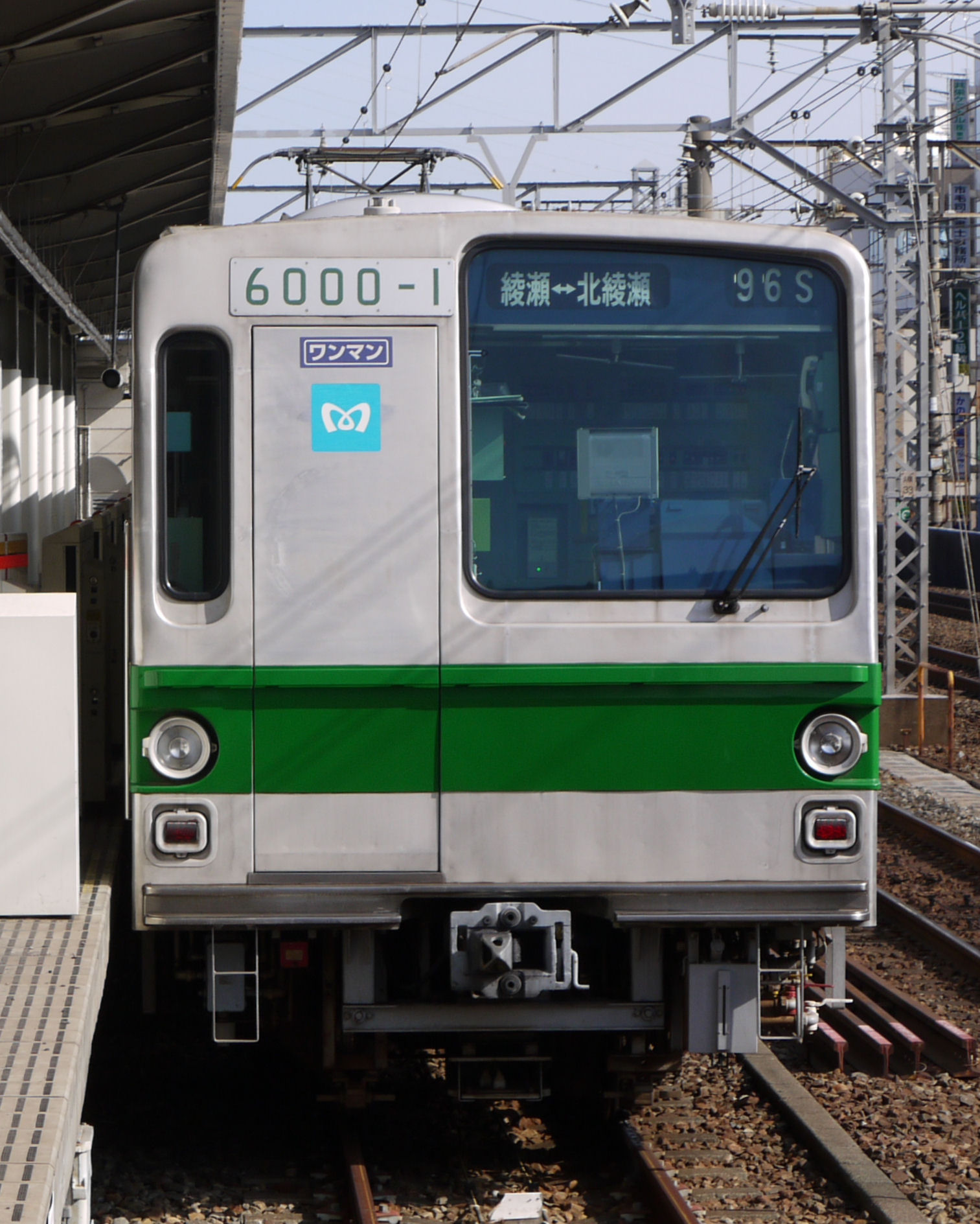
The prototype of the 6000 series, which was used on the Ayase branch

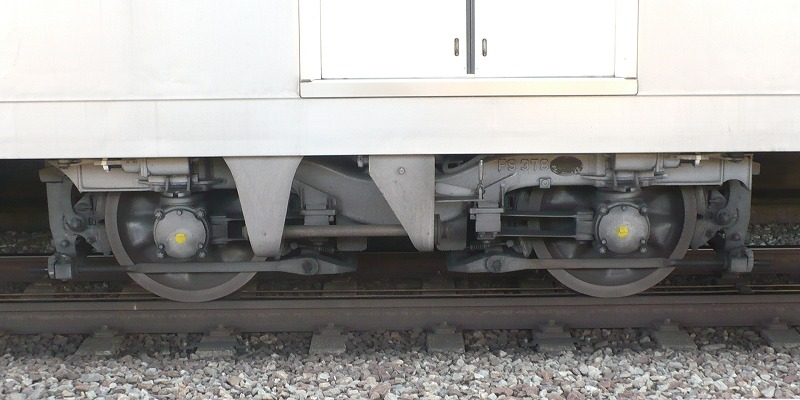
FS378 bogie for the 6000 series

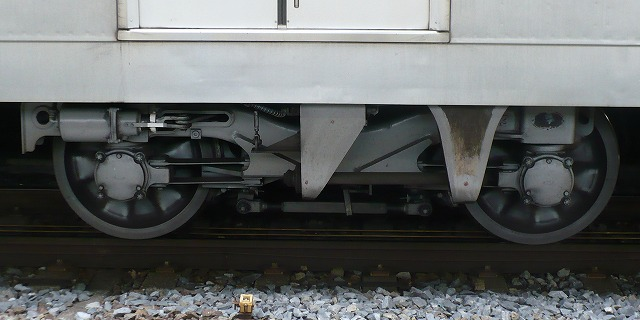
FS523 bogie for the 6000 series

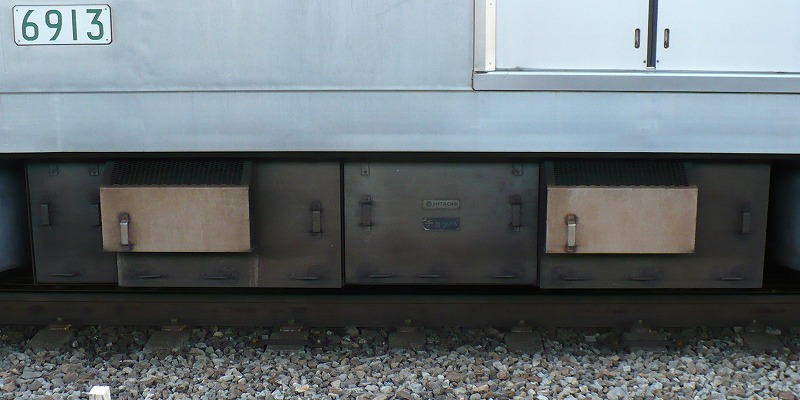
Chopper control as used on the 6000 series

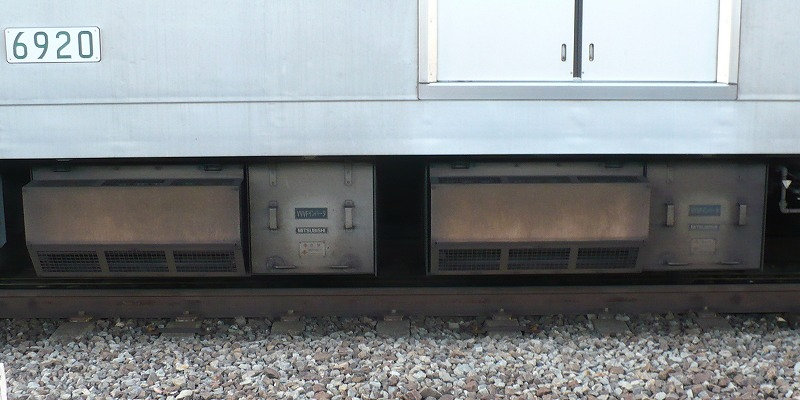
VVVF control as used on the 6000 series

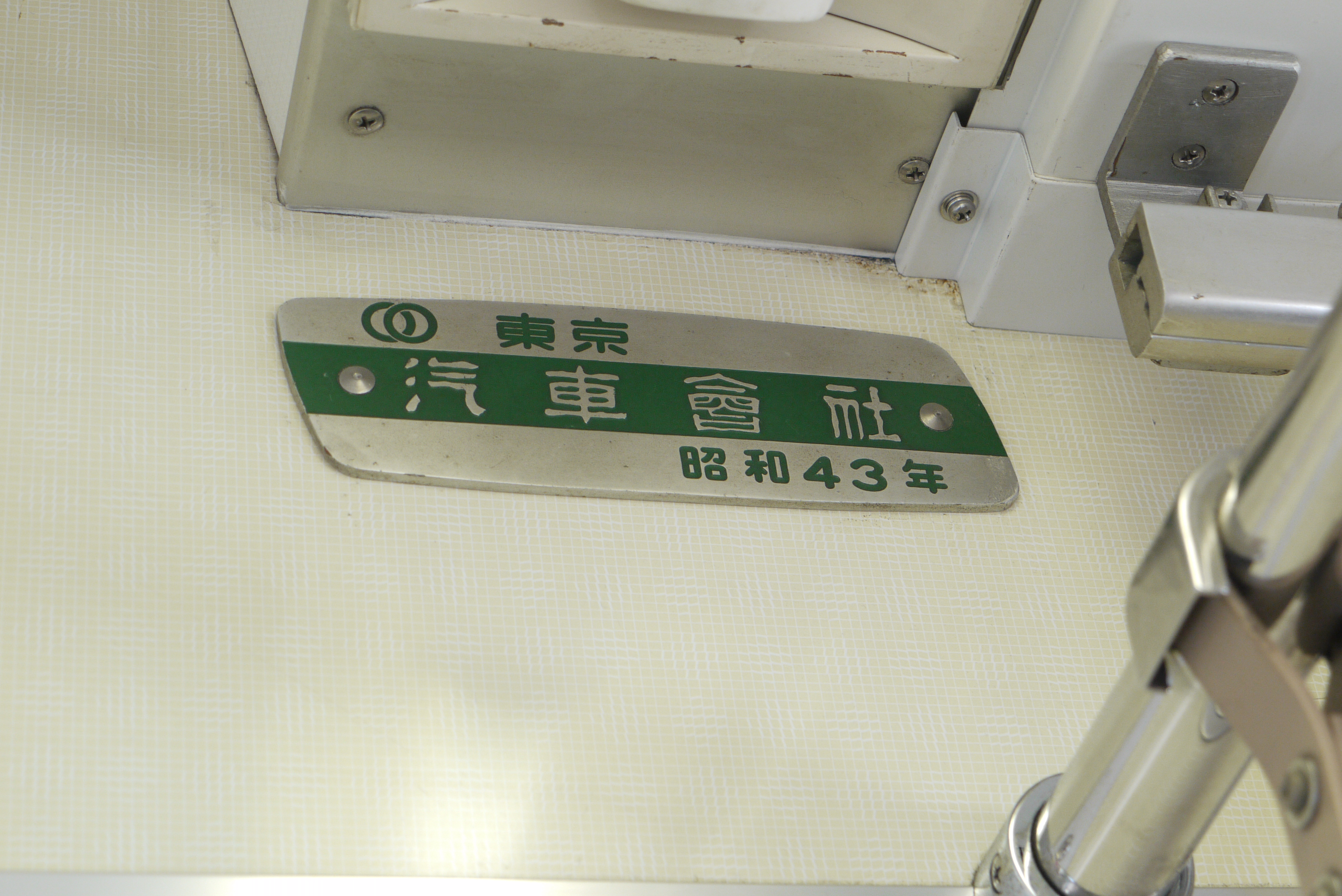
Builder's plate on the 6000 series prototype

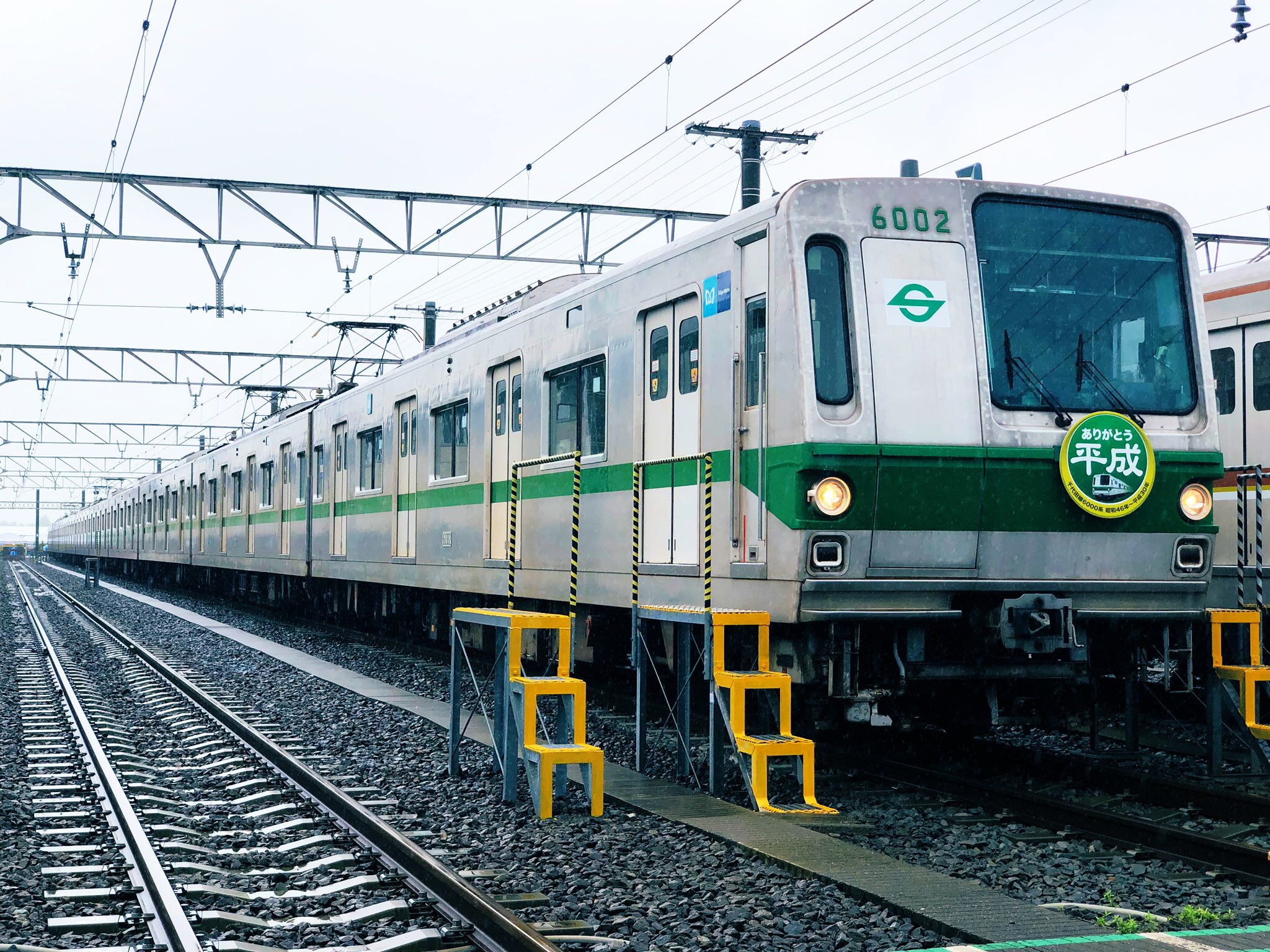
A 6000 series unit bearing the farewell run decals, July 2019

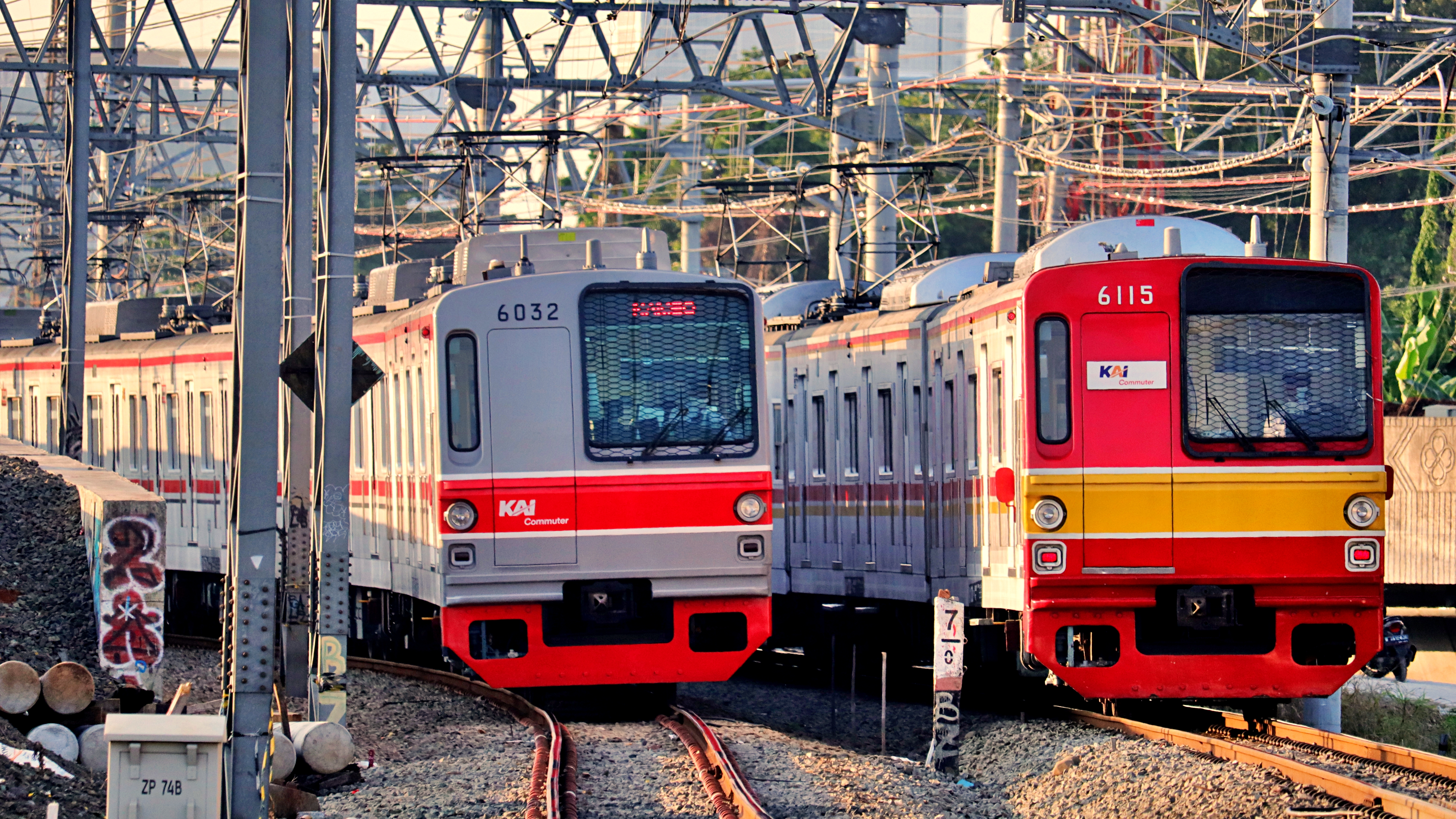
Set 6132 and 6115 in Indonesia, February 2021

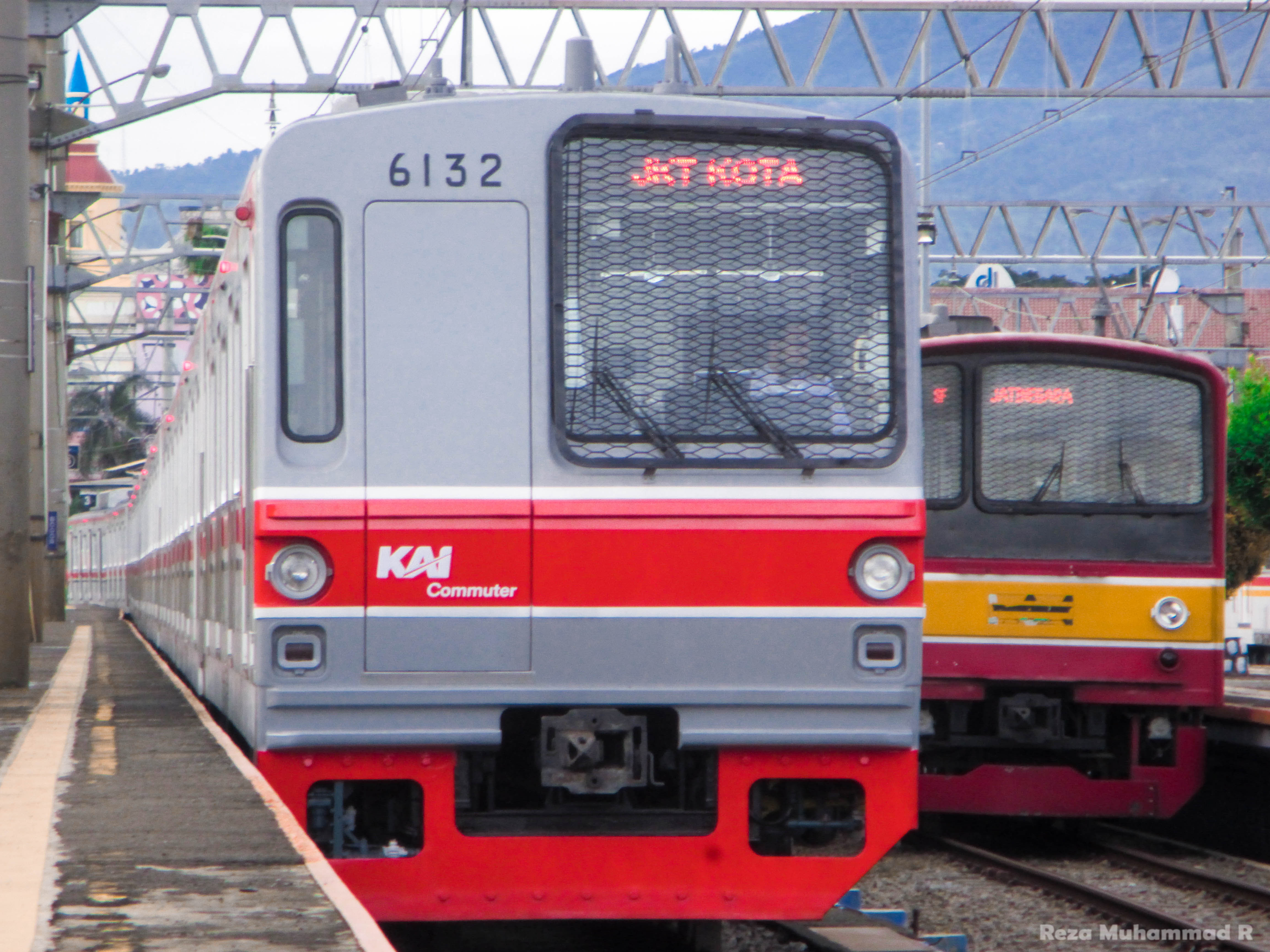
Set 6132 with new KAI Commuter livery scheme, December 2020.

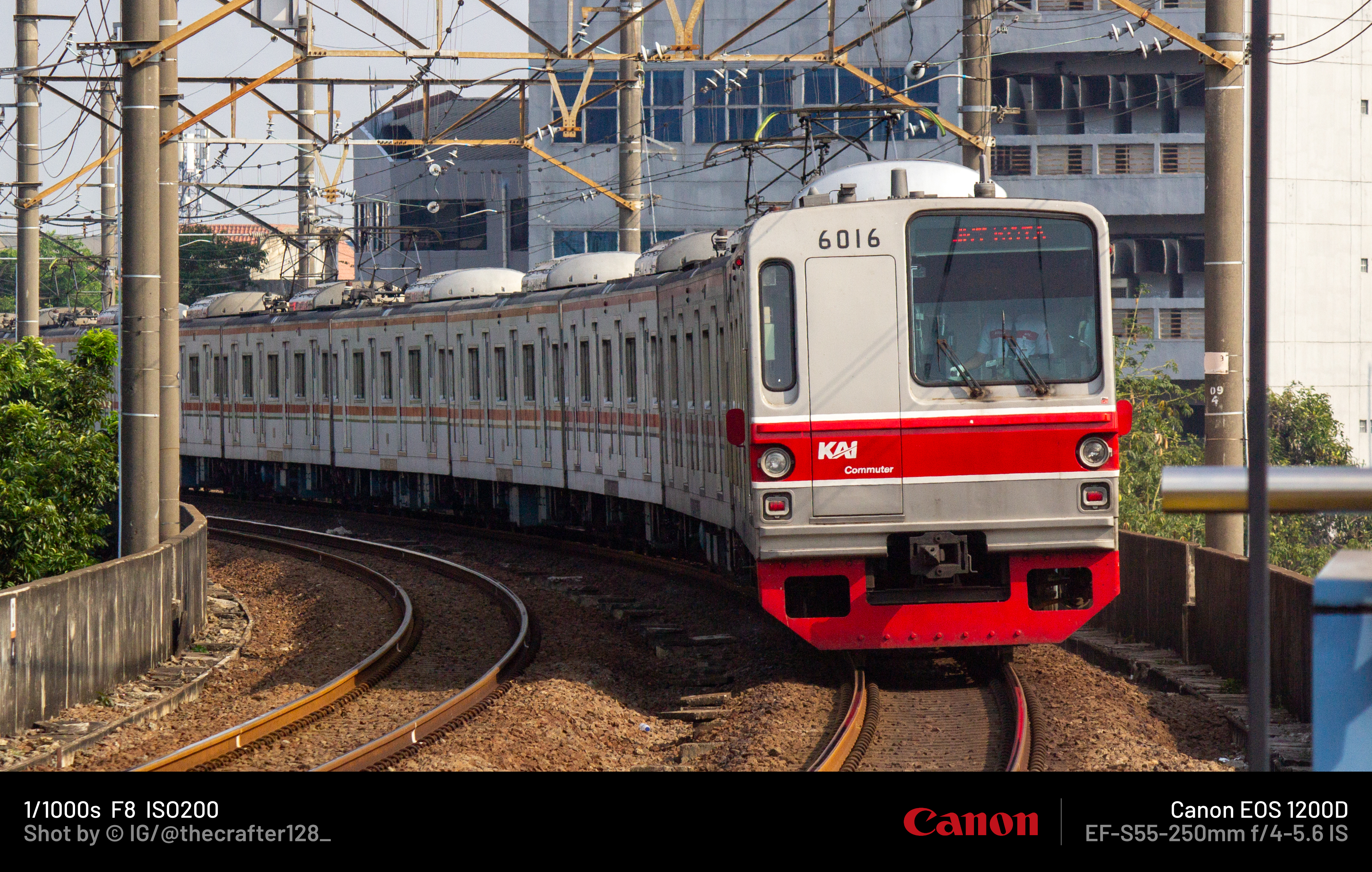
Tokyo Metro trainset 6116F leaving Juanda Station

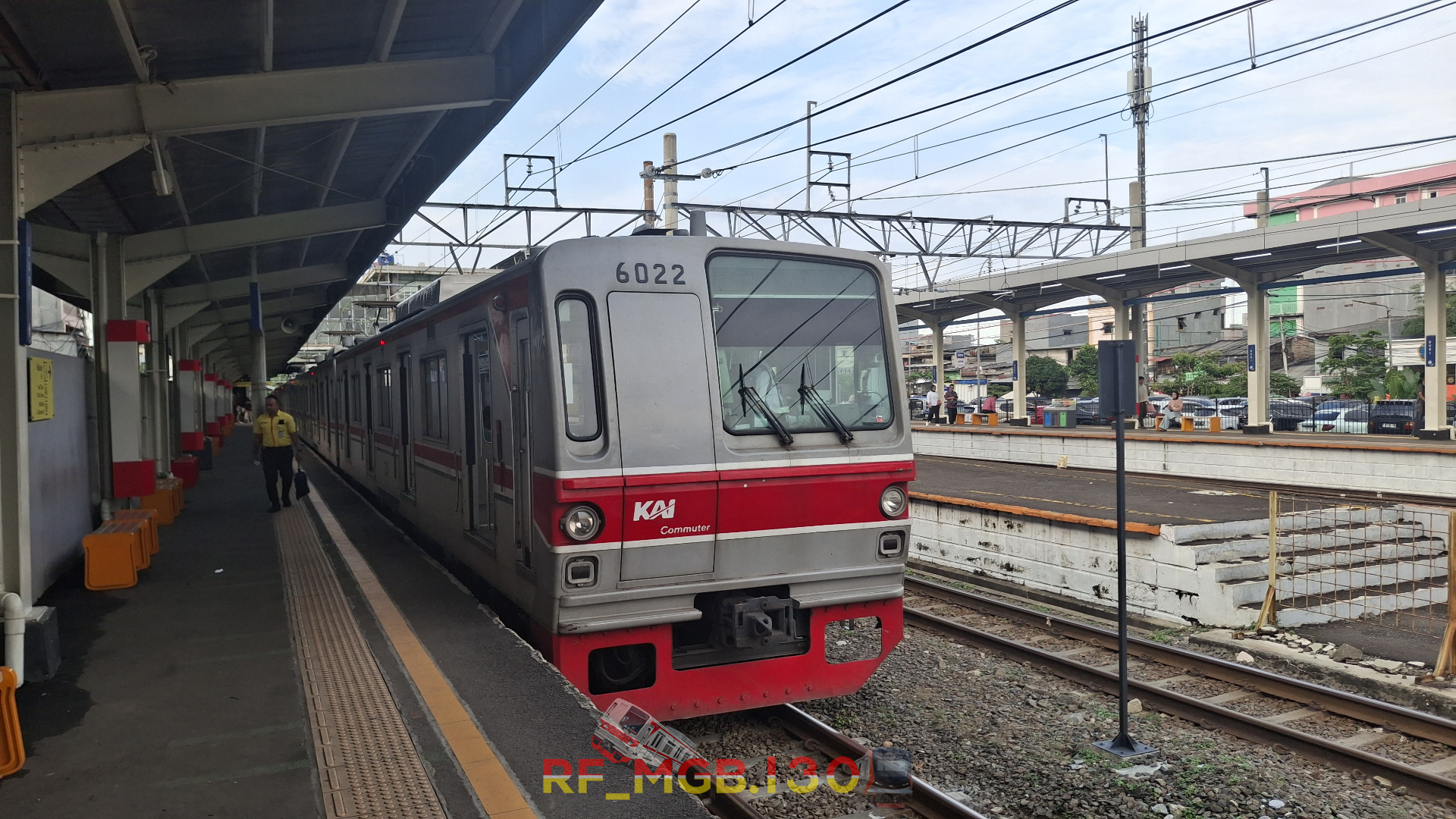
Tokyo Metro 6022 - 6122 At Duri Station On Platform 5 In Tangerang Line
