= Marşandiz railway station =

Railway station in Ankara, Turkey

MARŞANDİZ
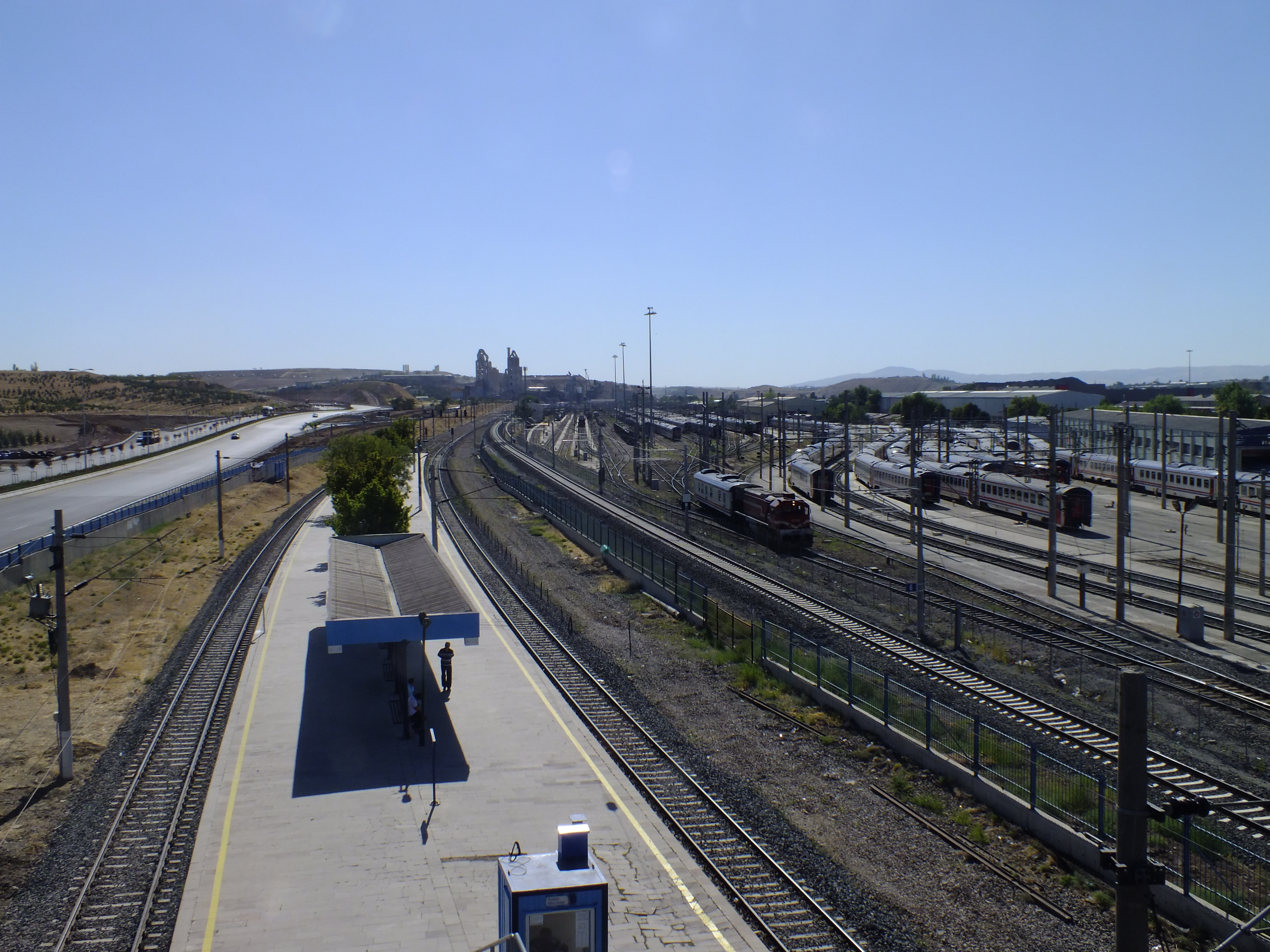
- The station in 2013 before reconstruction. Marşandiz Yard is visible to the right.

General information
- Location: Güvercinlik Cd., Bahçekapı Mah., 06797; Etimesgut/Ankara; Turkey
- Coordinates: 39.9342°N 32.7783°E
- System: TCDD commuter rail station
- Owner: Turkish State Railways
- Operator: TCDD Taşımacılık
- Line: Başkentray
- Platforms: 1 island platform
- Tracks: 5

Construction
- Parking: No
- Cycle facilities: No
- Accessible: Yes

History
- Opened: 1944
- Closed: 2016-17
- Rebuilt: 1970

Services
Preceding station	TCDD Taşımacılık	Following station
Behiçbey towards Sincan	Başkentray	Gazi towards Kayaş
Track layout
Location

Marşandiz railway station is a railway station on the Başkentray commuter rail line in Ankara, Turkey. It is located adjacent to Marşandiz Yard and services mainly railway employees who work there. In July 2016, the station was closed down ad subsequently demolished and rebuilt as part of the Başkentray rehabilitation project. The new station site was moved about 200 m (660 ft) east and opened on 12 April 2018. Marşandiz station also replaced Motor Fabrikası station, which closed down in 2016, hence the relocation to the east. Before 2016, the station had one exit to Anadolu Boulevard, which crossed the tracks on a north-south axis. The new station will no longer have access to the Boulevard and will instead have exits to Güvercinlik Avenue and Güvercin Road.

Marşandiz station was opened in 1944 by the Turkish State Railways, along with the yard maintenance facilities.

On 13 December 2018, a fatal collision between a high-speed passenger train and a maintenance locomotive occurred at the station. Nine people were killed and more than 80 others were injured.
