= National Medical Rescue Team (UMKE) =

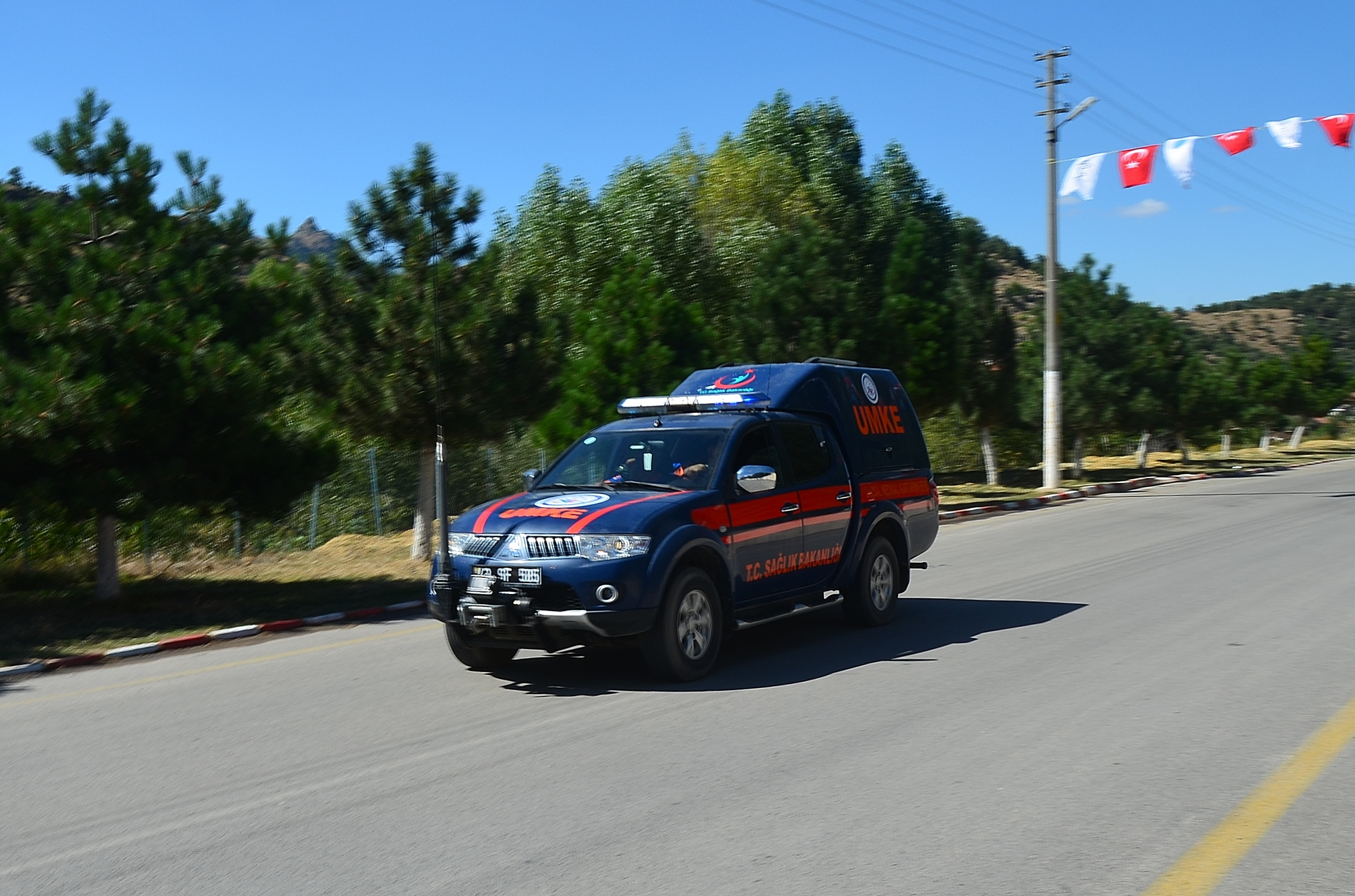
A vehicle of UMKE in deployment.

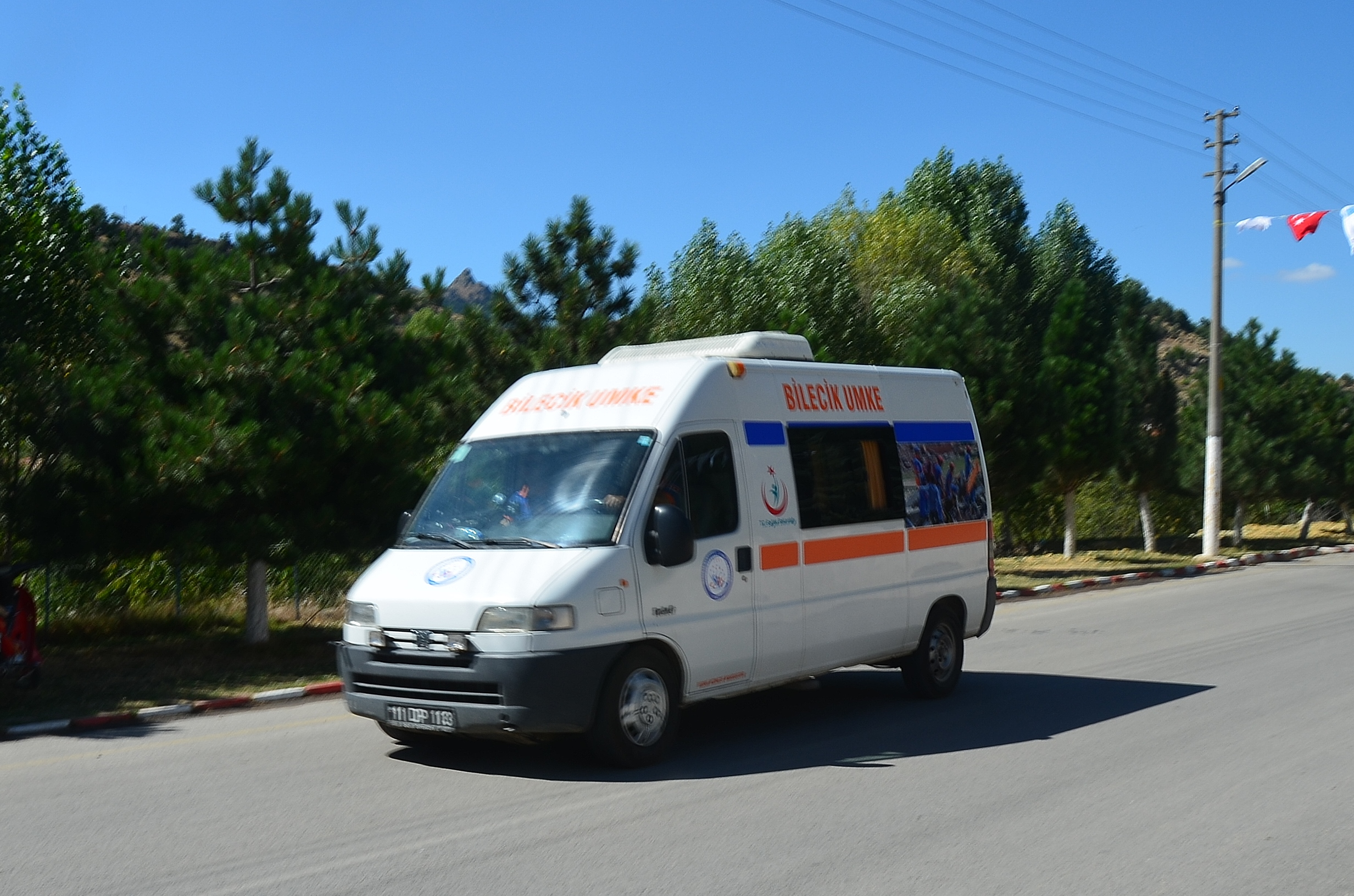
An ambulance of UMKE in deployment.

National Medical Rescue Team (Turkish: Ulusal Medikal Kurtarma Ekibi, UMKE) is a Turkish governmental emergency service organization for medical assistance in natural disasters and accidents. UMKE is part of the Ministry of Health. It is specialized in medical disaster relief at site. In addition to the first aid at the site of extraordinary events, it also provides health care with other medical personnel at nearby hospitals to preserve life, prevent the condition from worsening, or promote recovery.

Following the August 17 İzmit and November 12 Düzce earthquakes in Turkey in 1999, a restructuring of the emergency organizations in the country became inevitable. The National Medical Rescue Team was established by a governmental executive order in 2004. With its over 4,900 personnel in 21 regions, and all 81 provinces, it is capable of providing 24/7 service on natural disasters and extraordinary events in and outside the country.

Staff are selected among specialized health care personnel on voluntary basis. Personnel from other governmental or private health organizations can join, and participate at training and exercises at various times during the year. The appointment for participation at disaster relief is ordered by the ministry or the province governor of the event site. To carry out the necessary logistics, transportation and technical works, voluntary support personnel are at service.
