= Batımerkez =

Batı Merkez (Ankara Metro)
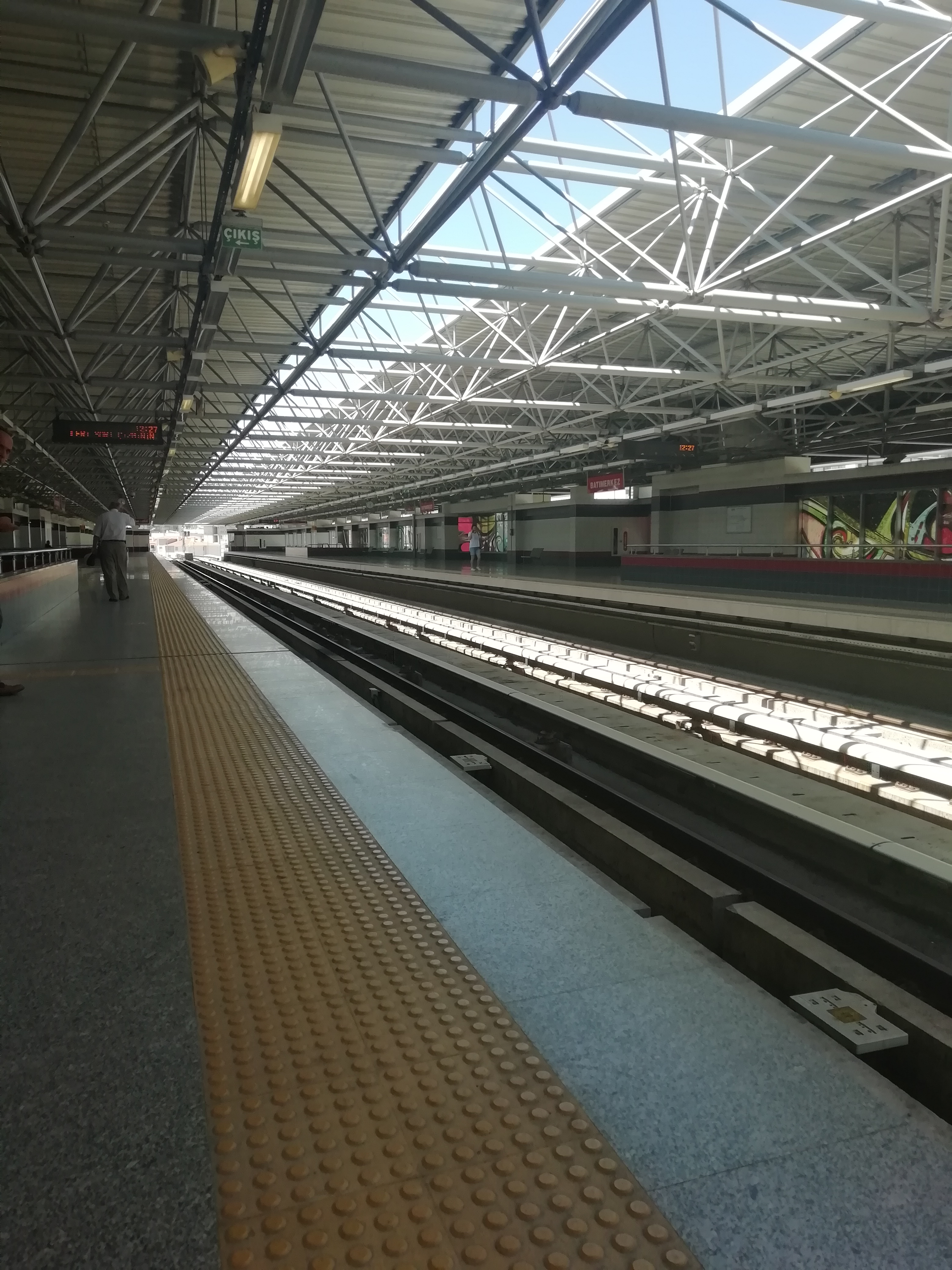
- The M3 platform, Batıkent direction platform.

General information
- Location: Kentkoop Mah., Batıkent 06370; Yenimahalle
- Coordinates: 39.96776°N 32.71532°E
- System: Ankara Metro rapid transit station
- Owner: Ankara Metropolitan Municipality
- Operator: EGO
- Line: M3
- Platforms: 2 side platforms
- Tracks: 2

Construction
- Structure type: Elevated
- Parking: Yes
- Accessible: Yes

History
- Opened: 12 February 2014
- Electrified: 750V DC Third Rail

Services
Preceding station	Ankara Metro	Following station
Mesa toward OSB-Törekent	M3	Batıkent toward M1
Location

Batı Merkez, is a surface rapid transit station of the Ankara Metro. Currently, only one line is in operation at this station. The station was opened on 12 February 2014, the same day the M3 line opened.
