= Mesa (Ankara Metro) =

MESA
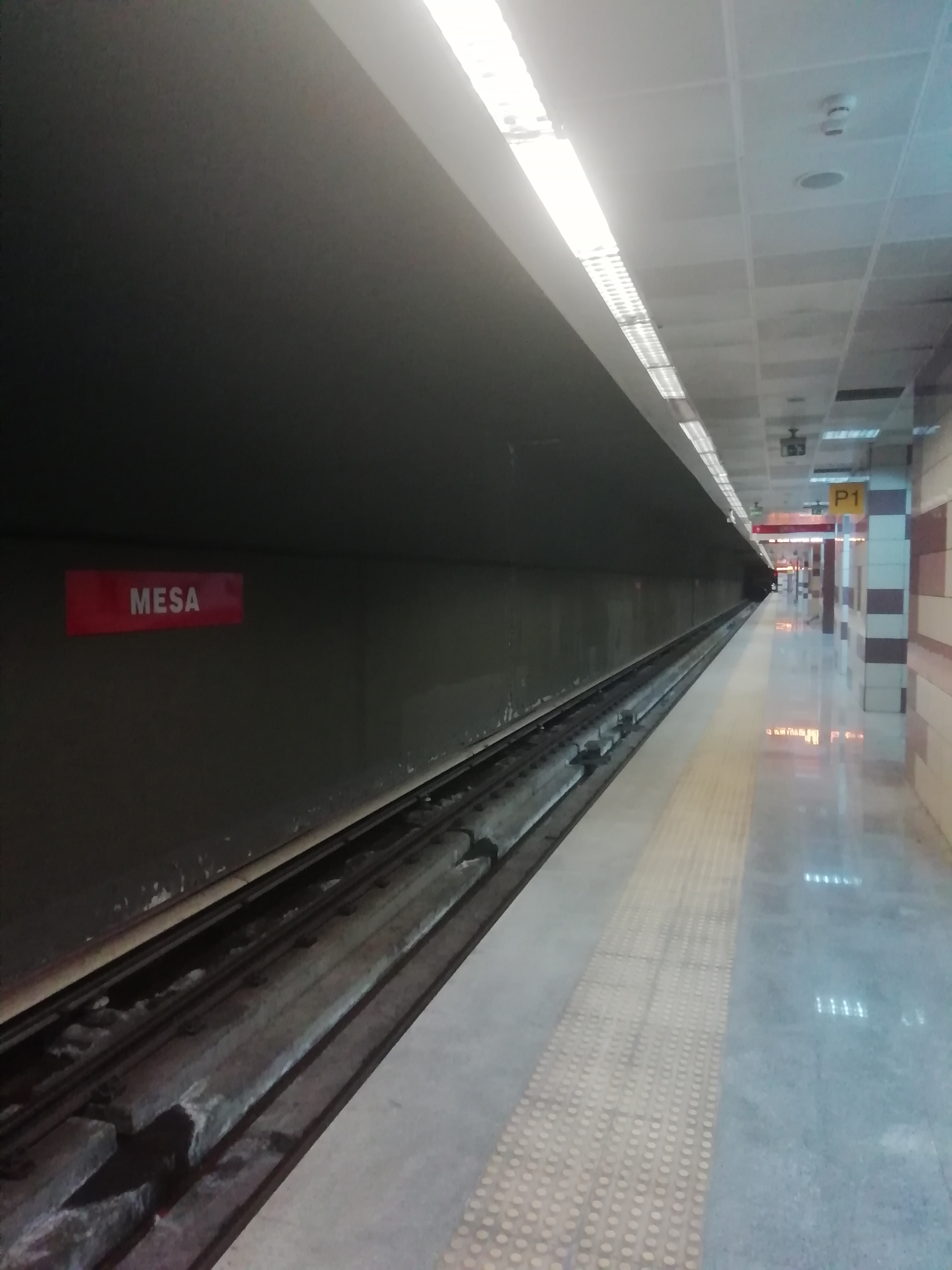
- The M3 platform, OSB-Törekent direction platform.

General information
- Location: Kardelen Mah., Batıkent 06370; Yenimahalle
- Coordinates: 39.971667°N 32.703222°E
- System: Ankara Metro rapid transit station
- Owner: Ankara Metropolitan Municipality
- Operator: EGO
- Line: M3
- Platforms: 1 island platform
- Tracks: 2

Construction
- Structure type: Underground
- Parking: No
- Accessible: Yes

History
- Opened: 12 February 2014
- Electrified: 750V DC Third Rail

Services
Preceding station	Ankara Metro	Following station
Botanik toward OSB-Törekent	M3	Batımerkez toward Batıkent
Location

Mesa, is an underground rapid transit station of the Ankara Metro. Currently, only one line is in operation at this station. The station was opened on 12 February 2014, the same day that the M3 line opened.
