= Macunköy (Ankara Metro) =

Surface station of Ankara Metro in Turkey

MACUNKÖY
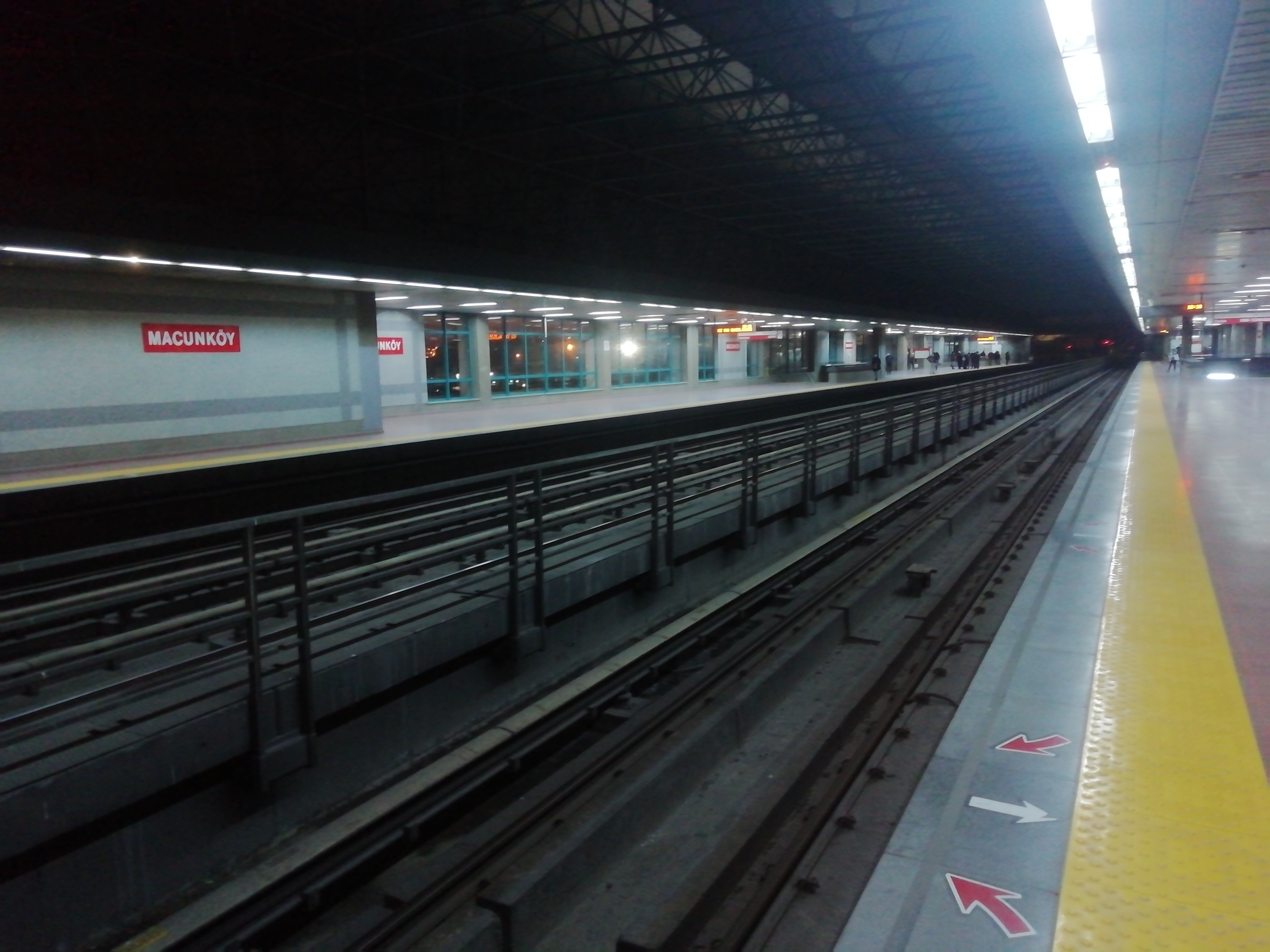
- The P1 Platform, Batıkent direction platform.

General information
- Location: Mehmet Akif Ersoy Mah., 06200; Yenimahalle
- Coordinates: 39.971833°N 32.766806°E
- System: Ankara Metro rapid transit station
- Owner: Ankara Metropolitan Municipality
- Operator: EGO
- Line: M1
- Platforms: 2 side platforms
- Tracks: 3

Construction
- Structure type: Underground
- Parking: Yes
- Accessible: Yes

History
- Opened: 29 December 1997
- Electrified: 750V DC Third Rail

Services
| Preceding station | Ankara Metro | Following station |
|---|---|---|
| Ostim toward Batıkent | M1 | Hastane toward Kızılay |
Location

Macunköy, is a surface rapid transit station of the Ankara Metro. Currently, only one line is in operation at this station. The station was opened on 29 December 1997, the same day that the M1 line opened. This station is the main depot station in Ankara Metro (the other depot station being located at Koru station). Trains are added to and removed from the system from this station. The 3rd rail is located in the middle of the station is used to store the backup train or the removal process of the trains. The addition process is done with a railway switch that connects to the mainline from the 4th line close to the station.
