= Ulus (Ankara Metro) =

Underground station of Ankara Metro in Turkey

ULUS
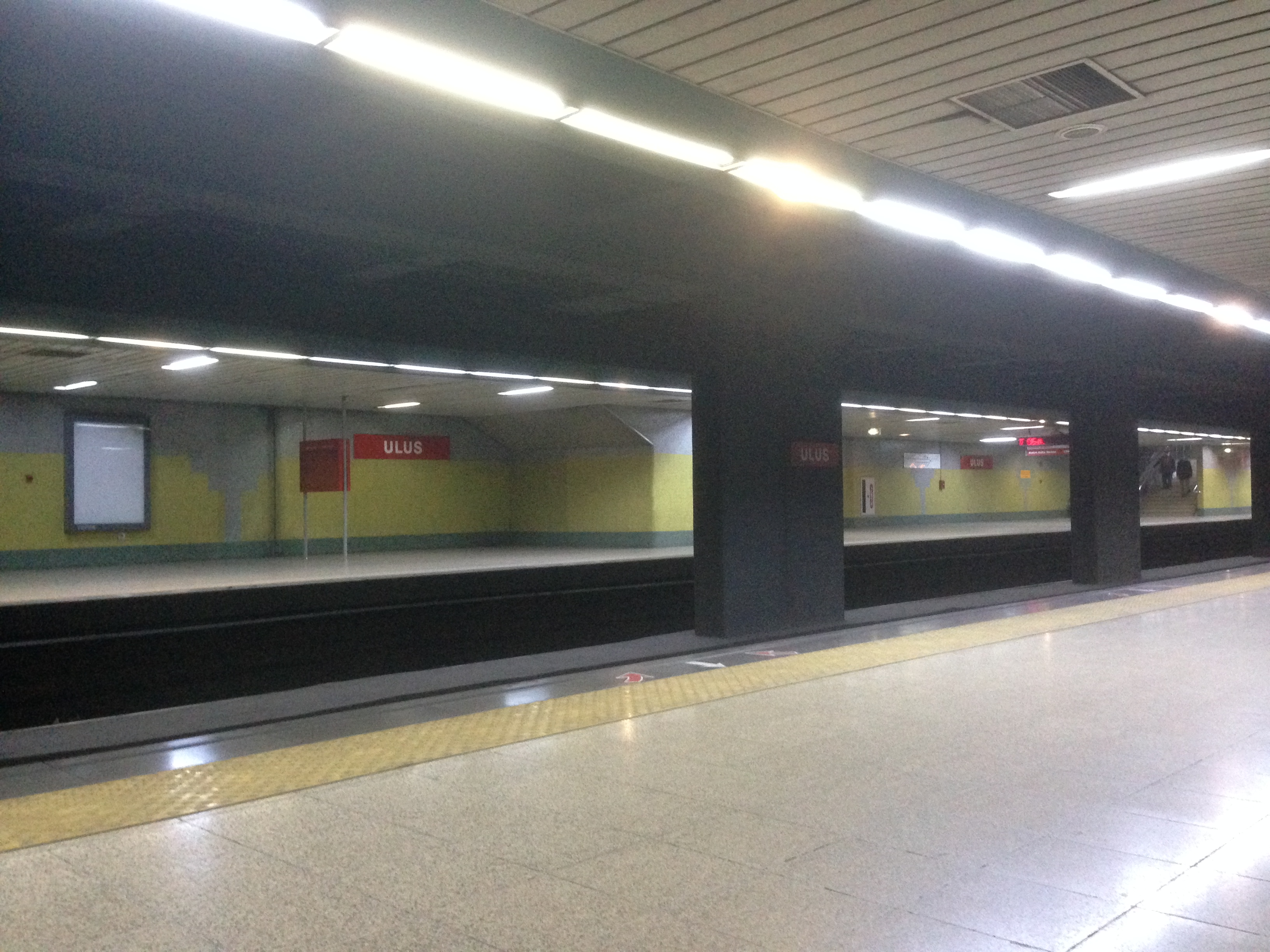

General information
- Location: İstanbul Cd., Anafartalar Mah., 06050; Altındağ
- Coordinates: 39.9398°N 32.8507°E
- System: Ankara Metro rapid transit station
- Owner: Ankara Metropolitan Municipality
- Operator: EGO
- Line: M1
- Platforms: 2 side platforms
- Tracks: 2
- Connections: EGO Bus: 201-6, 318, 318-6, 319, 354, 354-3, 377, 394-3

Construction
- Structure type: Underground
- Accessible: Yes

History
- Opened: 29 December 1997
- Electrified: 750V DC Third Rail

Services
Preceding station	Ankara Metro	Following station
Atatürk Kültür Merkezi toward Batıkent	M1	Sıhhiye toward Kızılay
Location

Ulus is an underground station on the M1 line of the Ankara Metro in Altındağ, Ankara. The station is located beneath Istanbul Avenue at its intersection with Cumhuriyet Avenue. Ulus was opened on 29 December 1997 along with the M1 line. Ulus is located within the historic center of Ankara, with many historic government buildings in the vicinity.

== Nearby Places of Interest ==
- Ankara 19 Mayıs Stadium
- Republic Museum - Second parliament building of Turkey.
- Gençlik Park
- Ulus Square
