= Atatürk Kültür Merkezi (Ankara Metro) =

Subway station in Ankara, Turkey

ATATÜRK KÜLTÜR MERKEZİ
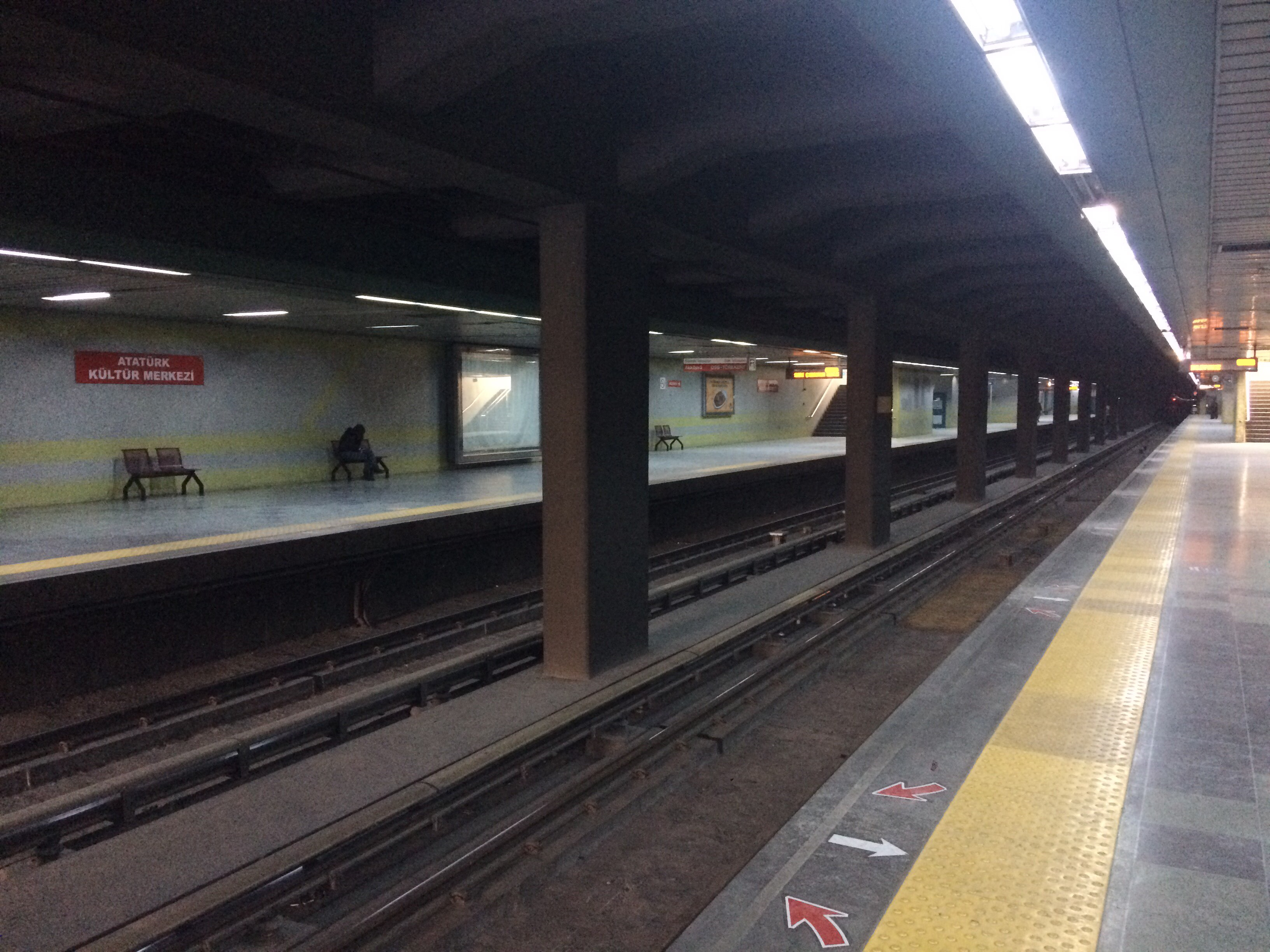

General information
- Location: İstanbul Cd., Zübeyda Hanım Mah., 06070; Altındağ
- Coordinates: 39.9443°N 32.8440°E
- System: Ankara Metro rapid transit station
- Owner: Ankara Metropolitan Municipality
- Operator: EGO
- Lines: M1; M4
- Platforms: 2 side platforms
- Tracks: 2
- Connections: EGO Bus: 201-6, 527-2

Construction
- Structure type: Underground
- Accessible: Yes

History
- Opened: 29 December 1997 (M1 platform); 5 January 2017 (M4 platform)
- Electrified: 750V DC Third Rail

Services
Preceding station	Ankara Metro	Following station
Akköprü toward Batıkent	M1	Ulus toward Kızılay
Gar toward Kızılay	M4	ASKİ toward Şehitler-Gazino
Location

Atatürk Kültür Merkezi is an underground station of the Ankara Metro in Altındağ, Ankara. It is a stop on the M1 line as well as the former southern terminus of the M4 line. The station is located along Istanbul Avenue at the intersection with Kazım Karabekir Avenue. Connection to EGO Bus service is available on Istanbul Avenue. The M1 station was opened on 29 December 1997, while the M4 station opened 19 years later on 5 January 2017.

== Nearby places of interest ==
- Atatürk Cultural Center
- Ankara 19 Mayıs Stadium

== Images ==
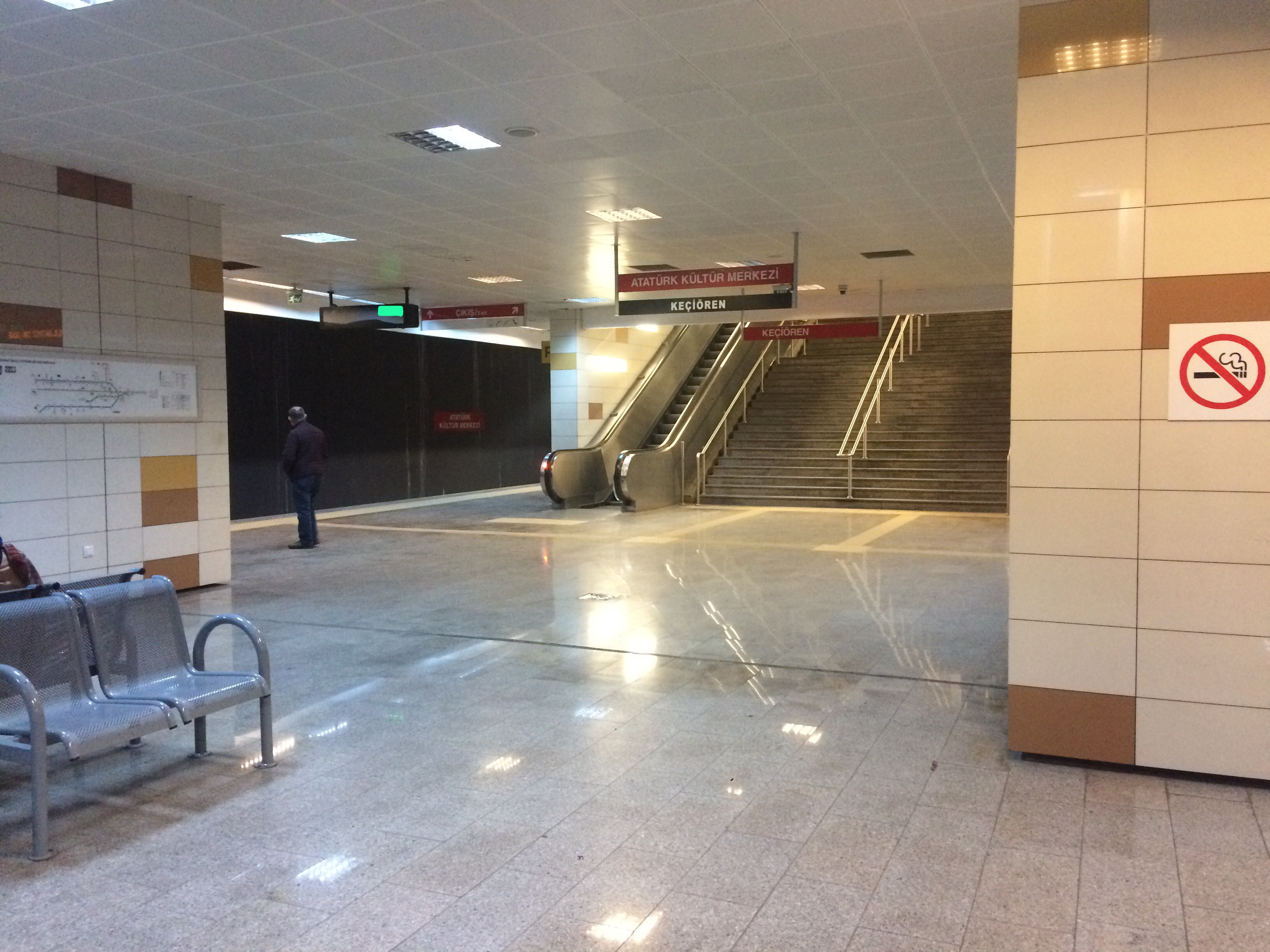
M4 line station
