= Sıhhiye (Ankara Metro) =

Underground station of Ankara Metro in Turkey

SIHHİYE
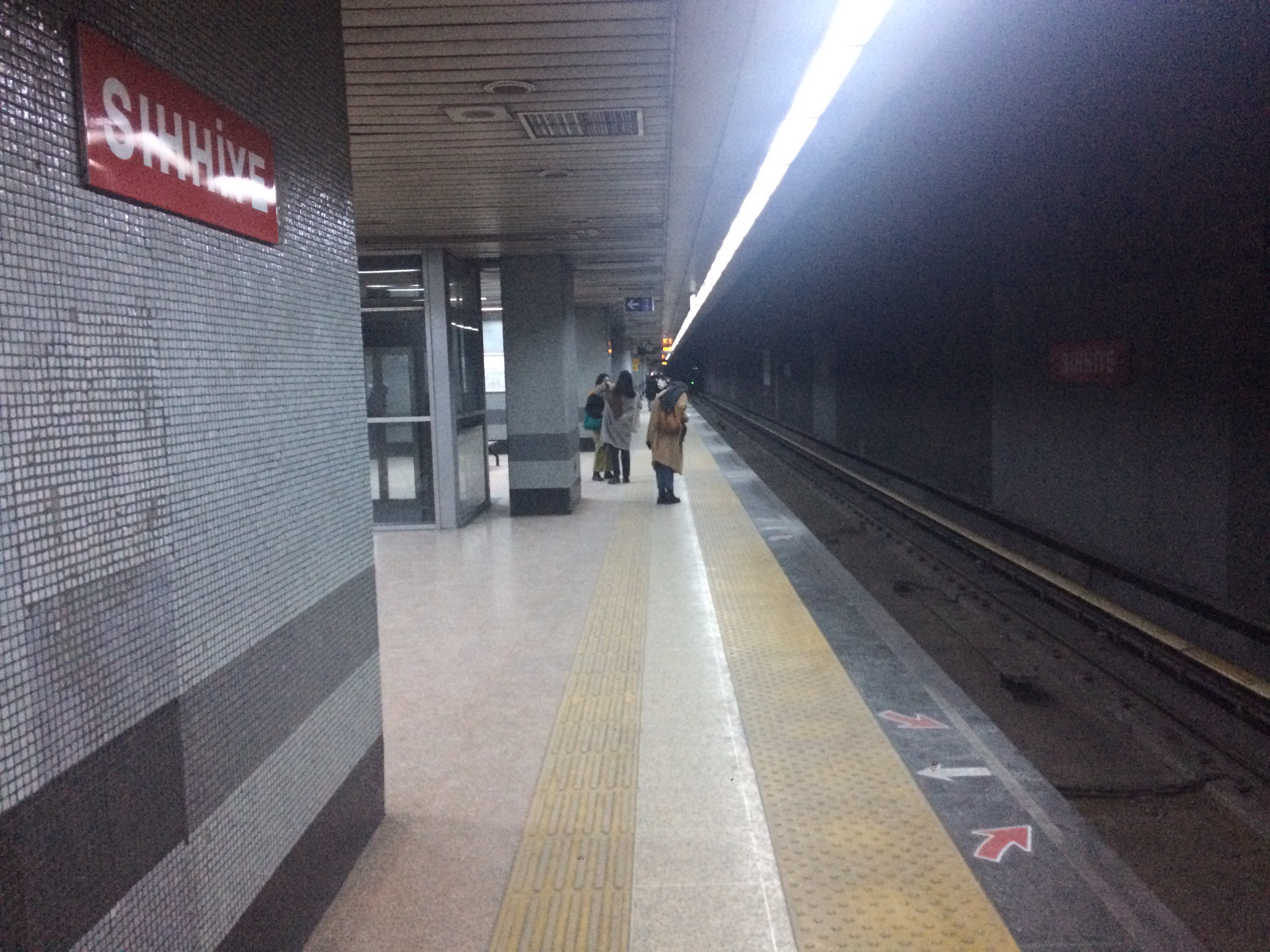

General information
- Location: Atatürk Blv., Korkutreis Mah., 06430; Çankaya
- Coordinates: 39.9280°N 32.8549°E
- System: Ankara Metro rapid transit station
- Owner: Ankara Metropolitan Municipality
- Operator: EGO
- Line: M1
- Platforms: 2 side platforms
- Tracks: 2
- Connections: TCDD Taşımacılık at Yenişehir; EGO Bus: 160, 203, 252, 253, 256-2, 261, 263 266, 263-2, 263-3, 279, 279-2, 284, 285-2, 286, 312, 312-1, 313, 314, 317-3, 318, 319, 320, 322, 322-4, 335, 339-3, 345, 355, 355-4, 357, 361, 377, 381, 395, 407, 408, 427, 427-3, 492, 542, 530-3

Construction
- Structure type: Underground
- Accessible: Yes

History
- Opened: 29 December 1997
- Electrified: 750V DC Third Rail

Services
Preceding station	Ankara Metro	Following station
Ulus toward Batıkent	M1	Kızılay toward M2
Location

Sıhhiye is an underground station on the M1 line of the Ankara Metro in Çankaya, Ankara. The station is located beneath Atatürk Boulevard at its intersection with Celal Bayar Boulevard. Connection to TCDD Taşımacılık train service at Yenişehir is available. Sıhhiye was opened on 29 December 1997 along with the M1 line.

== Nearby Places of Interest ==
- Ankara Palace of Justice
- School of Language and History - Geography
- Ankara University Medical School
- Abdi İpekçi Park
