= Şehitler-Gazino (Ankara Metro) =

Underground station of Ankara Metro in Turkey

ŞEHİTLER
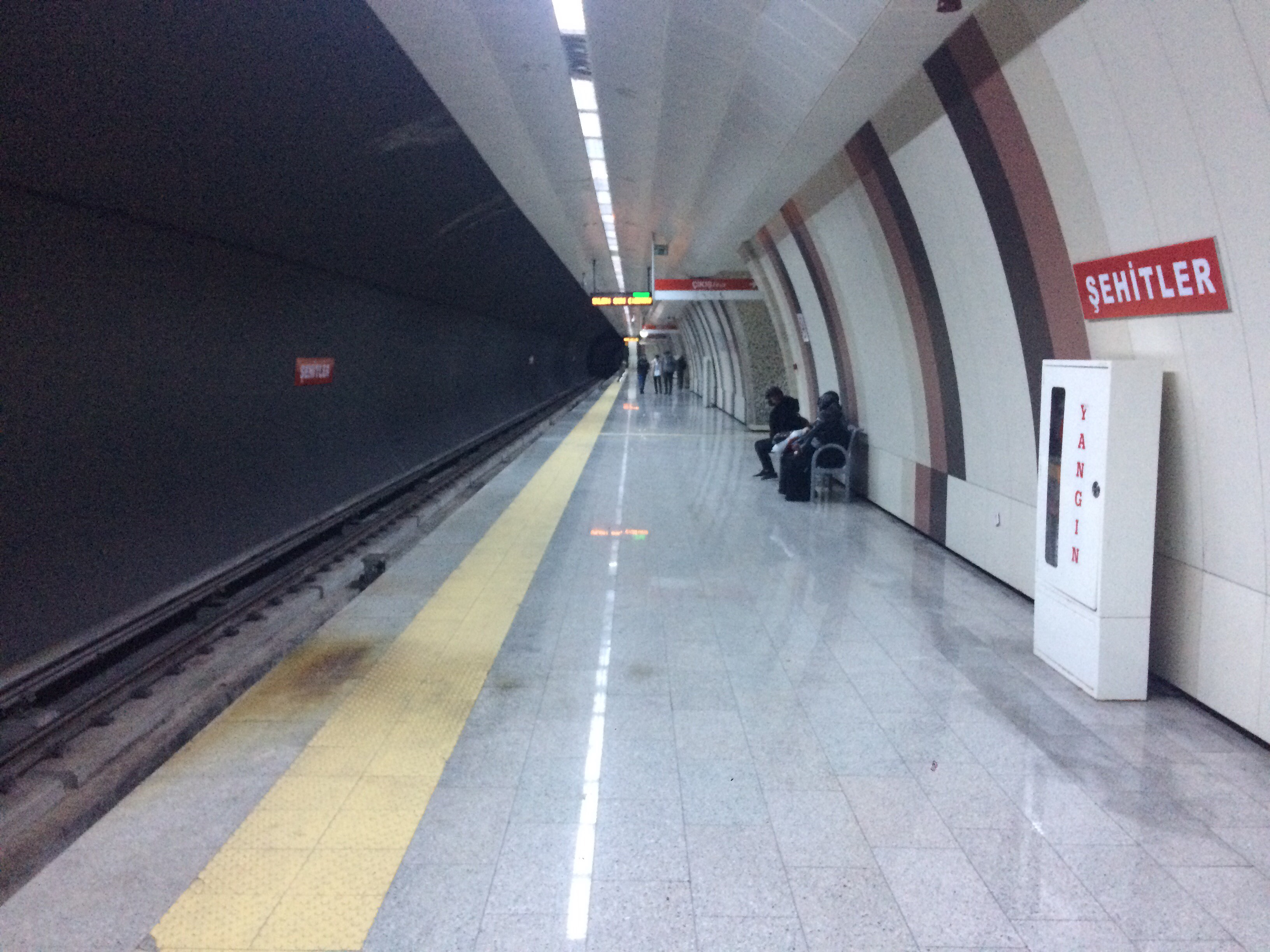
- The M4 platform, Atatürk Kültür Merkezi direction platform.

General information
- Location: Aksaray Mah., Pınarbaşı 06280; Keçiören
- Coordinates: 39.99621°N 32.86102°E
- System: Ankara Metro rapid transit station
- Owner: Ankara Metropolitan Municipality
- Operator: EGO
- Line: M4
- Platforms: 1 middle platforms
- Tracks: 2

Construction
- Structure type: Underground
- Parking: No
- Accessible: Yes

History
- Opened: 5 January 2017
- Electrified: 750V DC Third Rail
- Former names: Gazino

Services
Preceding station	Ankara Metro	Following station
Dutluk toward Kızılay	M4	Terminus
Location

Şehitler is an underground rapid transit station of the Ankara Metro. The station was opened on 5 January 2017, the same day the M4 line opened which is also one of the terminus stations of the line.

== Platform Structure ==
M4 Line
↓ Terminus Tunnel ↑ | ⇌ 2 1 ⇌ | ↓ Dutluk ↑
↓ Terminus Tunnel ↑ | ⇌ 2 1 ⇌ | ↓ Dutluk ↑	1 - 2	North	for Atatürk Kültür Merkezi・(YHT Gar・Kızılay)
