= Ankaray =

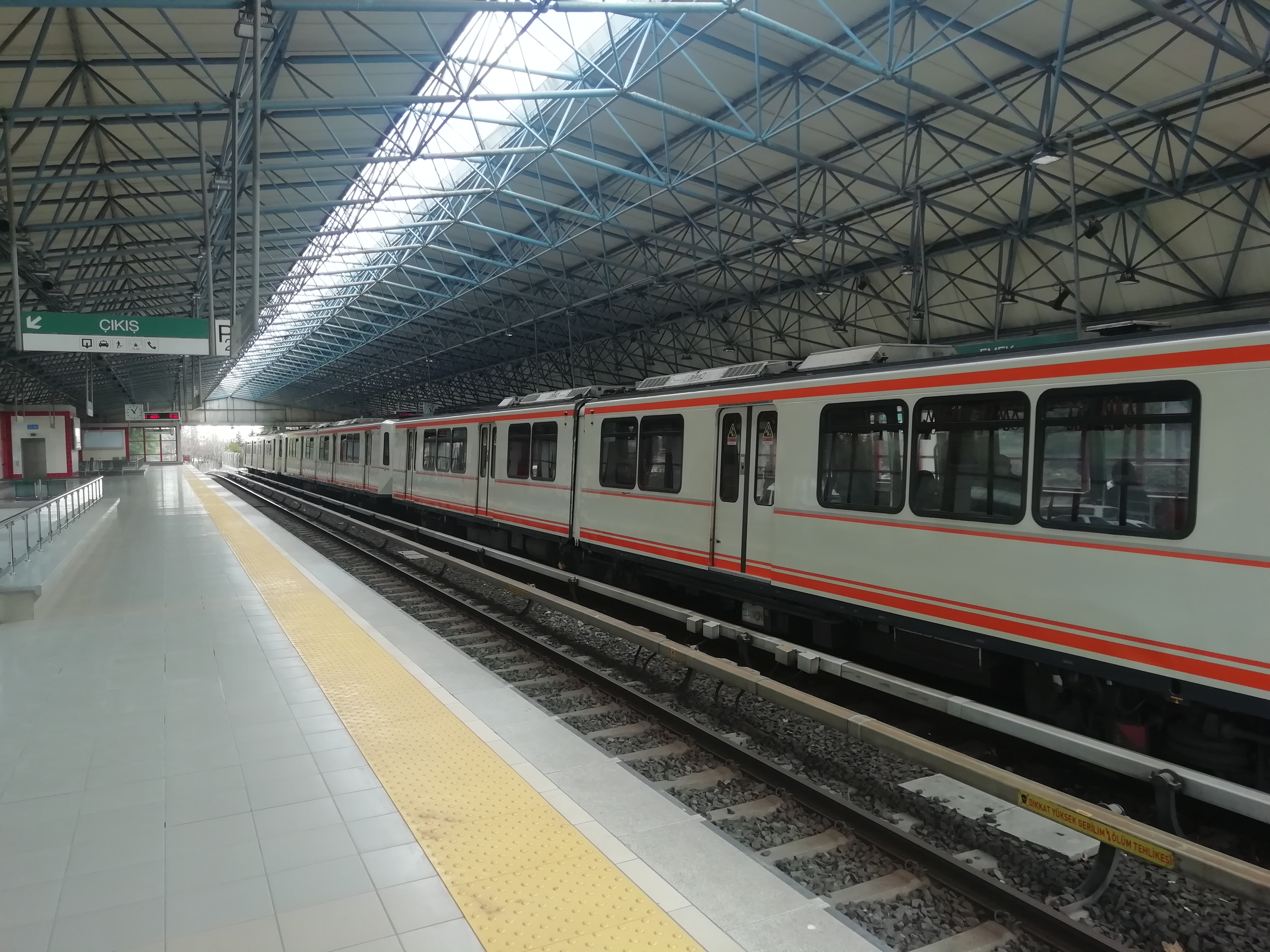

Overview
- Status: Operating; A1 (AŞTİ - Dikimevi); Under construction A1 (Söğütözü - AŞTİ); A2 (Dikimevi - Natoyolu)
- Owner: Ankara Metropolitan Municipality
- Locale: Ankara, Turkey
- Coordinates: 39.9165°N 32.8077°E (terminus)
- Termini: AŞTİ (West); Dikimevi (East)
- Stations: 11 (In operation) + 9 (Under construction)
- Website: Official website

Service
- Type: Rapid transit
- System: Ankara Metro
- Services: 1 (In operation) + 1 (Under construction)
- Route number: A1
- Operator: EGO Genel Müdürlüğü
- Depot: Söğütözü
- Rolling stock: 33 Breda (now Hitachi Rail Italy)
- Daily ridership: 105,634 (2024 daily average)

History
- Opened: 30 August 1996; 30 years ago

Technical
- Line length: 8.5 km (5.3 mi)
- Number of tracks: 2
- Track gauge: 1,435 mm (4 ft 8 1/2 in) standard gauge
- Electrification: 750 V DC Third rail
- Operating speed: 38 km/h (24 mph)

Ankaray, designated as the A1, is a 8.5 km (5.3 mi) long rapid transit line of the Ankara Metro system in Ankara, Turkey. Opened in 1996, it is the oldest rapid transit line in Ankara and the second oldest in Turkey after the M1 line of the Istanbul Metro. Ankaray begins at the Ankara Intercity Bus Terminal in southeastern Yenimahalle and runs east to Dikimevi in northeastern Çankaya and consists of 11 stations. In 2017, the line saw over 33.5 million boardings, making it the second busiest line of Ankara Metro, after the M1. Despite being a rapid transit line, the city of Ankara classifies Ankaray as a light-rail line.

The name Ankaray is a portmanteau of the words Ankara and ray (rail).

== History ==
Plans to construct a medium-capacity rapid transit line were included in the City of Ankara's 1990 investment plan. The planned line was reviewed jointly by the Undersecretariat of the Treasury, State Planning Organization, Ministry of Transport and EGO and was approved in late 1991.

The line was planned to begin in Söğütözü and run east to Dikimevi, through Kızılay. At Kızılay, transfer to the under construction M1 line to Batıkent would be possible. Further eastward extension into Mamak was also considered but never approved. Construction of the line began on 7 April 1992 and was completed in 1996. The opening of Ankaray took place on 30 August 1996 in a ceremony in which Prime Minister Necmettin Erbakan inaugurated the line. Ankaray became the second rapid transit line in Turkey, after the M1 line in Istanbul and ahead of the M1 line of the Ankara Metro (1997) and the Bornova—Üçyol Line of the İzmir Metro (2000).

== Operation ==
=== Route ===
Ankaray runs along a 8.527 km (5.298 mi) mostly east-west route from the Ankara Intercity Coach Terminal in Söğütözü to Dikimevi in northeast Çankaya, consisting of 11 stations. The majority of the route is underground, with the exception being the westernmost 0.74 km (0.46 mi) portion of the line between AŞTİ and Emek stations. The route begins at AŞTİ, with the station located on the east side of Mevlana Boulevard, across from the Coach Terminal. The route runs within an embankment to Emek, then heads underground about 254 m (833 ft) north of the station. The route turns east at Bahriye Üçok Avenue and continues under the Avenue, which becomes Gazi Mustafa Kemal Boulevard near Anıtkabir. At Maltepe station, an out-of-system connection to the Ankara railway station is available. The line continues east reaching Kızılay, where transfer to M1 and M2 lines are available. After Kızılay the Ankaray route continues under Ziya Gökalp Avenue, until Kurtuluş. At Kurtuluş, transfer to commuter rail service is available. From Kurtuluş the route continues under Cemal Gürsel Avenue until reaching its eastern terminus, Dikimevi.

=== Fares ===
Like all mass transit in the Ankara area, Ankaray uses the Ankarakart smartcard system. The entire route is within the same fare zone. The cost of a single ride, using the Ankarakart, costs ₺2.50 ($0.67, as of 2018) for a full fare, while a reduced fare ride costs ₺1.75 ($0.47). A non-Ankarakart single ticket costs ₺4 ($1.07). Transferring to Ankaray via another metro line or bus costs ₺1 ($0.27) for full fare and ₺0.25 ($0.07) for reduced fare riders.

=== Stations ===
(*) Starred transfers are under construction.

Ankaray stations
| Station | Distance (km) | Opened | Transfer |
|---|---|---|---|
| AŞTİ | 0 | 30 August 1996 | EGO Bus: 102-2, 104-1, 106-1, 107-6, 109, 157-3, 178-3, 419, 445-2, 484-2 |
| Emek | 0.5 | 30 August 1996 | EGO Bus: 102-1, 104-1, 104-4, 109, 178-3, 339-3, 419, 479 |
| Bahçelievler | 1.4 | 30 August 1996 |
| Beşevler | 2.3 | 30 August 1996 | EGO Bus: 220-3, 221-3, 267, 267-2, 267-4, 339-3, 445-2, 484-2 |
| Anadolu/Anıtkabir | 3.1 | 30 August 1996 | EGO Bus: 273, 339-3, 340, 340-2, 345, 383 |
| Maltepe | 3.6 | 30 August 1996 | Turkish State Railways, Ankara Metro: M4; EGO Bus: 297-7, 330, 330-2, 340, 340-2, 341, 380, 383 |
| Demirtepe | 4.5 | 30 August 1996 | EGO Bus: 220-7, 297-7, 330, 330-2, 340, 340-2, 341, 380, 383 |
| 15 Temmuz Kızılay Milli İrade | 5.3 | 30 August 1996 | Ankara Metro: M1-M2, M4; EGO Bus: 135-2, 173-2, 173-5, 185-2, 185-3, 185-6, 220-7, 297-7, 330, 330-2, 340, 340-2, 341 |
| Kolej | 6 | 30 August 1996 | EGO Bus: 160, 220-7, 297-7, 397-3, 321, 321-6, 324, 326, 329, 330, 333, 334, 334-6, 340, 341, 341-6, 343, 343, 347, 347-6, 348, 350, 353, 355, 355-4, 355-6, 357, 361, 365, 367, 377, 380, 380-6, 382, 383, 392, 392-6 |
| Kurtuluş | 6.8 | 30 August 1996 | Turkish State Railways; EGO Bus: 220-7, 297-7, 324, 326, 329, 330, 330-2, 340, 340-2, 341, 380, 382, 383, 385-2 |
| Dikimevi | 8.5 | 30 August 1996 | EGO Bus: 220-7, 297-7, 321, 321-6, 324, 326, 329, 330, 334, 334-6, 339-3, 340, 341, 341-6, 343, 347, 347-6, 348, 350, 355, 355-4, 355-6, 357, 361, 365, 367, 377, 380, 380-6, 382, 383, 392, 392-6 |

== Rolling stock ==
Ankaray uses different rolling stock than the rest of the Ankara Metro system. Built jointly by AEG and Siemens, they were ordered by the Ankara Municipality in January 1992 and delivered shortly before the opening of the line. A total of 33 cars were built and delivered for the line; 22 with an operator's cabin and 11 without.

Trains draw power via third rail, which is electrified at 750 V DC. Ankaray trains usually operate with a total of six cars (3 married pairs). Each married pair of cars has a length of 29 m (95 ft) and a width of 2.65 m (8 ft 8 in). All Ankaray rolling stock is stored and maintained at the Söğütözü Maintenance Facility in Yenimahalle.

== Söğütözü expansion ==
Expansion of the Ankaray line from AŞTİ to Söğütözü was approved on 25 April 2011 and construction began in September 2012. The short 0.8 km (0.50 mi) southwest expansion would meet the M2 line at Söğütözü station. The tunnel and station was completed in early 2014, along with the opening of the M2 line from Kızılay to Koru. However, the line has not yet been put into service for reasons unclear.
