= Koru (Ankara Metro) =

Underground station of Ankara Metro in Turkey

KORU
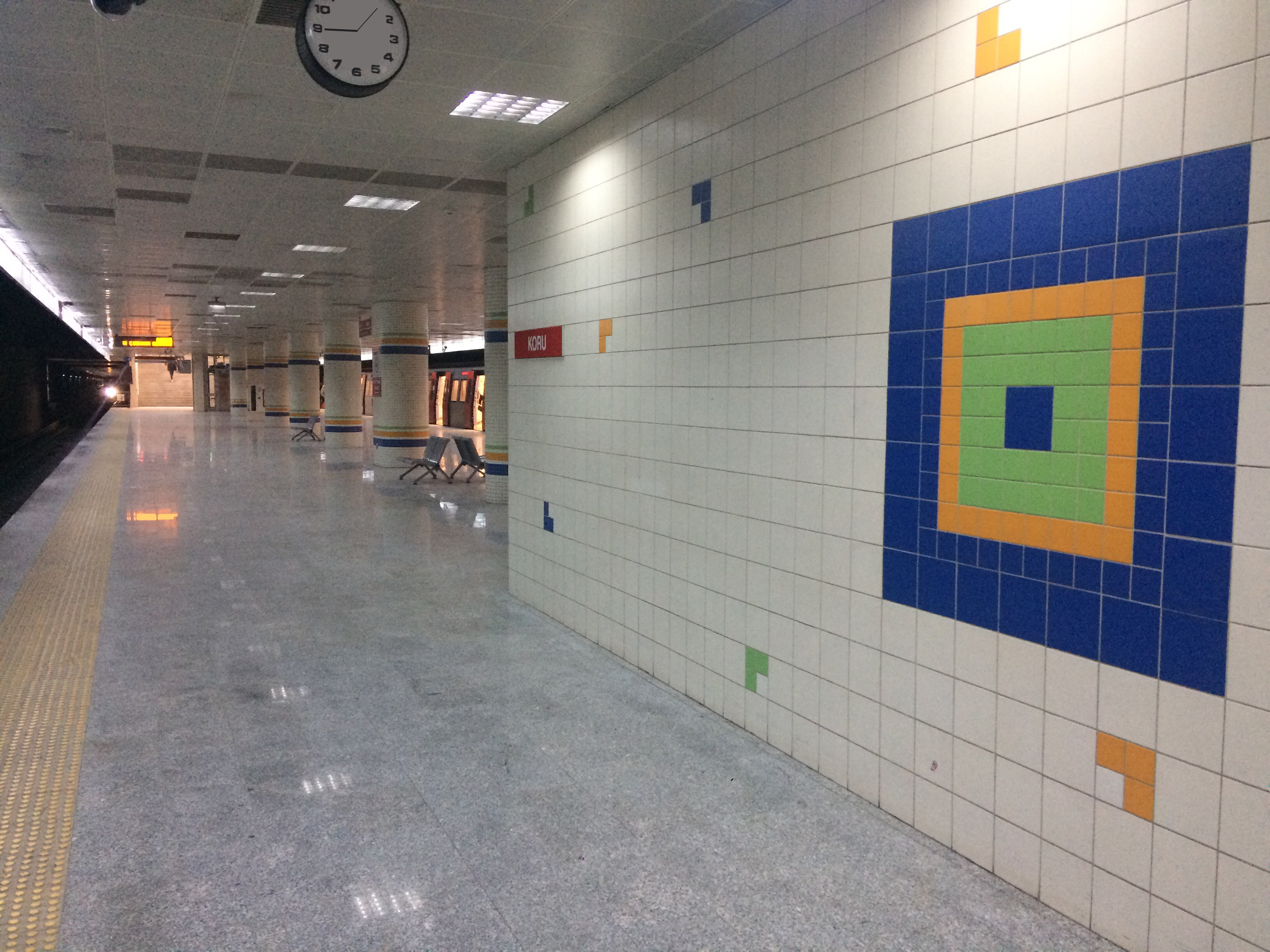

General information
- Location: Ankaralılar Cd., Koru Mah., 06810; Çankaya
- Coordinates: 39.8876°N 32.6870°E
- System: Ankara Metro rapid transit station
- Owner: Ankara Metropolitan Municipality
- Operator: EGO
- Line: M2
- Platforms: 1 island platform
- Connections: EGO Bus: 512, 534, 537, 559, 562, 566, 567, 568, 576, 581, 581-1, 584, 586, 587, 588, 588-1, 590, 592, 592-1, 593, 594, 595, 596, 598, 598-1

Construction
- Structure type: Underground
- Parking: Yes
- Accessible: Yes

History
- Opened: 13 March 2014
- Electrified: 750V DC Third Rail

Services
Preceding station	Ankara Metro	Following station
Terminus	M2	Çayyolu toward Kızılay
Location

Koru is an underground rapid transit station and the western terminus of the M2 line of the Ankara Metro. It is also the southwest terminus of the 46.6 km (29.0 mi) long continuous metro line, consisting of the M1, M2 and M3 lines. The station is located along Ankaralılar Avenue within Ahmet Taner Kışlalı Park and was opened on 13 March 2014. Connections to EGO Bus service is available on Şeyh Mucibur Rahman Boulevard. This station is secondary depot station in Ankara Metro(main depot station located at Macunköy station). Trains are added to and removed from the system from this station. The addition/removal process is done with a railway switch that connects to the mainline from the yard lines close to the station.
