= Ankara Metro =

Metro system serving Ankara, Turkey

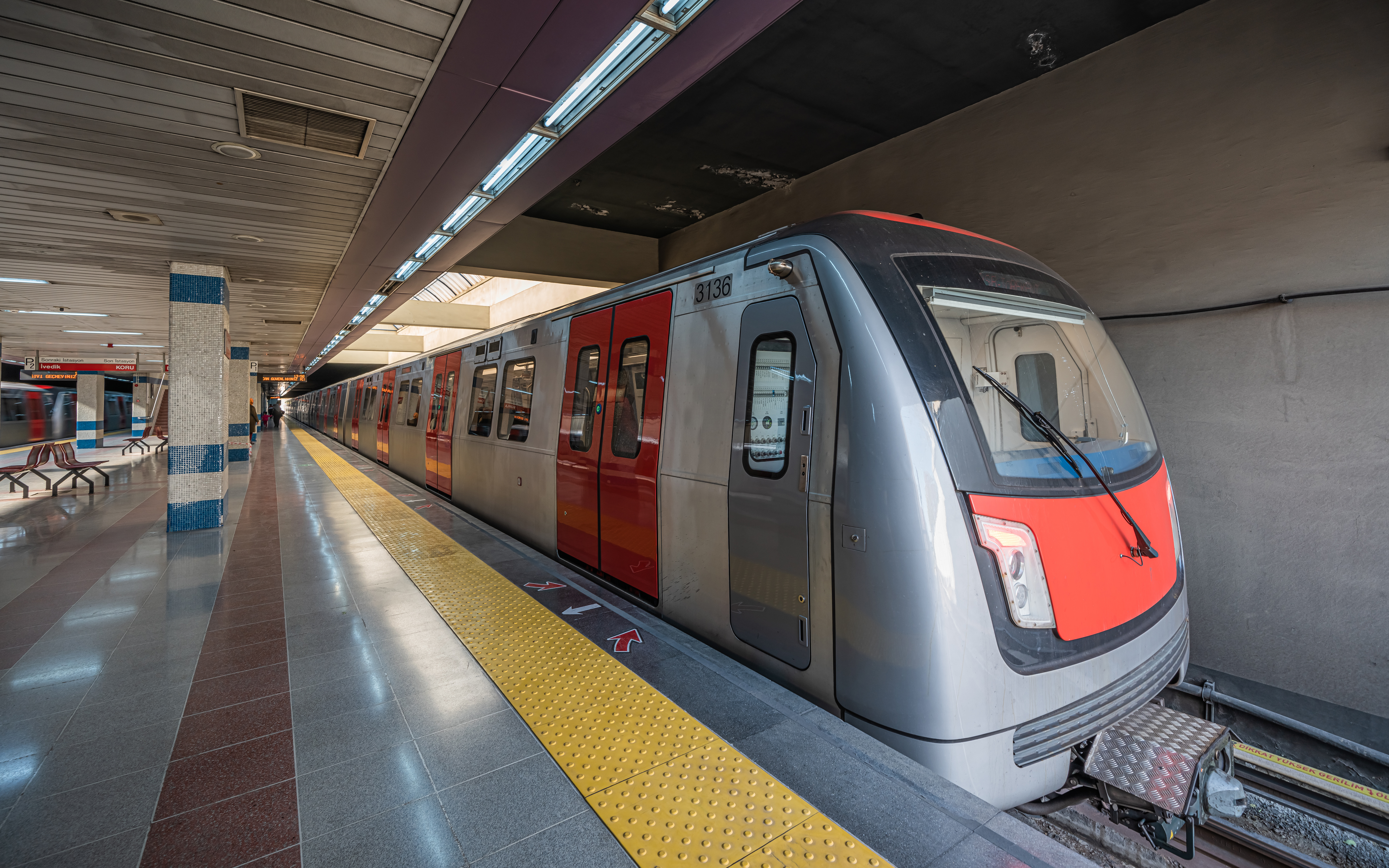
- A train of CRRC metro cars at Yenimahalle station on Line M1, 2021

Overview
- Native name: Ankara Metrosu
- Locale: Ankara, Turkey
- Transit type: Rapid transit
- Number of lines: 3
- Number of stations: 57 (9 more under construction)
- Daily ridership: 474,448 (average, 2025)
- Annual ridership: Ankaray : 38.0 million (2025); Metro : 135.2 million (2025); Total: 173.2 million (2025)
- Website: http://www.ego.gov.tr

Operation
- Began operation: 1996; 30 years ago 1997; 29 years ago
- Operators: Electricity, Gas, Bus General Directorate (EGO)
- Number of vehicles: 432 (108 Bombardier, 324 CRRC) (33 AnsaldoBreda)

Technical
- System length: 67.4 km (41.9 mi)
- Track gauge: 1,435 mm (4 ft 8 1/2 in) standard gauge
- Electrification: 750 V DC Third rail
System map
Ankara metro (with extensions under construction and planned)

The Ankara Metro (Turkish: Ankara Metrosu) is the rapid transit system serving Ankara, the capital of Turkey. At present, the system consists of three lines – the Ankaray (A1), the M1 - M2 - M3 and the M4. The Ankaray, M1, M2, M3 and M4 lines transported 173.2 million passengers in 2025, corresponding to a ridership of approximately 474,448 per day. In July 2018, the M1 and M3 lines were merged into a single service; subsequently, in February 2019, the M2 line was also integrated, providing uninterrupted service between Koru and OSB-Törekent.

== History ==
=== Ankaray ===
The Ankaray (from Turkish: Ankara ray, meaning Ankara rail), a light rail transit system (Turkish: Hafif Raylı Sistem, though the line does operate as more of a "light metro" line) was the first phase of the modern rapid transit network of the city. The Ankaray was constructed by a consortium headed by Siemens over a period of four years (1992–96). It opened on 30 August 1996. The line runs between AŞTİ (Turkish: Ankara Şehirlerarası Terminal İşletmesi – Ankara Intercity Bus Terminal) and Dikimevi, covering a distance of 8.53 kilometres (5.30 mi), of which 6.68 kilometres (4.15 mi) is through tunnels. The line has 11 stations.

=== Ankara Metro ===
The Ankara Metro has been operating since 29 December 1997, with the opening of its first full metro line, M1, traveling between Kızılay, the city center, and Batıkent. The M3 line, which serves almost as an extension of the M1 line, operating from Batıkent to OSB-Törekent, opened on 12 February 2014. The M2 line, operating from Kızılay, the city center, to Koru, opened a month later on 13 March 2014. For the first few years of operations on lines M2 and M3, both of them ran separately from the M1 line; since early 2019, the three lines are operated as one continuous service between OSB-Törekent and Koru.

Test running on the M4 line, which launched construction in 2004, started in August 2016. The first section of the line, running from Şehitler-Gazino to Atatürk Kültür Merkezi, opened on 5 January 2017. The second section of the line, running from Atatürk Kültür Merkezi to Kızılay, opened on 12 April 2023.

In 2019, the Turkish defense firm ASELSAN began traction and control upgrades on the older Bombardier cars.

== Operations ==
=== Lines ===
This table lists the three metro lines (including the Ankaray line) currently in service on the Ankara Metro:

Line	Route	Opened	Length	Stations
ANKARAY (A1)	AŞTİ ↔ Dikimevi	1996	8.53 km (5.30 mi)	11
M1; M2; M3	15 Tem. Kızılay Millî İrade ↔ Batıkent	1997 (as)	14.66 km (9.11 mi)	12
M1; M2; M3	15 Tem. Kızılay Millî İrade ↔ Koru	2014 (as)	16.59 km (10.31 mi)	12
M1; M2; M3	Batıkent ↔ OSB-Törekent	2014 (as)	15.36 km (9.54 mi)	12
M1; M2; M3	15 Tem. Kızılay Milli İrade ↔ OSB-Törekent	2018 (merger of and)	31.95 km (19.85 mi)	23
M1; M2; M3	Koru ↔ OSB-Törekent	2019 (merger of , and )	46.61 km (28.96 mi)	34
M4	15 Tem. Kızılay Millî İrade ↔ Şehitler	2017	12.5 km (7.8 mi)	12
TOTAL:			67.4 km (41.9 mi)	57

=== Stations ===
==== Ankaray (A1-A2) ====
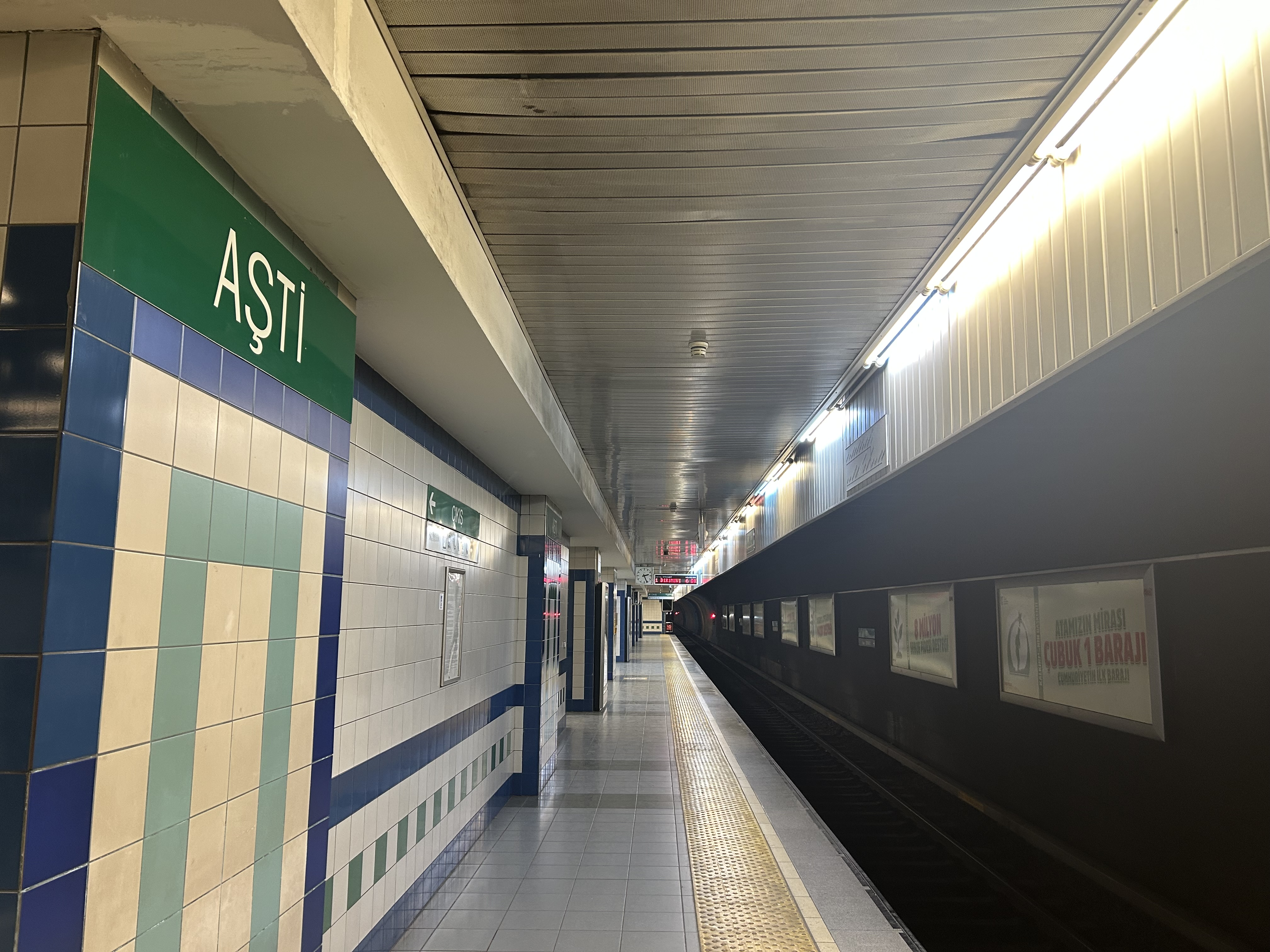
AŞTİ station, the western terminus of the Ankaray

Station	Line	Status	Connections	Notes
Söğütözü	A1	under construction	, Havaş (airport shuttle)	
AŞTİ (Ankara Şehirlerarası Terminal İşletmesi)	A1	in service	Intercity buses; AnkaraAir, Havaş (airport shuttles), 442 airport bus	
Emek	A1	in service		
Bahçelievler	A1	in service		
Beşevler	A1	in service		
Anadolu/Anıtkabir	A1	in service		formerly known as Anadolu/Tandoğan
Maltepe	A1	in service	, TCDD Başkentray (suburban rail), mainline, regional and high speed trains, AnkaraAir (airport shuttle), 442 airport bus	
Demirtepe	A1	in service		
15 Temmuz Kızılay Millî İrade	A1	in service	,,, AnkaraAir (airport shuttle), 442 airport bus	formerly known as Kızılay
Kolej	A1	in service		
Kurtuluş	A1	in service	TCDD Başkentray (suburban rail)	
Dikimevi	A1	in service		
Dikimevi	A2	under construction		
Abidinpaşa	A2	under construction		
Aşık Veysel	A2	under construction		
Tuzluçayır	A2	under construction		
General Zeki Doğan	A2	under construction		
Fahri Korutürk	A2	under construction		
Cengizhan	A2	under construction		
Akşemsettin	A2	under construction		
Natoyolu	A2	under construction		

==== M1 ====
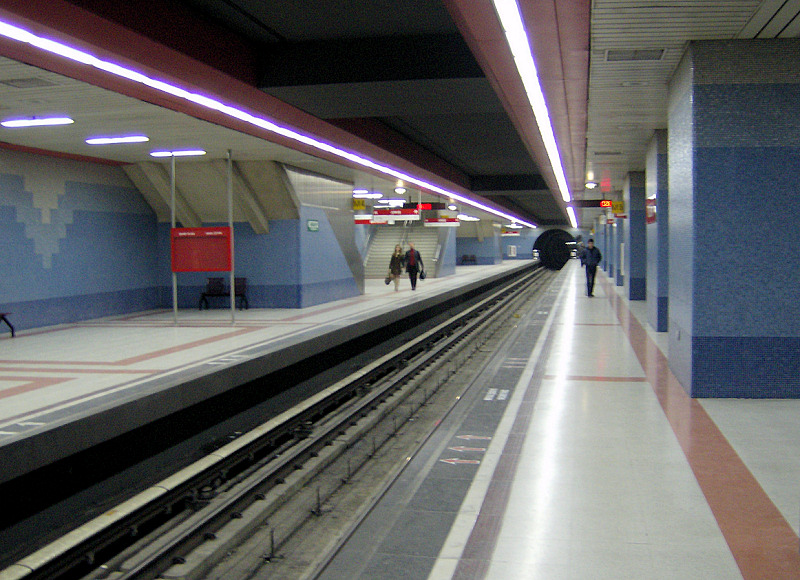
Kızılay station (M1/M2)

Station	Status	Connections	Notes
15 Temmuz Kızılay Millî İrade	in service	Ankaray,,, AnkaraAir (airport shuttle), 442 airport bus	formerly known as Kızılay
Sıhhiye	in service	TCDD Başkentray (suburban rail)	
Ulus	in service	442 airport bus, metrobus (future)	
Atatürk Kültür Merkezi (AKM)	in service	, AnkaraAir (airport shuttle), metrobus (future)	
Akköprü	in service	Havaş (airport shuttle), metrobus (future)	
İvedik	in service		
Yenimahalle	in service	~~Yenimahalle cable car~~ (permanently closed)	
Demetevler	in service		
Hastane	in service		
Macunköy	in service	P+R Park & Ride facility	
Orta Doğu Sanayi ve Ticaret Merkezi (OSTİM)	in service		
Batıkent	in service		

==== M2 ====
Station	Status	Connections	Notes
Koru	in service	P+R Park & Ride facility	
Çayyolu	in service		officially known as Çayyolu 1-2
Ümitköy	in service		
Beytepe	in service		
Tarım Bakanlığı-Danıştay	in service		formerly known as Köy Hizmetleri
Bilkent	in service		
Orta Doğu Teknik Üniversitesi (ODTÜ)	in service		
Maden Tetkik ve Arama (MTA)	in service		
Söğütözü	in service	Ankaray (future expansion), Havaş (airport shuttle)	
Millî Kütüphane	in service	P+R Park & Ride facility	
Necatibey	in service		
15 Temmuz Kızılay Millî İrade	in service	Ankaray,,, AnkaraAir (airport shuttle), 442 airport bus	formerly known as Kızılay

==== M3 ====
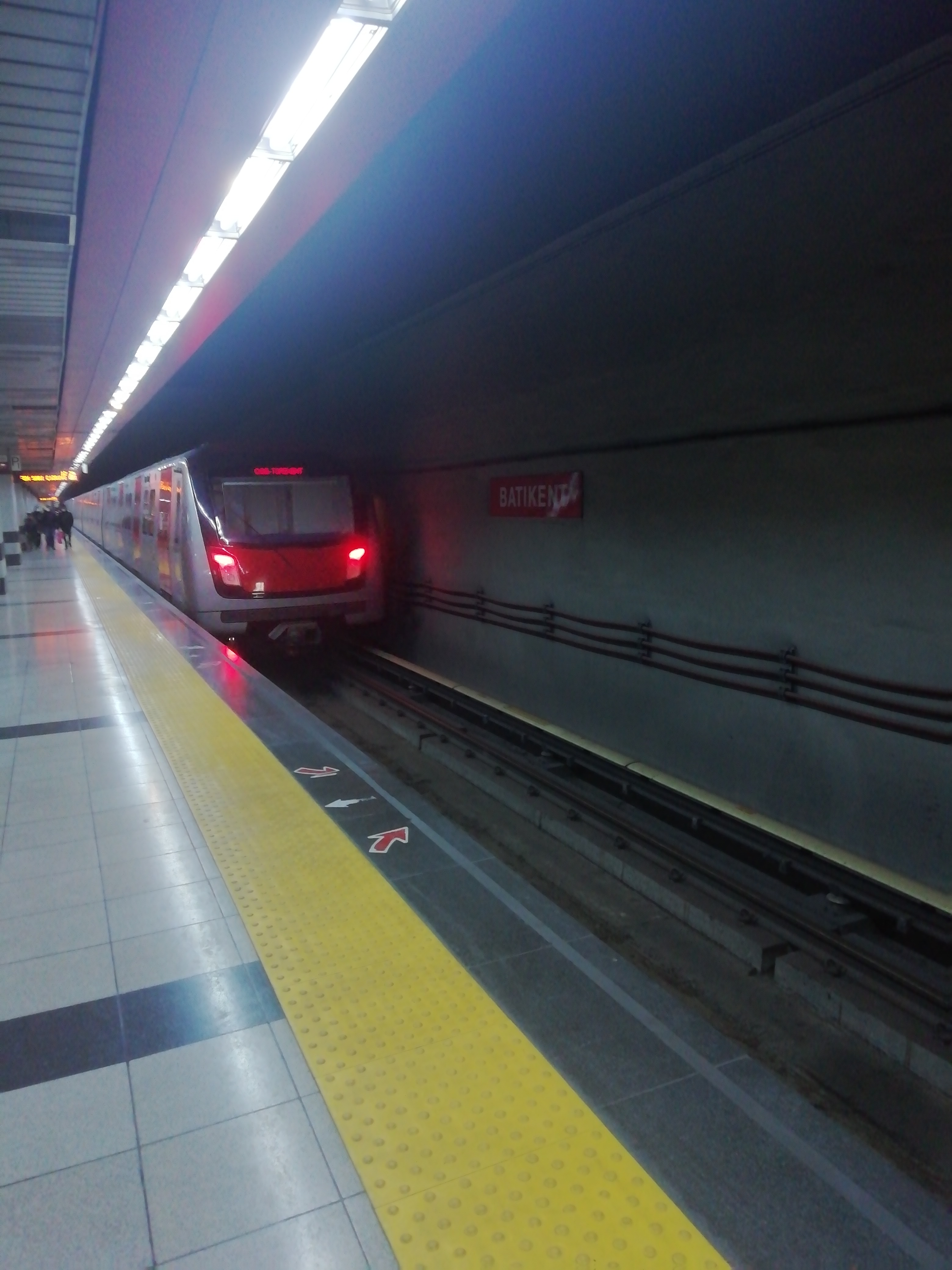
A train at Batıkent station (M1/M3)

Station	Status	Connections	Notes
Batıkent	in service	M1 (Ankara Metro)	
Batı Merkez	in service		
Mesa	in service		
Botanik	in service		
İstanbul Yolu	in service		
Eryaman 1-2	in service		
Eryaman 5	in service		
Devlet Mahallesi/1910 Ankaragücü	in service		formerly known as Devlet Mahallesi
Harikalar Diyarı	in service		
Fatih	in service		
Gaziosmanpaşa (GOP)	in service		
OSB-Törekent	in service		

==== M4 ====
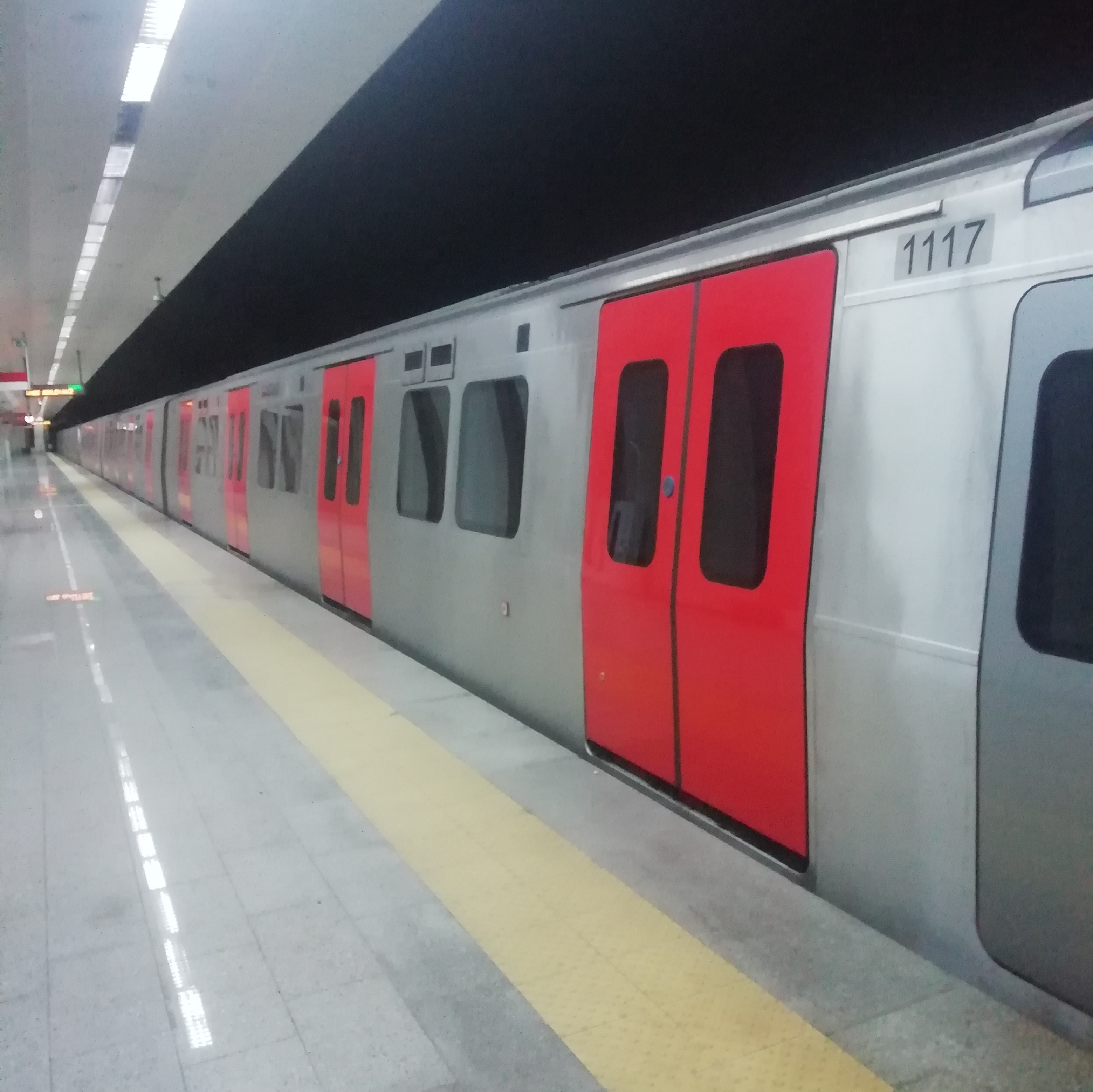
A train at Şehitler station (M4)

Station	Status	Connections	Notes
15 Temmuz Kızılay Millî İrade	in service	,, Ankaray, AnkaraAir (airport shuttle), 442 airport bus	formerly known as Kızılay
Adliye	in service		
Gar	in service	Ankaray, TCDD Başkentray (suburban rail), mainline, regional and high speed trains, AnkaraAir (airport shuttle), 442 airport bus	
Atatürk Kültür Merkezi (AKM)	in service	, AnkaraAir (airport shuttle), metrobus (future)	
Ankara Su ve Kanalizasyon İdaresi (ASKİ)	in service		
Dışkapı	in service	442 airport bus	
Meteoroloji	in service	Keçiören cable car	
Belediye	in service		
Mecidiye	in service		
Kuyubaşı	in service		
Dutluk	in service		
Şehitler	in service		formerly known as Gazino

== Rolling stock ==
=== Ankaray ===
Ankaray vehicles on the Ankaray line are Siemens-Adtranz-Ansaldobreda, S.P.A. (AnsaldoBreda) M1, M2, and M3 trains, which have a top speed of 80 km/h (50 mph) (operational speed: 38 km/h (24 mph)), and are equipped with regenerative braking.

The system is served by 11 trainsets. Each trainset comprises 3 sets of 2 cars paired together. Each pair of cars is 29-metre (95 ft) long, with 60 seats, and can transport a maximum of 308 passengers; thus each trainset is approximately 90-metre (300 ft) long and can transport 925 passengers per train. The current passenger volume capacity on the Ankaray line is 27,000 passengers per hour per direction (PPHPD).

=== Ankara Metro ===
The original vehicles used on the M1 line are Bombardier Transportation-built modified versions of the sixth-generation H-series trains used on the Toronto subway. The Toronto trains on which they were based on were built in 1986 by the Urban Transportation Development Corporation (UTDC), a company later purchased by Bombardier. There are a total of 108 of these cars, which are usually configured as 18 six-car trainsets. The car's seats are made of rigid plastic, and are all arranged longitudinally. There are no forward- or rear-facing seats, and no seats at the front or rear of each car. All Bombardier-built cars were retired in 2019, following the merger of lines M1, M2, and M3. They still work on special days.

In 2012, a large order of 342 subway cars from CRRC Zhuzhou was placed to supplement the fleet on line M1 and for use on the newer M2, M3 and M4 lines. The trains are three-car multiple units, of which two are coupled to make a total of 54 six-car trainsets. The first trains entered service together with the opening of Line M3 in February 2014.

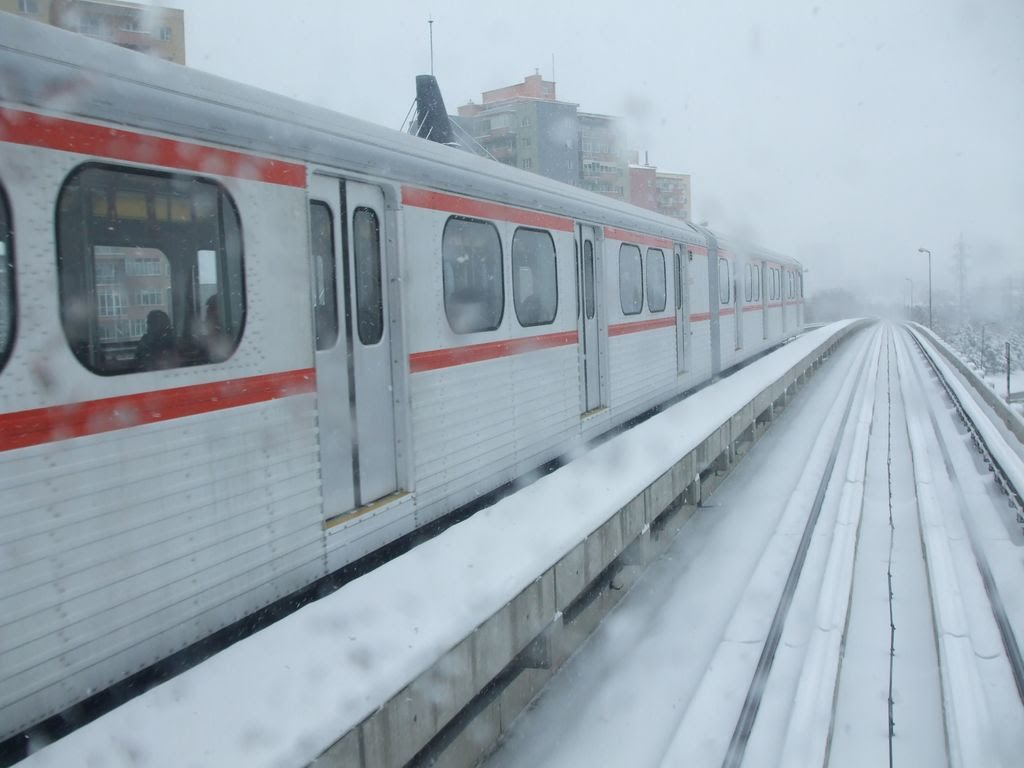
A set of Bombardier cars on line M1, 2013

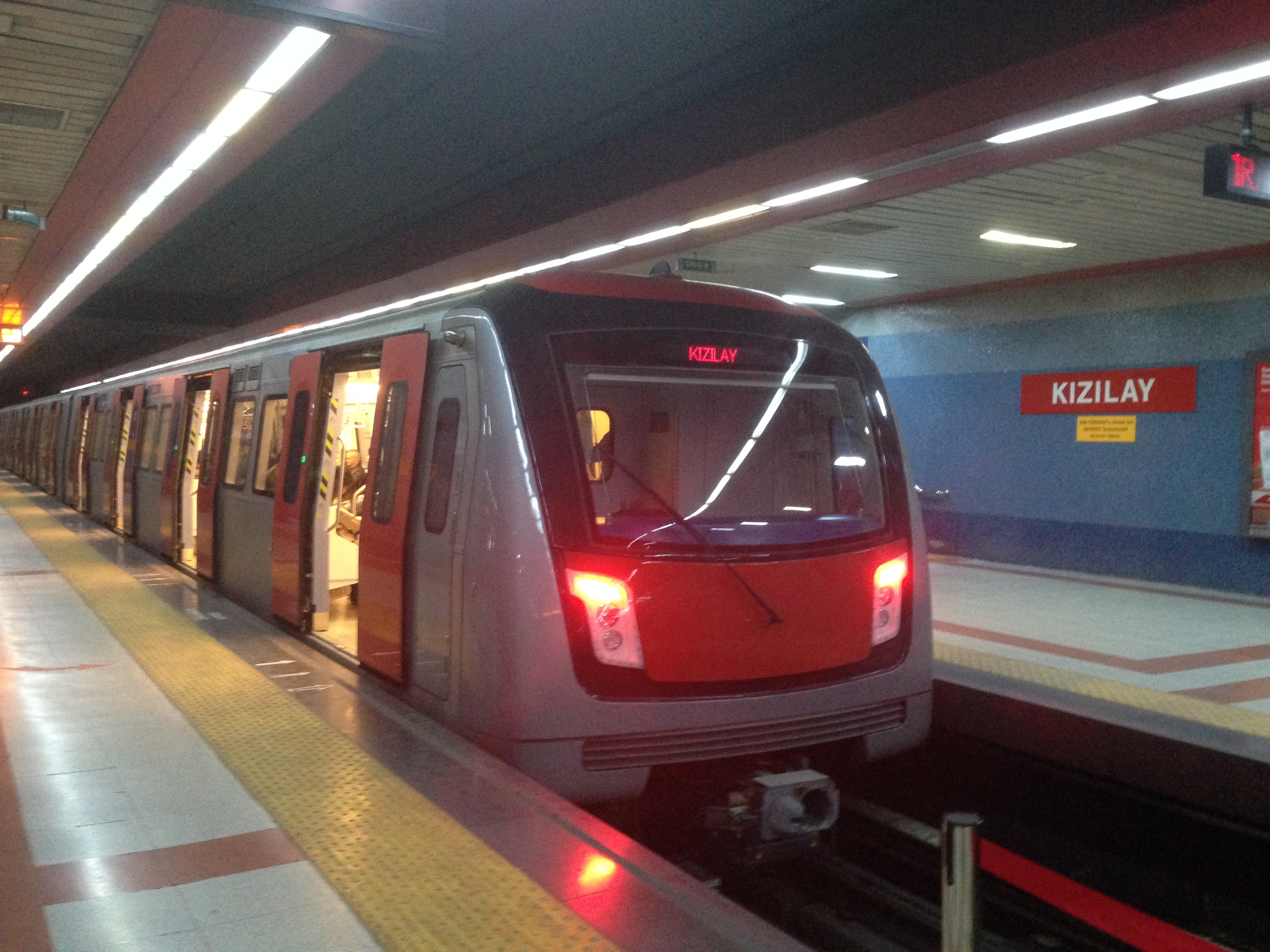
A train of CRRC cars at Kızılay station, 2014

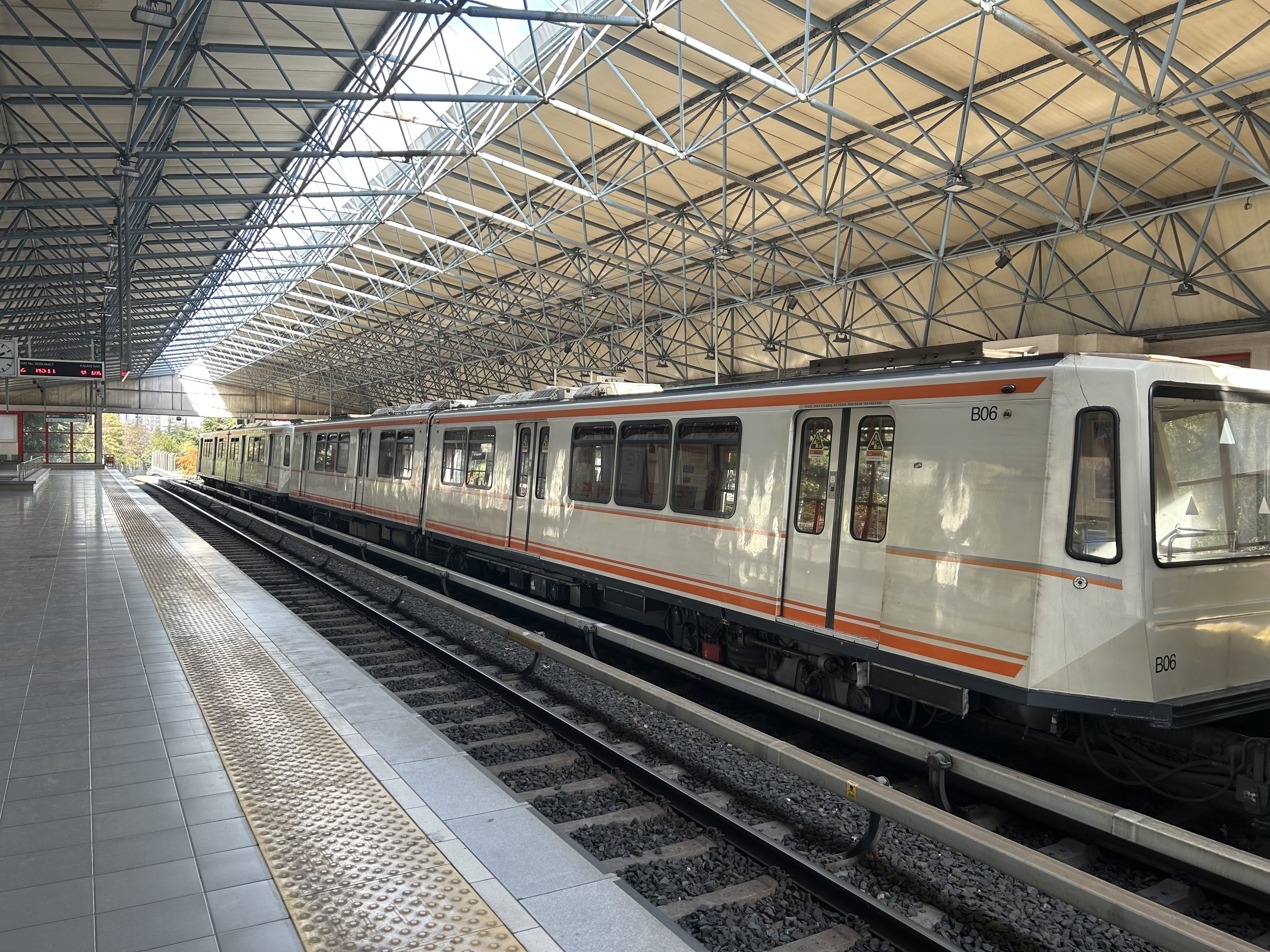
An Ankaray train of AnsaldoBreda cars at Emek station, 2024

== Signalling system ==
Both the Ankara Metro and the Ankaray depend on Communications-based Train Control signalling systems. On the Ankaray, signals only show whenever there is a train or if a blockage exists or not. However, on the Ankara Metro, signals are only activated by automatic control by specific rules.

Unlike other metro systems, the Ankara Metro does not use green signal on normal operations. Only one fixed chunk in front of the train will become available, which results in yellow signals at normal operation even more than one chunk is available. The strict rule of flashing (or blinking) yellow signal depends on these two conditions that must be met at the same time: The Metro arriving at the station or present at the station must be in standard operation mode and at least one chunk towards to forward direction must be free. Also, flashing yellow signals are only emitted on forward signals, preventing reverse direction movement in normal operation mode. If one of these conditions are not met (except Operation Mode), the signal will emit red light. While train will out of standard operation mode, the signals will return normal Communitacions-based Train Control rules or manual signal control. For green and yellow signals, there are 2 different variants: flashing or static. Flashing signals means either automatic controlled route or manually set route in effect, while static signals are manually controlled or emitted from the control center.

The Ankaray also uses red, yellow, and green signals. Red and green signals used for indicating is the chunk occupied or not. Unlike the Ankara metro, the yellow signal turns on when a rail change is going to be made.

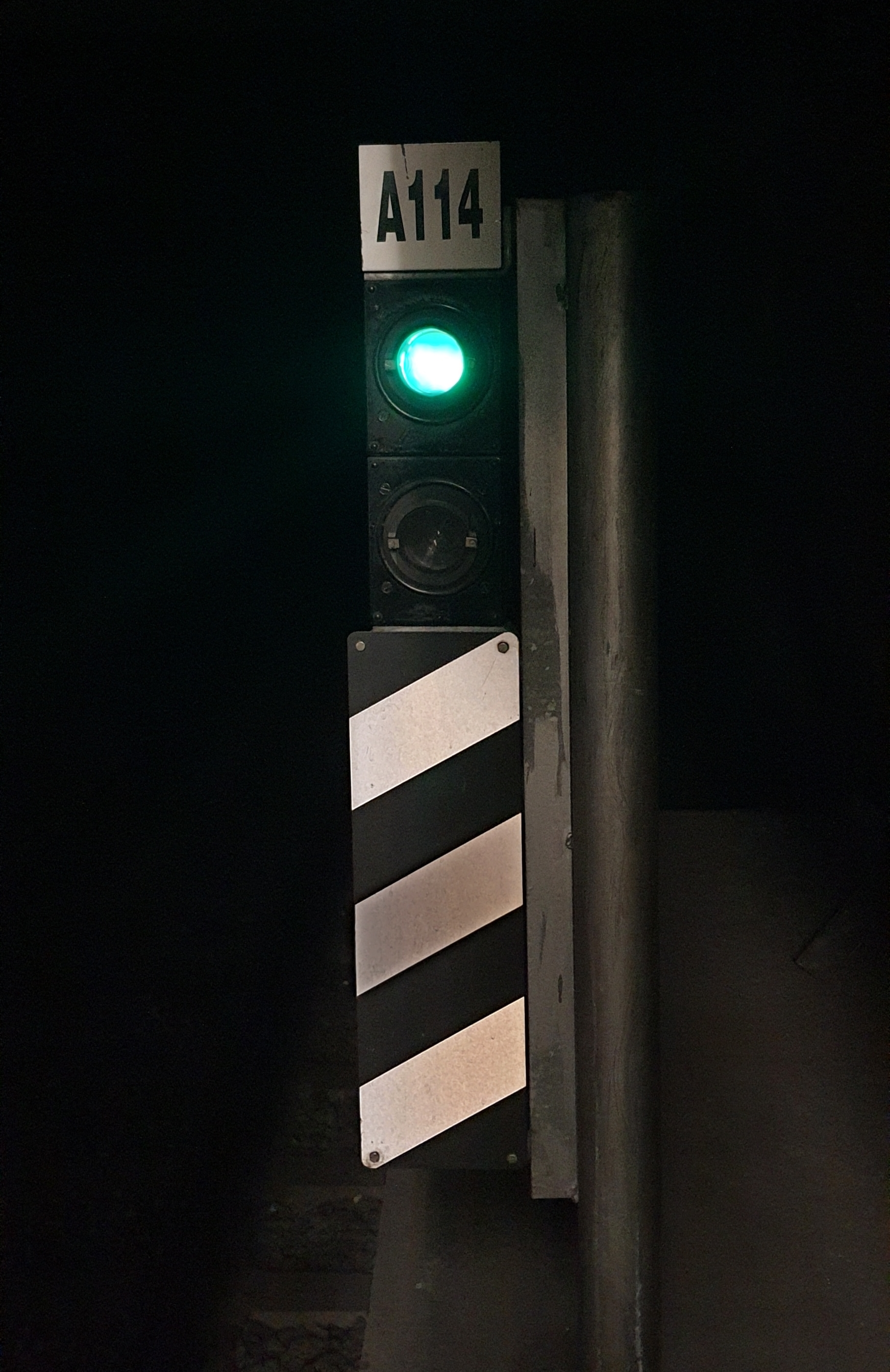
A green Ankaray signal located at Kolej station

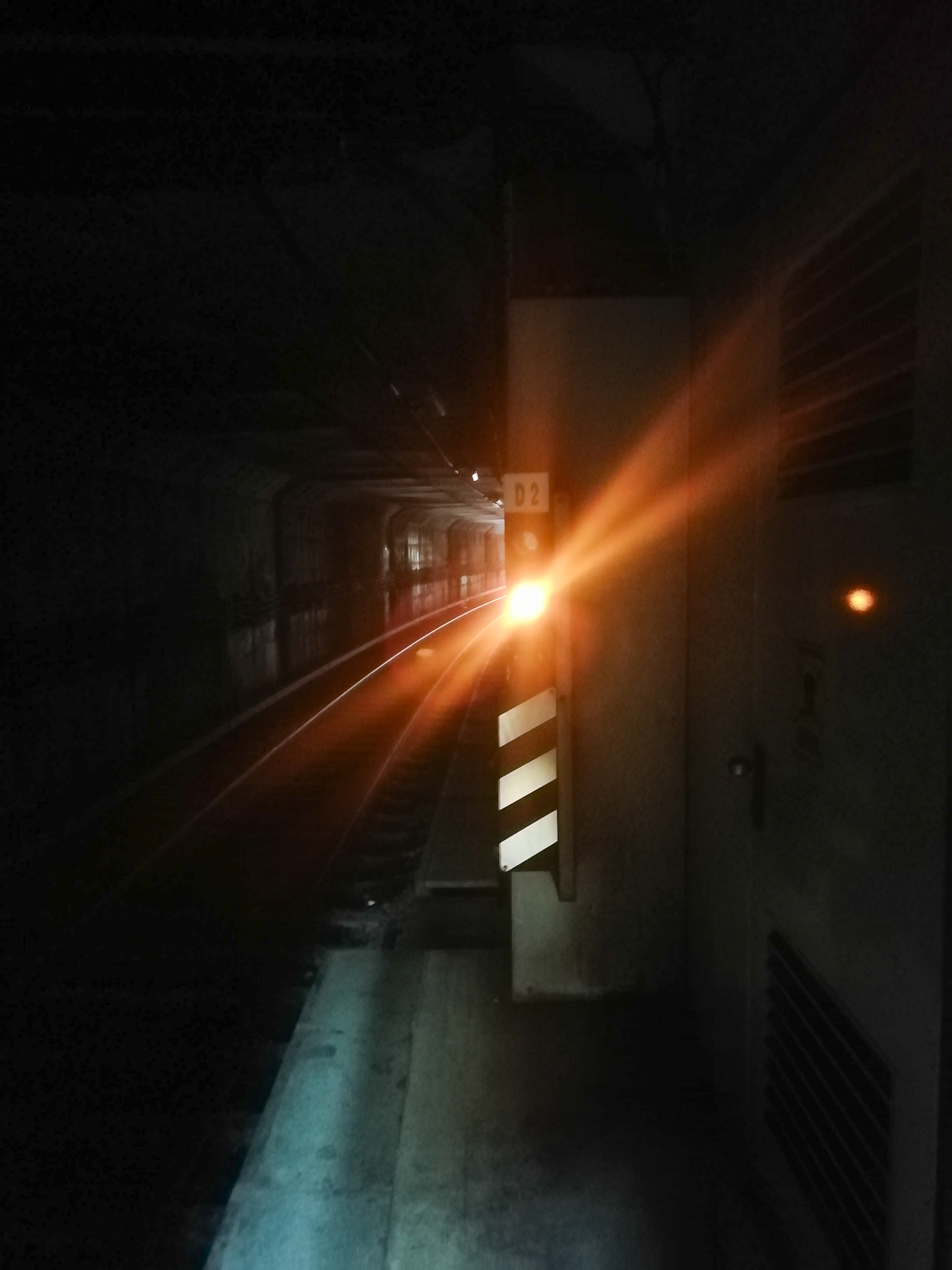
A yellow Ankaray signal located at AŞTİ station

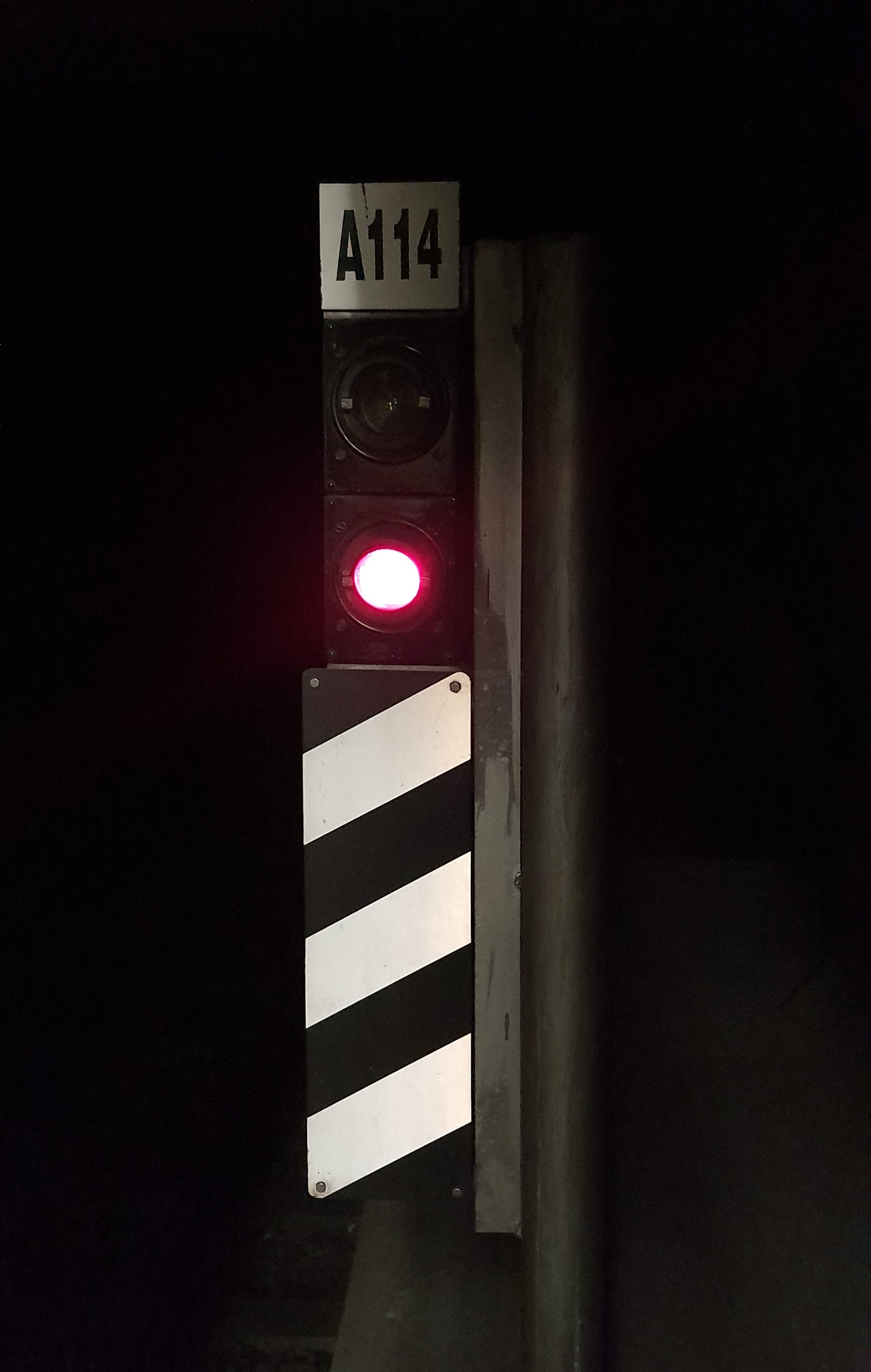
A red Ankaray signal located at Kolej station

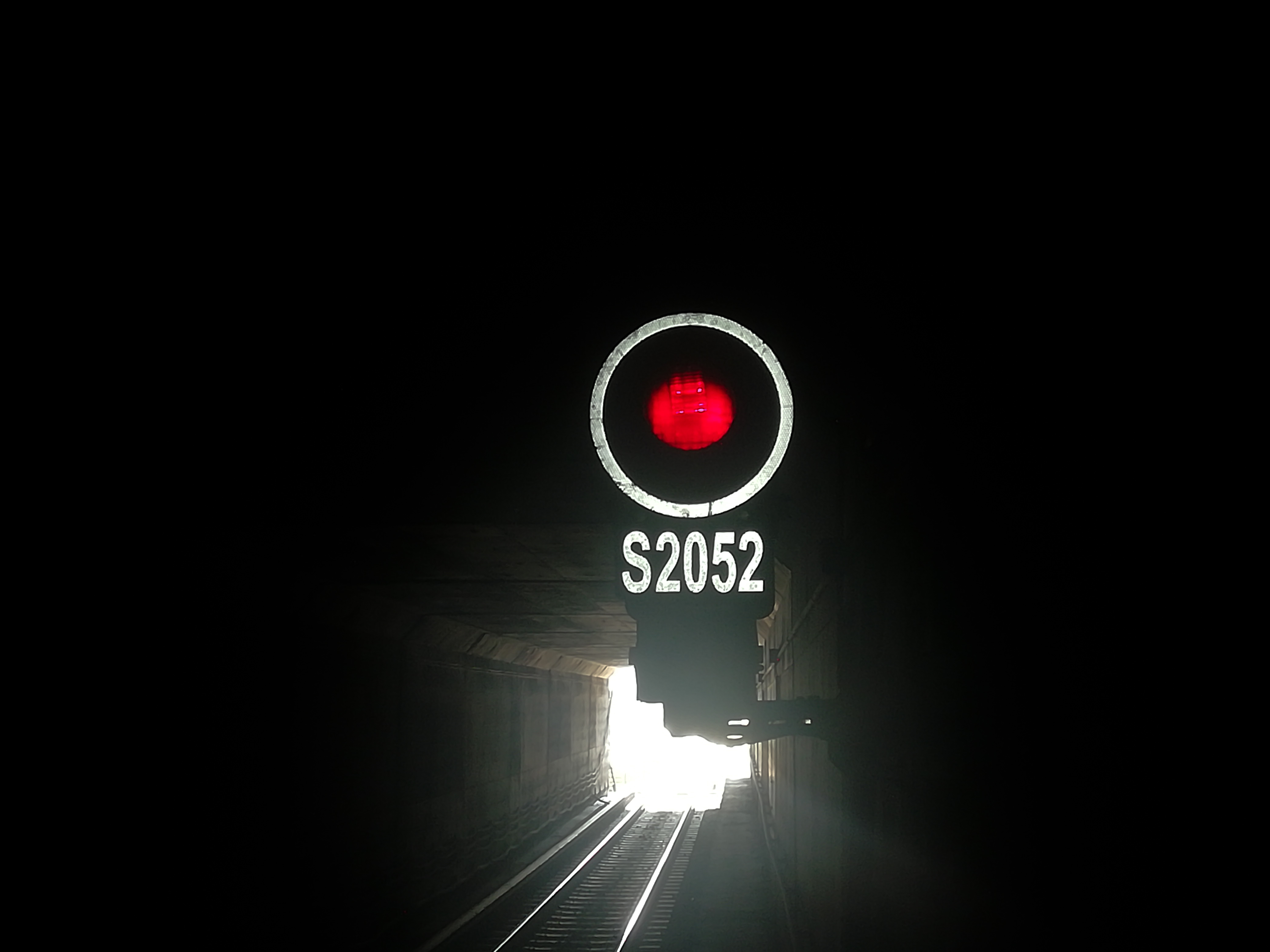
A red Metro signal located at Akköprü station

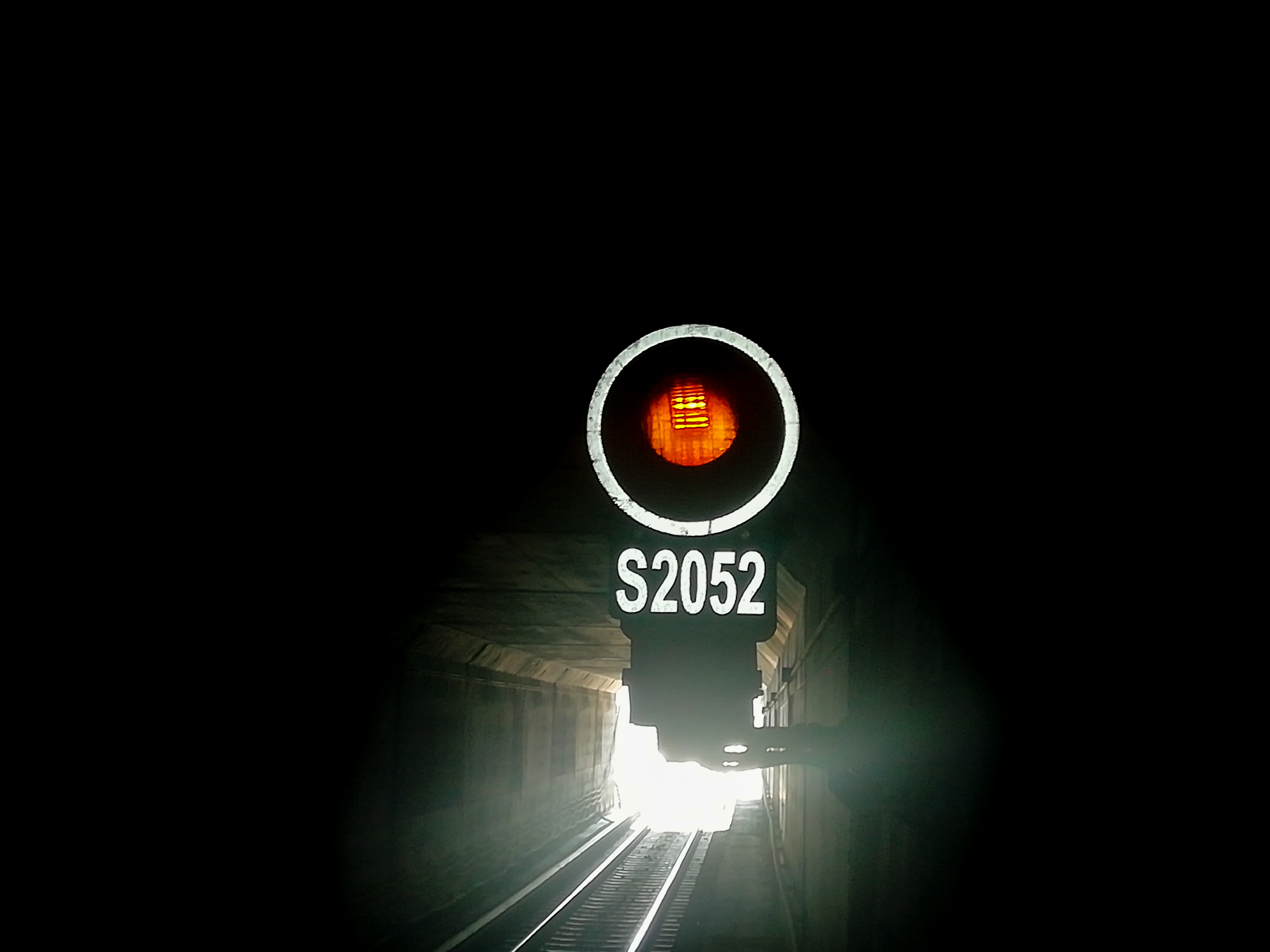
A flashing yellow Metro signal located at Akköprü station, indicating that a train is approaching the station or a train is in the station and the sector is clear until the next station. This signal also indicates the train is in normal operation.

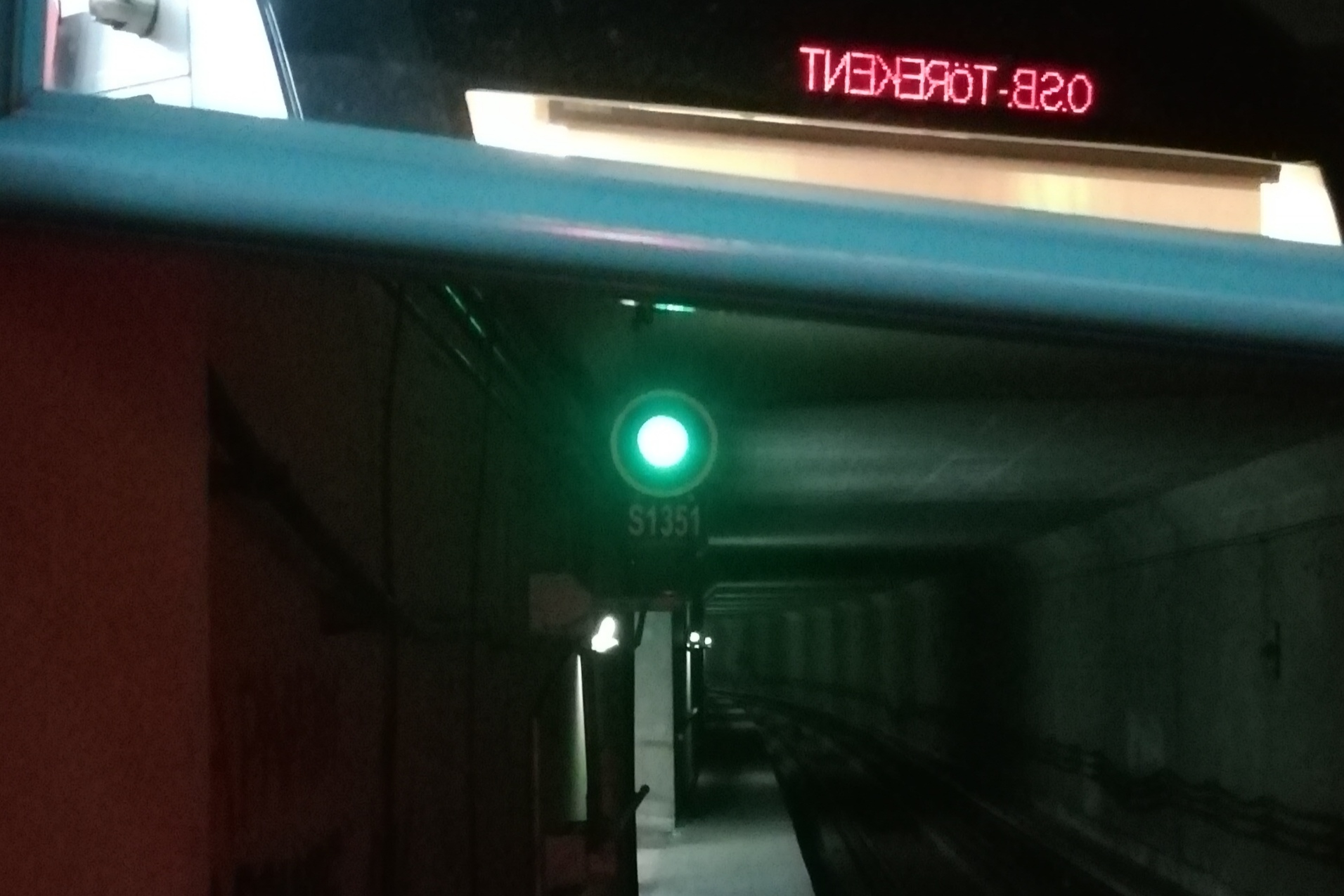
A static green Metro signal located at Batıkent station, indicating the train is out of normal operation and the signal is being emitted manually by the control center.

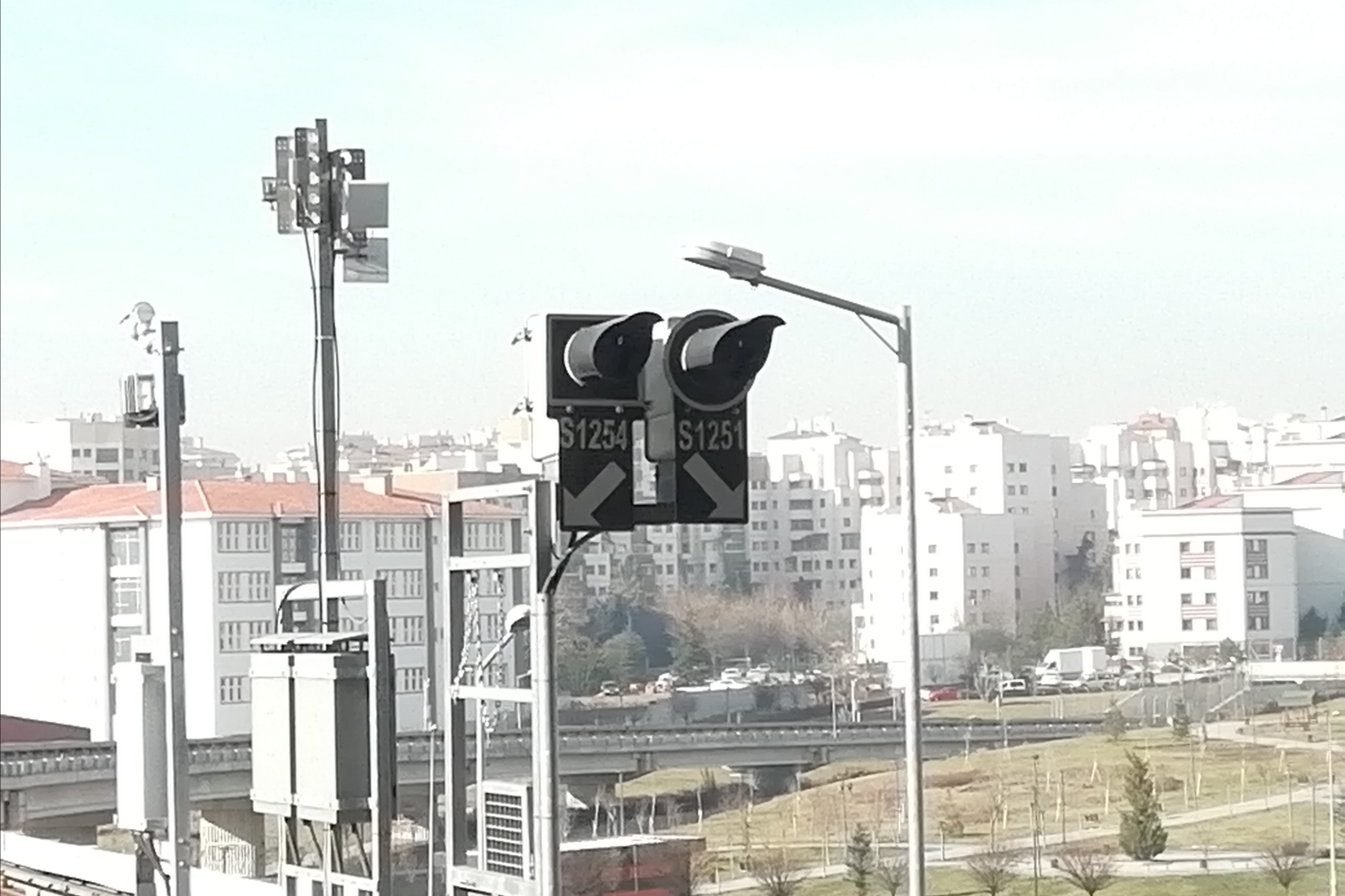
The signals also show directions. A circular signal indicates forward direction, while a square signal indicates backward direction

== Future service ==
Construction of the following metro lines are under construction or planned:

Line	Route	Length	Stations	Status
Ankaray	AŞTİ ↔ Söğütözü	0.78 km (0.48 mi)	1	Not open due to signalling issues. Planned to open after the signaling system on the rest of the line is renewed.
Ankaray	Dikimevi ↔ Natoyolu	7.4 km (4.6 mi)	8	Under construction
TOTAL:		8.18 km (5.08 mi)	9	

== See also ==
- Başkentray, a commuter rail system operating in the Ankara area
