= Dikimevi (Ankara Metro) =

Rail station

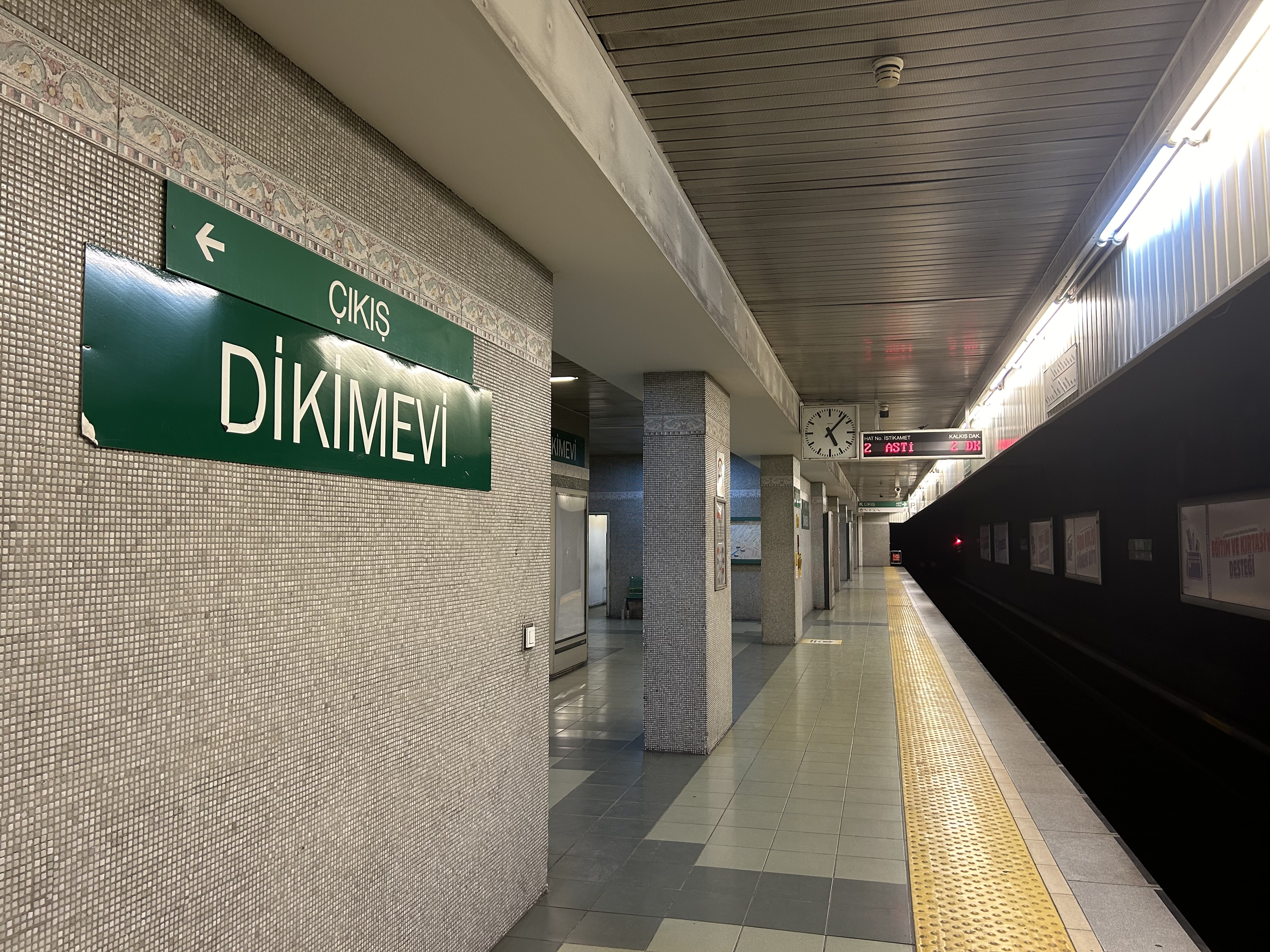

General information
- Location: Cemal Gürsel Cd., Cebeci Mah., 06590; Çankaya
- Coordinates: 39.9323°N 32.8775°E
- System: Ankara Metro rapid transit station
- Owner: Ankara Metropolitan Municipality
- Operator: EGO
- Line: Ankaray
- Platforms: 2 island platforms
- Tracks: 2
- Connections: EGO Bus: 220-3, 221-3, 297-3, 321, 321-6, 324, 326, 329, 330, 334, 334-6, 339-3, 340, 341, 341-6, 343, 347, 347-6, 348, 350, 355, 355-4, 355-6, 357, 361, 365, 367, 377, 380, 380-6, 382, 383, 392, 392-6

Construction
- Structure type: Underground
- Depth: 11 m (36 ft)
- Parking: no
- Cycle facilities: ues
- Accessible: Yes

History
- Opened: 30 August 1996
- Electrified: 750V DC Third Rail

Services
Preceding station	Ankara Metro	Following station
Kurtuluş toward AŞTİ	A1	Terminus
Location

Dikimevi is an underground station and the eastern terminus of the Ankaray line of the Ankara Metro in Çankaya. It is located under Cemal Gürsel Avenue in Cebeci, three blocks south of Cebeci station. Dikimevi station consists of two side platforms and opened on 30 August 1996, together with the Ankaray line. The line was originally planned to be extended further east in Mamak, however these plans never took place.
