= AŞTİ (Ankara Metro) =

Metro station in Çankaya, Turkey

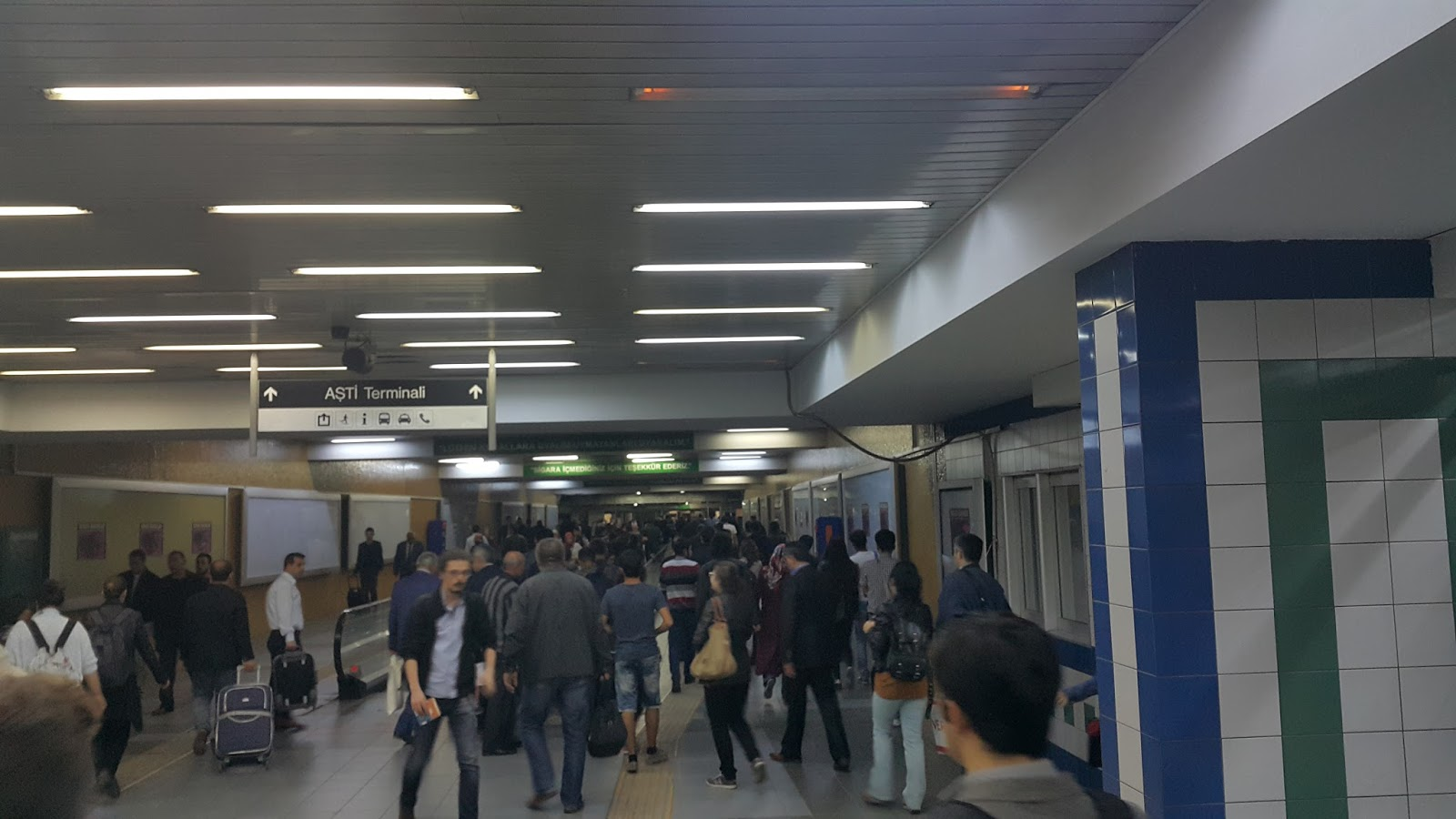

General information
- Location: Mevlana Blv., Emek Mah., 06490; Çankaya
- Coordinates: 39.9181°N 32.8143°E
- System: Ankara Metro rapid transit station
- Owner: Ankara Metropolitan Municipality
- Operator: EGO
- Line: Ankaray
- Platforms: 2 side platforms
- Tracks: 2
- Connections: EGO Bus: 102-2, 104-1, 106-1, 107-6, 109, 157-3, 178-3, 419, 445-2, 484-2

Construction
- Structure type: Underground
- Parking: yes
- Cycle facilities: yes
- Accessible: Yes

History
- Opened: 30 August 1996
- Electrified: 750V DC Third Rail

Services
Preceding station	Ankara Metro	Following station
Terminus	A1	Emek toward Dikimevi
Location

AŞTİ is an underground station and the western terminus of the Ankaray line of the Ankara Metro in Çankaya. It is located on the east side of Mevlana Boulevard, across from the Ankara Intercity Bus Terminal (AŞTİ). AŞTİ station consists of two side platforms and opened on 30 August 1996, together with the Ankaray line. Connection to the bus terminal is available via a passageway underneath Mevlana Boulevard.

Tracks continue south of the station to the Söğütözü Maintenance Facility and further to Söğütözü station, which was completed in 2014 but without Ankaray service.
