= 15 Temmuz Kızılay Milli İrade (Ankara Metro) =

Underground station of Ankara Metro in Turkey

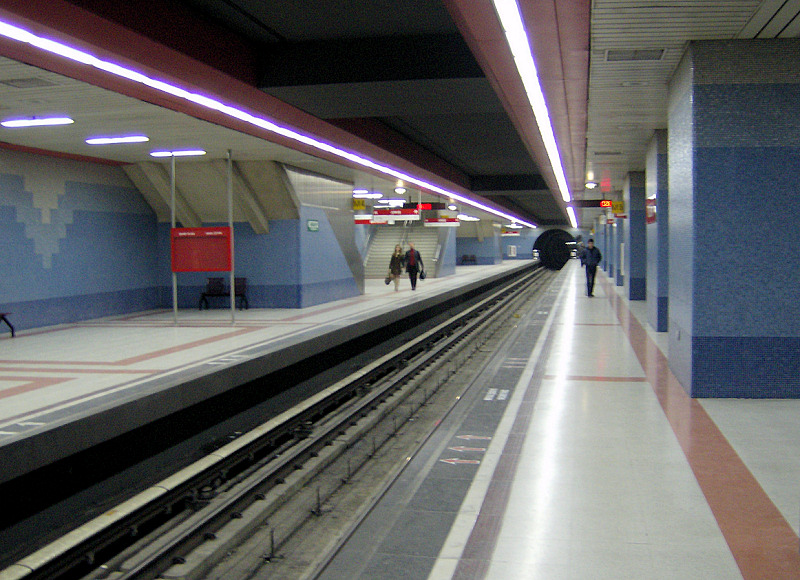
- The M1/M2 platform.

General information
- Location: 15 Temmuz Kızılay Millî İrade Meydanı, Kızılay Mah. 06420; Çankaya
- Coordinates: 39.9208°N 32.8540°E
- System: Ankara Metro rapid transit station
- Owner: Ankara Metropolitan Municipality
- Operator: EGO
- Lines: M1; M2; M4; Ankaray
- Platforms: 2 side platforms and 1 island platform (M1/M2); 2 side platforms (Ankaray)
- Tracks: 2 (M1/M2); 2 (Ankaray)
- Connections: EGO Bus: 135-2, 173-2, 173-5, 185-2, 185-3, 185-6, 220-3, 221-3, 297-3, 330, 330-2, 340, 340-2, 341

Construction
- Structure type: Underground
- Platform levels: 2
- Accessible: Yes

History
- Opened: 30 August 1996 (Ankaray); 29 December 1997 (M1/M2 platform); 12 April 2023 (M4 platform)
- Electrified: 750V DC Third Rail

Services
Preceding station	Ankara Metro	Following station
Sıhhiye toward Batıkent	M1	through to M2
Necatibey toward Koru	M2	through to M1
Terminus	M4	Adliye toward Şehitler-Gazino
Demirtepe toward AŞTİ	A1	Kolej toward Dikimevi
Location

15 Temmuz Kızılay Millî İrade, formerly known and still commonly referred to as just Kızılay, is an underground station and a hub of the Ankara Metro. A total of four lines meet at Kızılay; Ankaray, the M1, the M2, and the M4. The station was first opened on 30 August 1996 with the Ankaray platform, while the M1 platform was opened on 29 December 1997.

Kızılay station is largest rapid transit complex on the Ankara Metro system.

== History ==
While the Ankara Metro system was planned in the early 1990s, Kızılay station was chosen to be the transfer station between the original two lines. The station was first opened on 30 August 1996 as part of the 11-station Ankaray line, which is the second-oldest rapid transit line in Turkey. 16 months later, the M1 platform was opened on 29 December 1997. Kızılay remained the only hub and transfer station on the Ankara Metro until 12 February 2014, when the M3 line entered service from Batıkent. A month later, on 13 March, the M2 line from Kızılay to Koru entered service, making Kızılay one of two metro stations in Turkey serving more than two lines, along with Yenikapı Transfer Center in Istanbul. Following the failed 2016 coup d'état, the station, along with the square, was renamed 15 Temmuz Kızılay Millî İrade.
