= OSB-Törekent (Ankara Metro) =

Underground station of Ankara Metro in Turkey

OSB-TÖREKENT

General information
- Location: Ahmet Andiçen Cd., Törekent Mah., 06949; Sincan
- Coordinates: 39.9876°N 32.5589°E
- System: Ankara Metro rapid transit station
- Owner: Ankara Metropolitan Municipality
- Operator: EGO
- Line: M3
- Platforms: 1 island platform
- Connections: EGO Bus: 507-2, 525-2, 525-6, 572

Construction
- Structure type: Underground
- Parking: Yes
- Accessible: Yes

History
- Opened: 12 February 2014
- Electrified: 750V DC Third Rail

Services
Preceding station	Ankara Metro	Following station
Terminus	M3	GOP toward Batıkent
Location

OSB-Törekent is an underground rapid transit station and the western terminus of the M3 line of the Ankara Metro. It is also the northwest terminus of the 46.6 km (29.0 mi) long continuous metro line, consisting of the M1, M2 and M3 lines. The station is located along Ahmet Andiçen Avenue and was opened on 12 February 2014.
