= Batıkent, Yenimahalle =

City in Turkey

Coordinates: 39°57′N 32°44′E

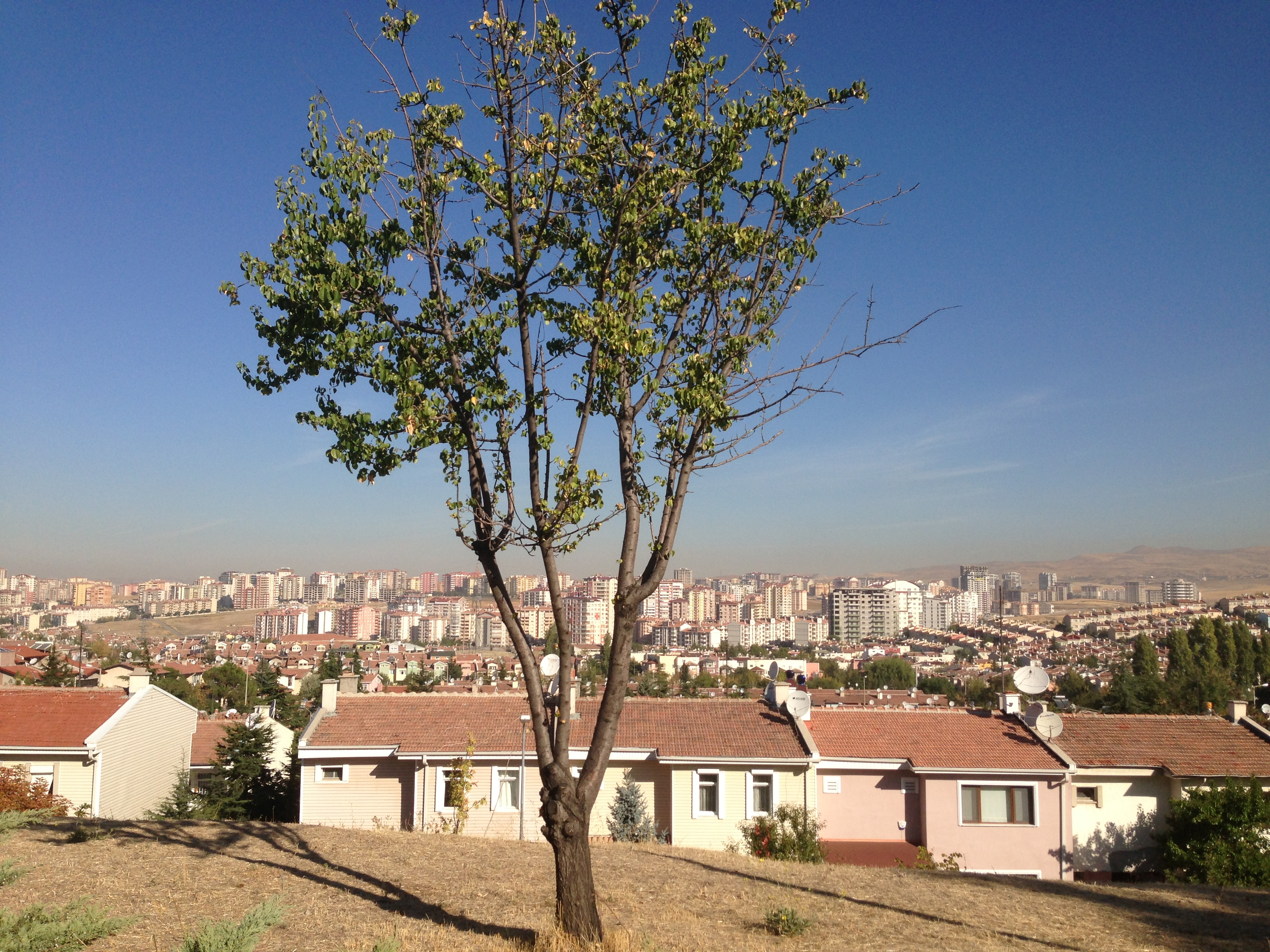

Batıkent (transl. West City) is a city near Ankara, Turkey. It is a suburban residential area located 16 kilometres (9.9 mi) west of the city, and Ankara's largest suburb. The population is approximately 200,000, mainly middle-class families; it is a popular residential area for students and government workers. The dominant dwelling types are semi-detached and detached houses, and apartment buildings.

Batıkent was created as a cooperative housing project by Kent-Koop (Union of Batikent Housing Construction Cooperatives) to improve the quality of life for low and middle income people, mostly civil servants, traders, etc. The 1995 estimated cost of this project was approximately 43 billion dollars.

Batikent was the first mass housing project to demonstrate the success of public and private partnerships in the housing field in Turkey. It was a pioneer in bringing low income people together in cooperatives, either by place of work or through the workers' unions, to decide for themselves about the type, size and number of units in their housing projects. Housing "by the people and for the people" has affected the housing shortage in Turkey and has depressed the sale and rental prices in the Ankara housing market.
