= Batıkent (Ankara Metro) =

Underground station of Ankara Metro in Turkey

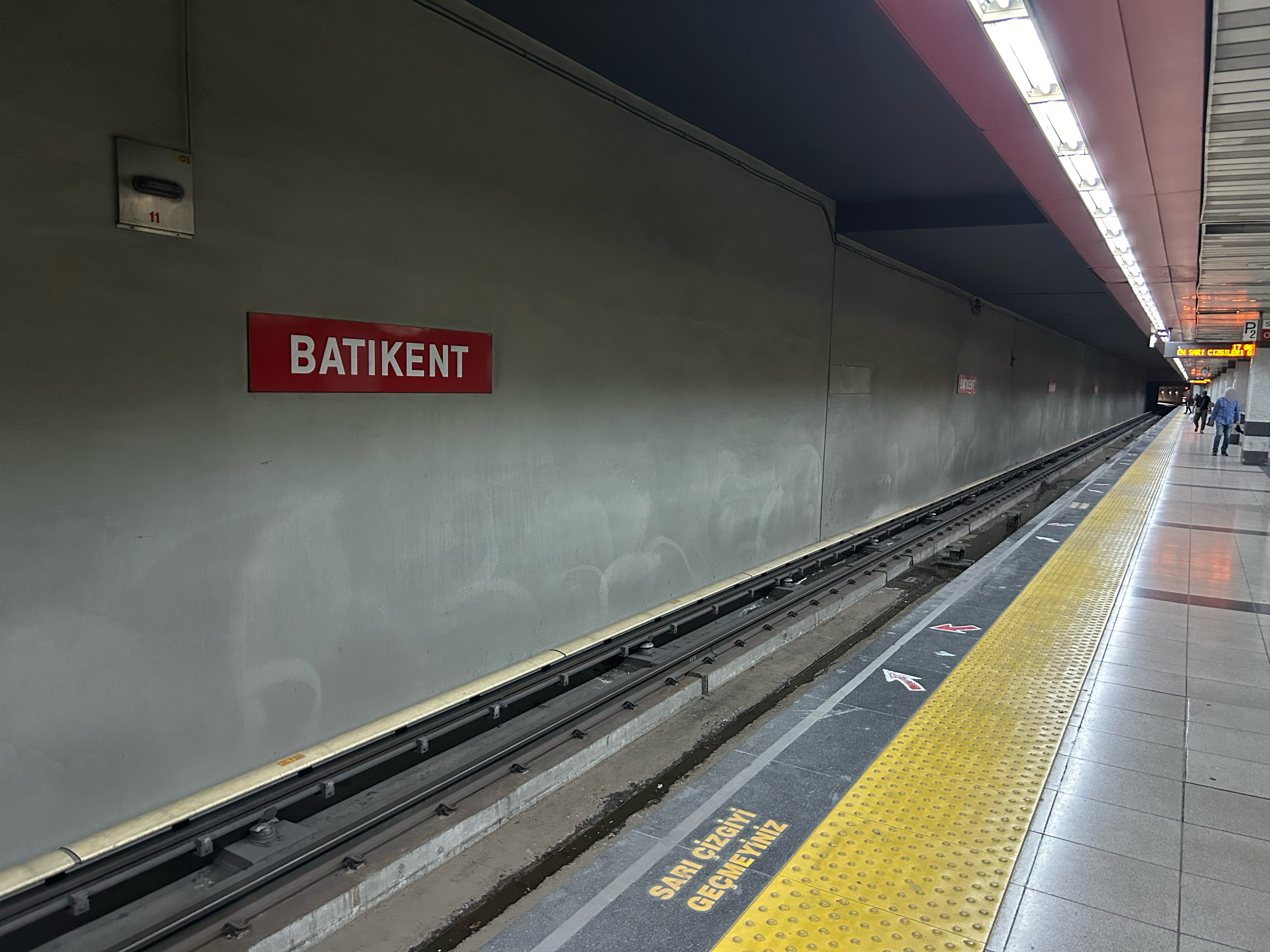

General information
- Location: Başkent Blv., Kentkoop Mah. 06370; Yenimahalle
- Coordinates: 39.9679°N 32.7270°E
- System: Ankara Metro rapid transit station
- Owner: Ankara Metropolitan Municipality
- Operator: EGO
- Lines: M1; M3
- Platforms: 2 side platforms
- Connections: EGO Bus: 201-6, 240, 276, 287, 292, 294, 295, 297-3, 298, 299

Construction
- Structure type: Underground
- Accessible: Yes

History
- Opened: 29 December 1997
- Electrified: 750V DC Third Rail

Services
| Preceding station | Ankara Metro | Following station |
|---|---|---|
| through to M3 | M1 | Ostim toward Kızılay |
| Batımerkez toward OSB-Törekent | M3 | through to M1 |
Location

Batıkent is an underground rapid transit station of the Ankara Metro. It is located along Başkent Avenue at the intersection with 1777th Avenue. The station was originally opened as the western terminus of the M1 line on 29 December 1997. On 13 February 2014, it became the eastern terminus of the M3 line. Both lines use the same platform as the M3 is an extension of the M1.
