= Özgüneş railway station =

Railway station in Ankara, Turkey

ÖZGÜNEŞ
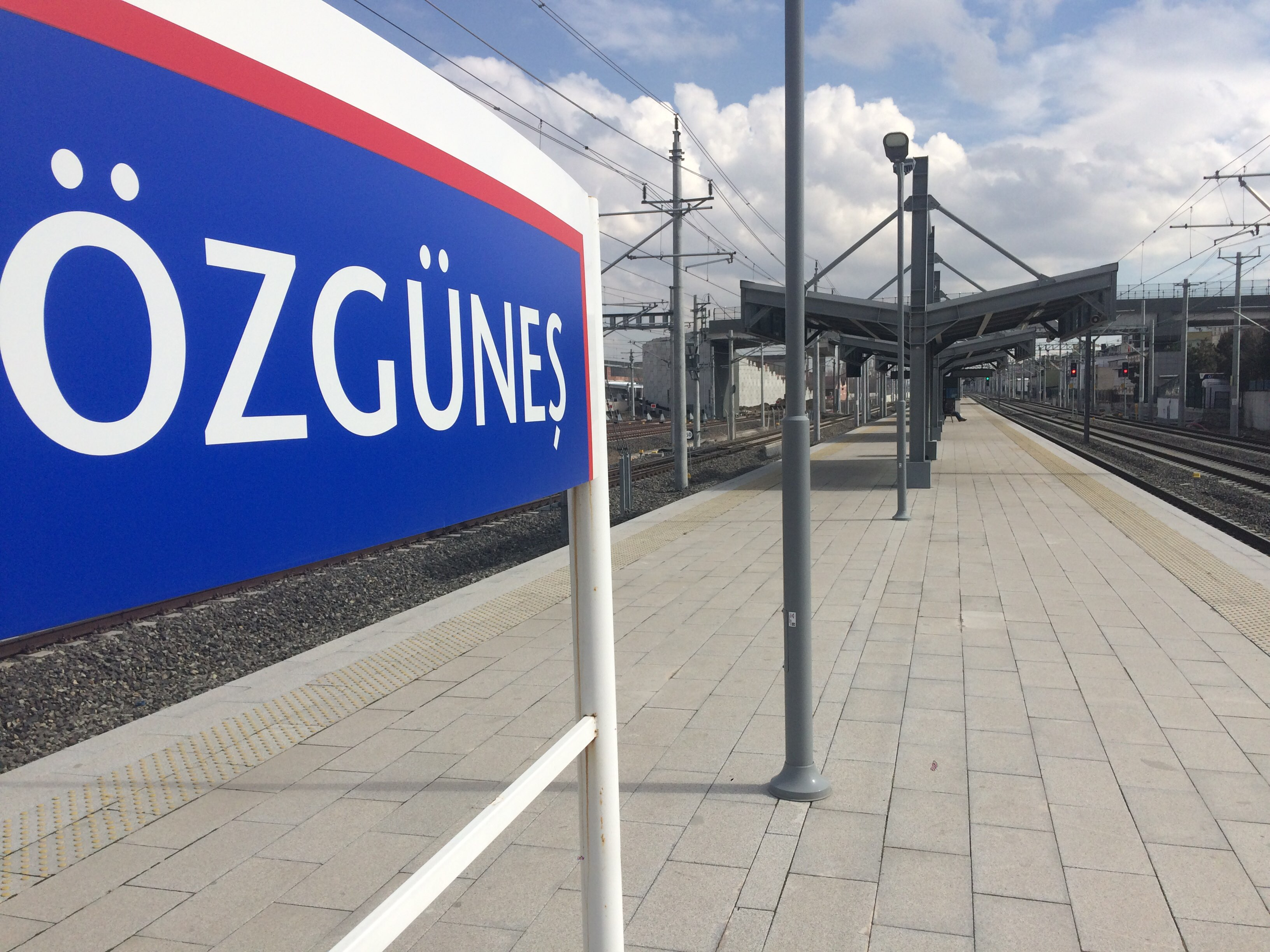

General information
- Location: İstasyon Cd., Süvari Mah. 06794; Etimesgut, Ankara; Turkey
- Coordinates: 39.9518°N 32.6488°E
- System: TCDD Taşımacılık commuter rail station
- Owner: Turkish State Railways
- Operator: TCDD Taşımacılık
- Line: Başkentray
- Platforms: 1 island platform
- Tracks: 5

Construction
- Parking: No
- Cycle facilities: No
- Accessible: Yes

History
- Opened: 1972
- Closed: 2016-18
- Rebuilt: 2017-18

Services
Preceding station	TCDD Taşımacılık	Following station
Eryaman towards Sincan	Başkentray	Etimesgut towards Kayaş
Track layout
Location

Özgüneş railway station (Turkish: Özgüneş istasyonu) is a railway station in Ankara, Turkey, currently being rebuilt. The station was a stop on the Ankara suburban from 1972 to 2016 when it was closed and demolished shortly after, in order to rebuild and expand the railway. Construction of the new station began in 2017 and is expected to open on 12 April 2018.

Özgüneş station was originally built in 1970 by the Turkish State Railways, when the railway from Ankara to Sincan was double-tracked. It entered service in 1972, when electric commuter service began on the line.

The new station consists of an island platform serving two tracks, within a five-track railway. South of the platform are two tracks for mainline and YHT high-speed trains, while the track north of the platform is a bi-directional track for freight trains and equipment moves.
