= Marşandiz Yard =

Rail yard in Ankara, Turkey

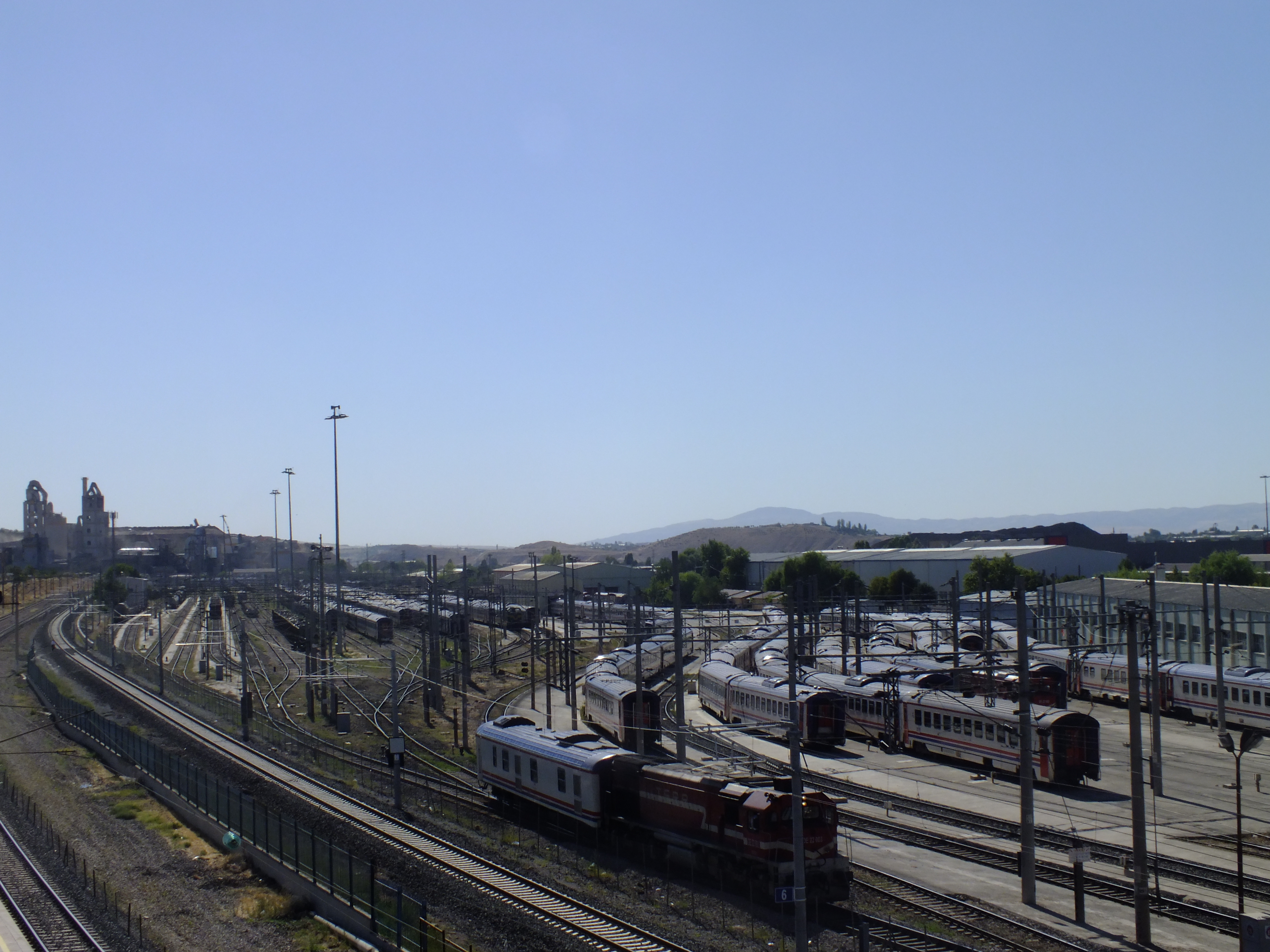
A view of Marşandiz Yard in 2013.

Marşandiz Yard (Turkish: Marşandiz deposu), also known as the Ankara Railway Factory (Turkish: Ankara Demiryolu Fabrikası), is a large mixed-use rail yard and maintenance facility in Ankara, Turkey. The sprawling complex consists of two rail yards, one for freight and one for passenger trains, a large maintenance facility consisting of locomotive and railcar maintenance and repair shops, freight warehouses and also houses the TCDD District 2 General Headquarters, along with other administrative facilities. The yard is the largest rail complex in Turkey, covering about 104 hectares (260 acres). Located in the industrial Bahçekapı neighborhood in Etimesgut, it is situated along the Istanbul-Ankara railway; Marşandiz station is served by Başkentray commuter trains.

Even though the entire facility is commonly referred to as the Ankara Railway Factory, only the large maintenance shops within the complex are part of the actual Ankara Railway Factory.

== Facilities ==
The complex houses several administrative and social facilities of the Turkish State Railways as well as the central Anatolia regional headquarters of the Turkish Customs and Trade Ministry. The administrations that are housed in the complex are the following:

- TCDD District 2 General Headquarters (Turkish: TCDD 2. Bölge Genel Müdürlüğü)
- Ankara Railway Factory Administration (Turkish: Ankara Demiryolu Fabrikası Genel Müdürlüğü)
  - Ankara Locomotive Maintenance Shops (Turkish: Ankara Loko Bakım Atölyesi)
- TCDD Railway Research and Technology Center, DATEM (Turkish: TCDD Demiryolu Araştırma ve Teknoloji Merkezi)
- Turkish Customs and Trade Ministry Regional Headquarters (Turkish: Orta Anadolu Gümrük ve Ticaret Bölge Müdürlüğü)
- Ankara Demirspor Social Facilities (Turkish: Ankara Demirspor Sosyal Tesisleri)
  - TCDD Ankara Demirspor Stadium

== History ==
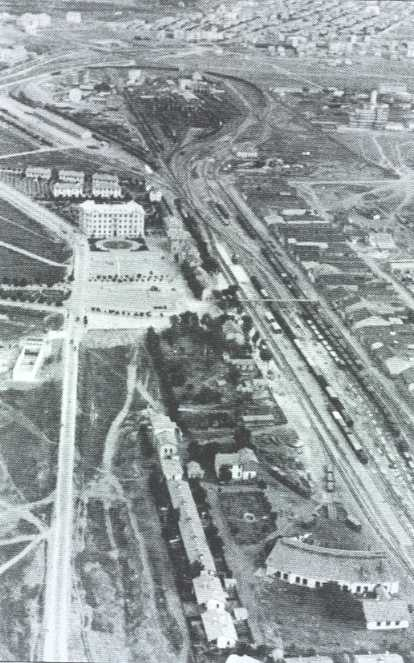
The railway yard in Ulus in the early 1930s, adjacent to Ankara station.

With the growth of Ankara in the 1930s and 1940s, space within the city center became more and more valuable. The construction of new government buildings also emphasized the need for more space. The Turkish State Railways (TCDD) owned a rail yard and train-shed next to Ankara station, which was centrally located in Ulus. With the need to expand their facilities, TCDD began constructing a large maintenance facility in Etimesgut. Marşandiz Yard opened in 1944 as the Ankara Railway Factory, thus decreasing the need for the train-sheds in Ulus.

Those sheds were demolished in the 1960s, as all railway maintenance was done at Marşandiz. In 1970, the railway from Sincan to Kayaş was expanded to two tracks in anticipation of electric commuter rail service between the two points. However, since passenger trains needed to travel 7 km (4.3 mi) to Ankara station for revenue service, the line between the two points became increasingly congested. So in 1977, the State Railways added a third track and in 1984 added a fourth, to relieve the congestion.

In 2003, TCDD founded the Railway Research and Technology Center, headquartered in the Marşandiz complex. Starting in 2007, high-speed YHT train-sets were stored and maintained in the facility until 2016, when a new railway yard and maintenance facility opened near Sincan, exclusively for YHT trains. In 2015, a new stadium opened for the State Railway owned football team, Ankara Demirspor.

== Gallery ==
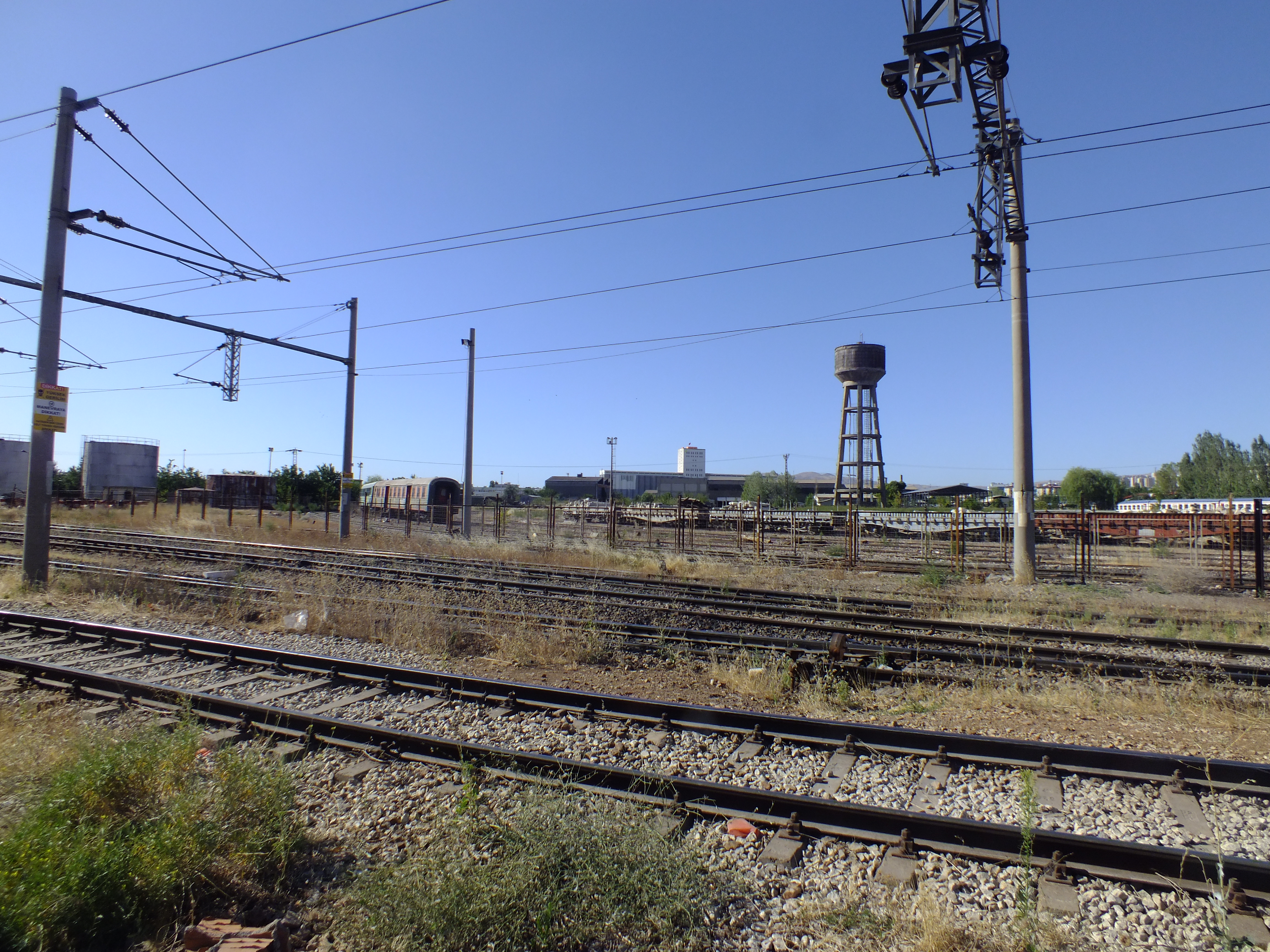
The freight warehouses.

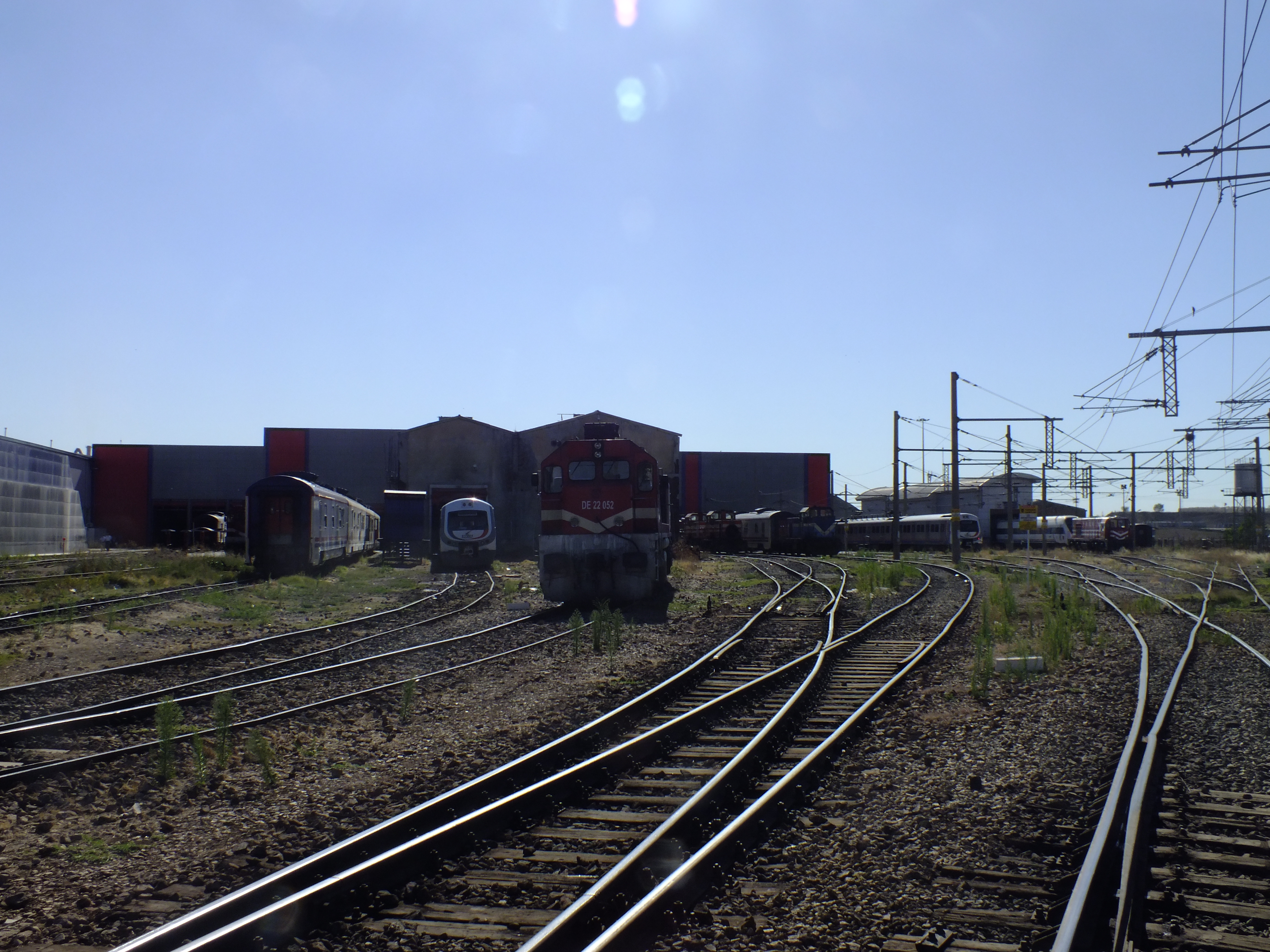
Trains at the Ankara Railway Factory.

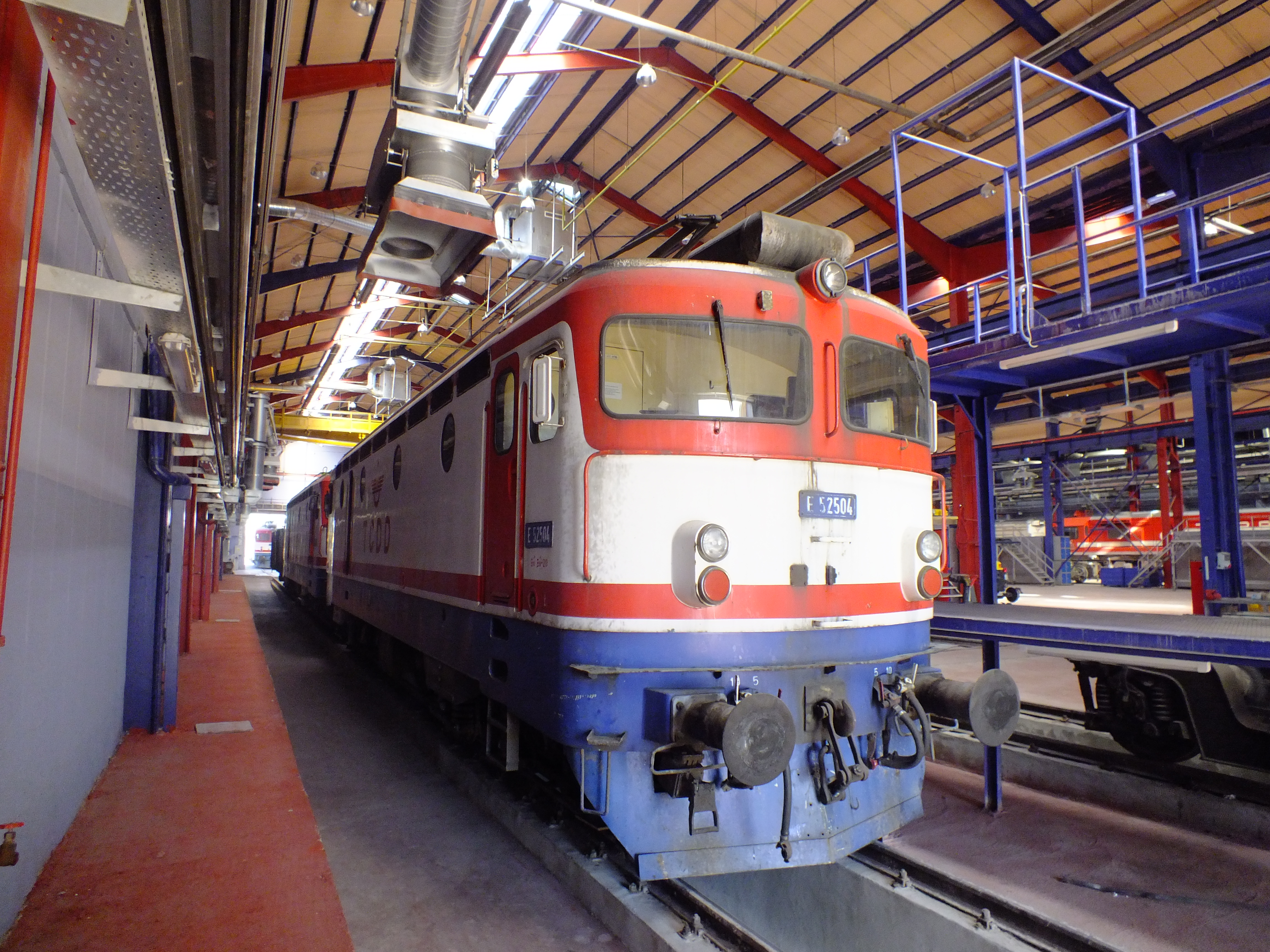
A retired TCDD E52500 inside the locomotive shops.
