= Etimesgut railway station =

Railway station in Ankara, Turkey

ETİMESGUT
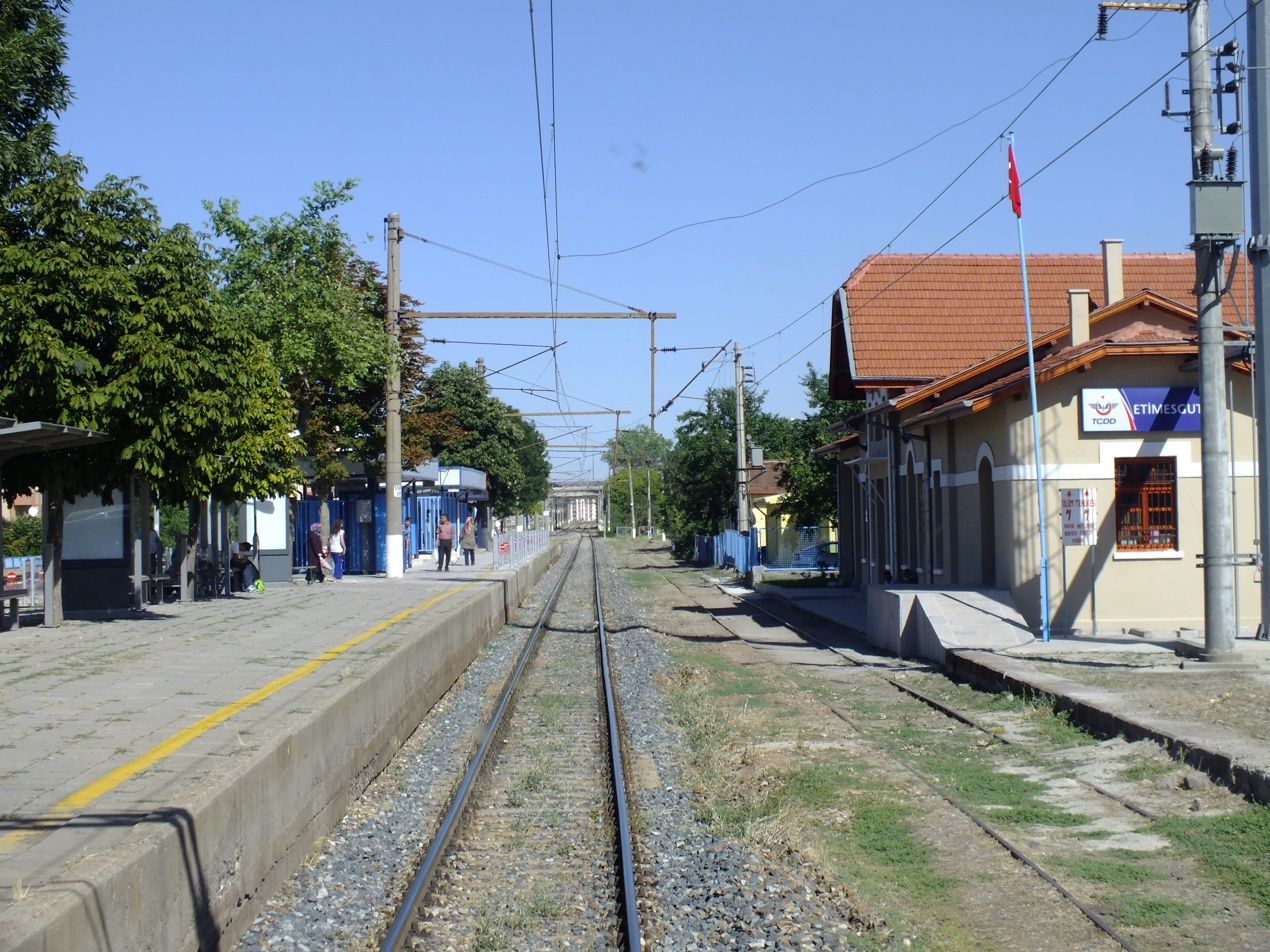
- Etimesgut station with the former suburban platform.

General information
- Location: İstasyon Cd., İstasyon Mah. 06790; Etimesgut, Ankara; Turkey
- Coordinates: 39.9491°N 32.6628°E
- System: TCDD Taşımacılık commuter rail station
- Owner: Turkish State Railways
- Operator: TCDD Taşımacılık
- Line: Başkentray
- Platforms: 1 island platform
- Tracks: 5

Construction
- Parking: No
- Cycle facilities: No
- Accessible: Yes
- Architect: Burhaneddin Tamcı

History
- Opened: 1925
- Closed: 2016-18
- Rebuilt: 1970, 2017

Services
Preceding station	TCDD Taşımacılık	Following station
Özgüneş towards Sincan	Başkentray	Havadurağı towards Kayaş
Track layout
Location

Etimesgut railway station (Turkish: Etimesgut istasyonu) is a railway station in Etimesgut, Ankara, currently under renovation. The station was a stop on the Ankara suburban from 1972 to 2016, when the station was closed for renovation. Once the rebuilt station is opened, commuter rail service will resume. Etimesgut station is located along İstasyon Avenue, near Hikmet Özer Avenue.

== History ==
The original station was built in 1925, by the Turkish government-owned Anatolian—Baghdad Railways, to service the newly formed neighborhood of Etimesgut. The station house was designed by Turkish architect Burhaneddin Tamcı, who also designed the station house of the nearby Gazi station. Until his death in 1938, when President Mustafa Kemal Atatürk traveled from Ankara, Etimesgut station was where public crowds would gather to watch his train pass by.

When the nearby Ankara Sugarcane Mill opened in 1962, freight rail cars were stored at the station's small yard. This continued until the 1990s, when the mill replaced freight rail transport with trucks.

In 1970, the Turkish State Railways expanded the station, adding a new platform in preparation for electric commuter rail service from Sincan to Kayaş. The new platform entered service in 1972 when the Ankara suburban entered revenue service. Once commuter rail service began, intercity and regional trains bypassed Etimesgut and the station became a local stop only. In 2012, the small siding on the north side of the station grounds was replaced with a new track for YHT high-speed rail. On 11 July 2016, Etimesgut station was closed to passenger traffic and the platform demolished shortly after. The railway was widened from three to five tracks and a new island platform was built with a new station house over it. The station is expected to re-open on 12 April 2018.
