= Elvankent railway station =

ELVANKENT
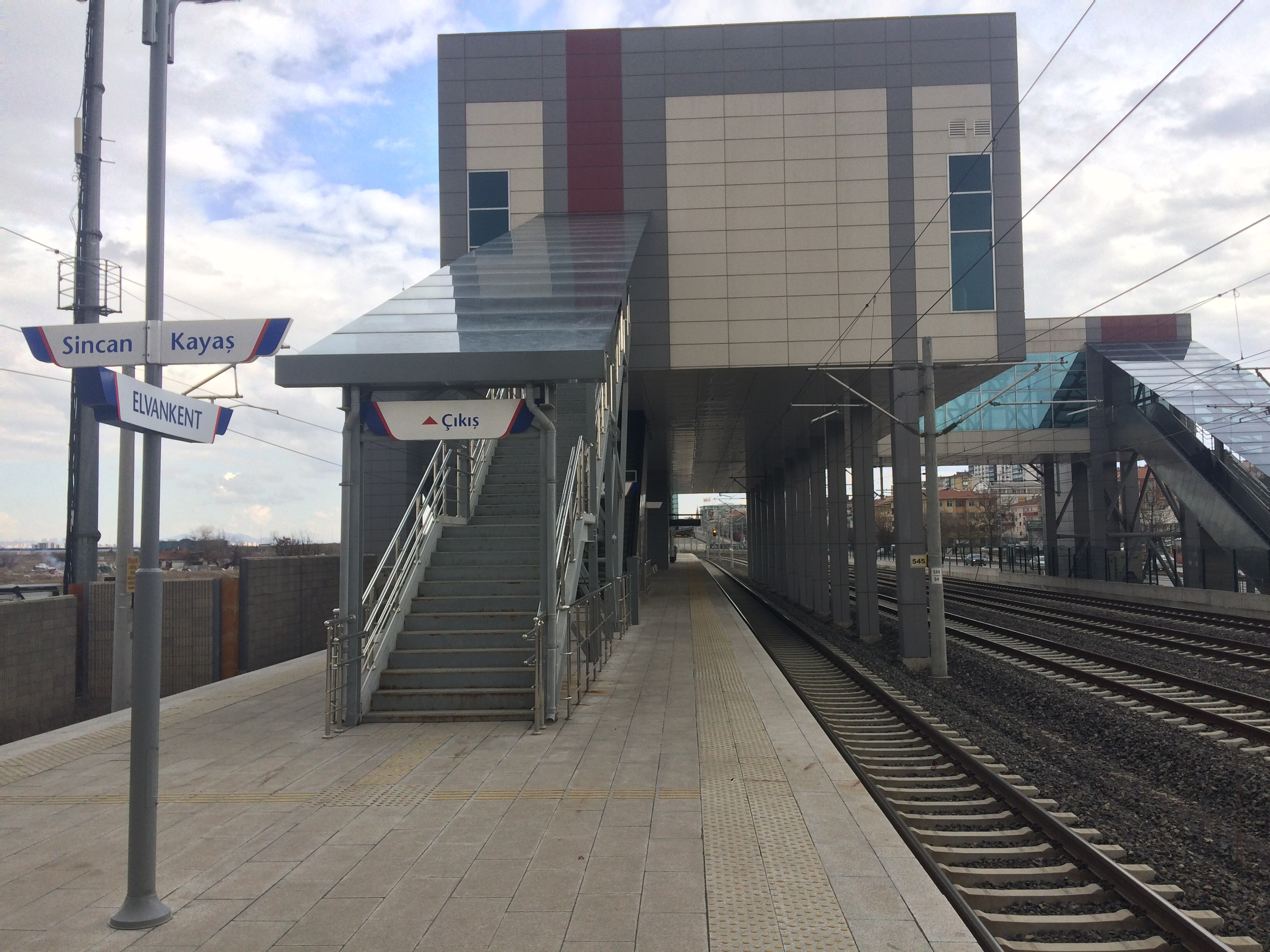

General information
- Location: İstasyon Cd., Yeşilova Mah. 06796; Etimesgut, Ankara; Turkey
- Coordinates: 39.9586°N 32.6122°E
- System: TCDD Taşımacılık commuter rail station
- Owner: Turkish State Railways
- Operator: TCDD Taşımacılık
- Line: Başkentray
- Platforms: 1 island platform
- Tracks: 5

Construction
- Parking: No
- Cycle facilities: No
- Accessible: Yes

History
- Opened: 1972
- Closed: 2016-18
- Rebuilt: 2017-18

Services
Preceding station	TCDD Taşımacılık	Following station
Lale towards Sincan	Başkentray	Eryaman YHT towards Kayaş
Track layout
Location

Elvankent railway station (Turkish: Elvankent tren istasyonu) is a railway station in Ankara, Turkey. The station was a stop on the Ankara suburban from 1972 to 2016 when it was closed and demolished shortly after, in order to rebuild and expand the railway. Construction of the new station began in 2017 and opened on 12 April 2018.

Lale station was originally built in 1970 by the Turkish State Railways, when the railway from Ankara to Sincan was double-tracked. It entered service in 1972, when electric commuter service began on the line.

The new station consists of an island platform with the station building located above the platform and is located about 230 m (750 ft) west of the old station.
