= Göksu Park =

Park that is located Eryaman, Ankara

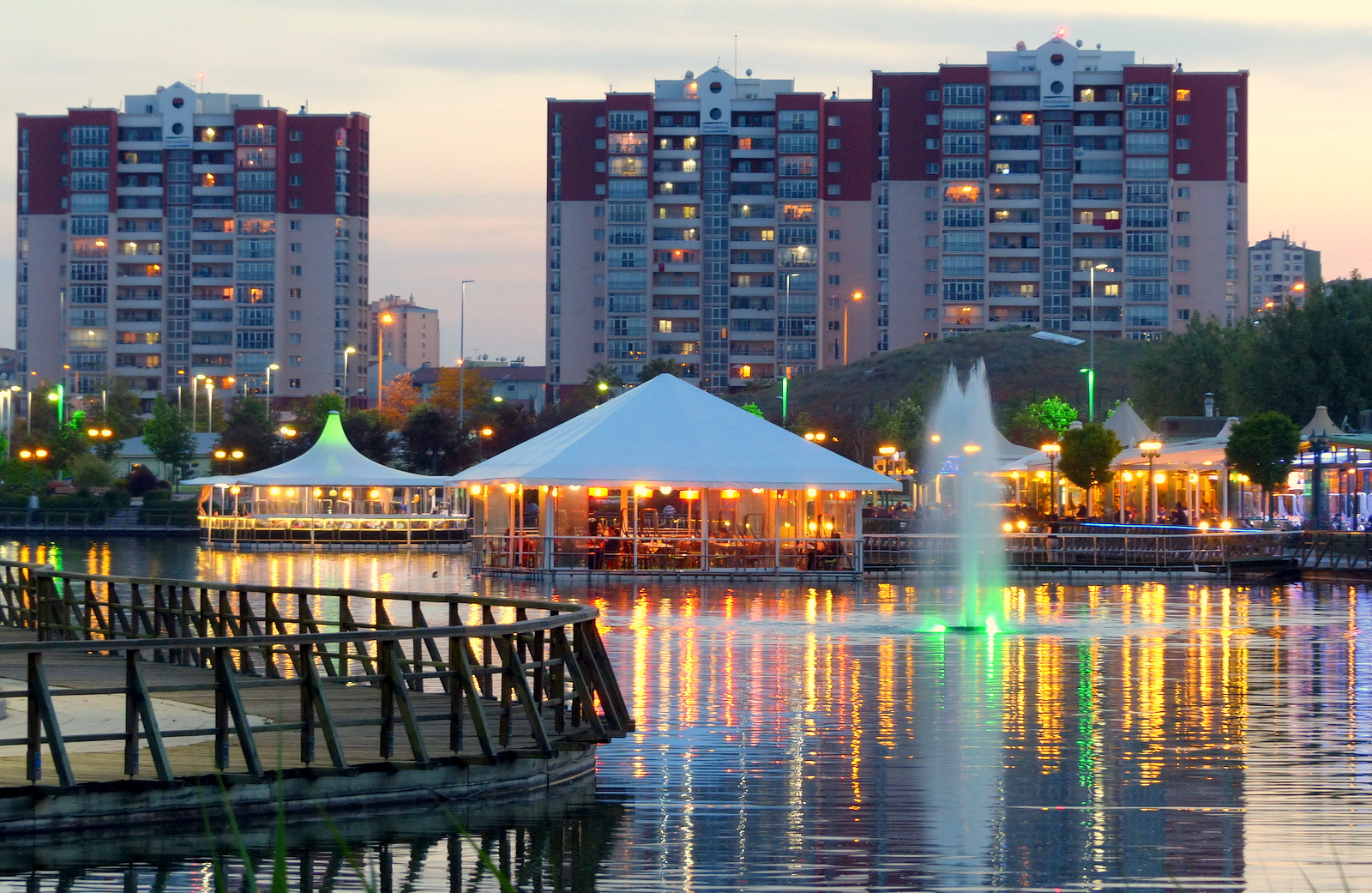
- A view of Göksu Park (2013)

- Location within Turkey
- Location: Eryaman, Ankara, Turkey
- Coordinates: 39°59′24.87″N 32°38′53.64″E
- Area: 50.8 ha (126 acres)
- Created: 2003; 23 years ago
- Website: ANFA, the management

Göksu Park is a public park in Ankara, Turkey. Göksu Park is in Eryaman, a neighbourhood in the district of Etimesgut in Ankara. The park area is 50.8 ha (126 acres). It was an unneglected lake until 2003. In 2003, the lake was taken care of by the Municipality of Ankara and Municipality of Etimesgut and the park was opened that same year.

== Gallery ==
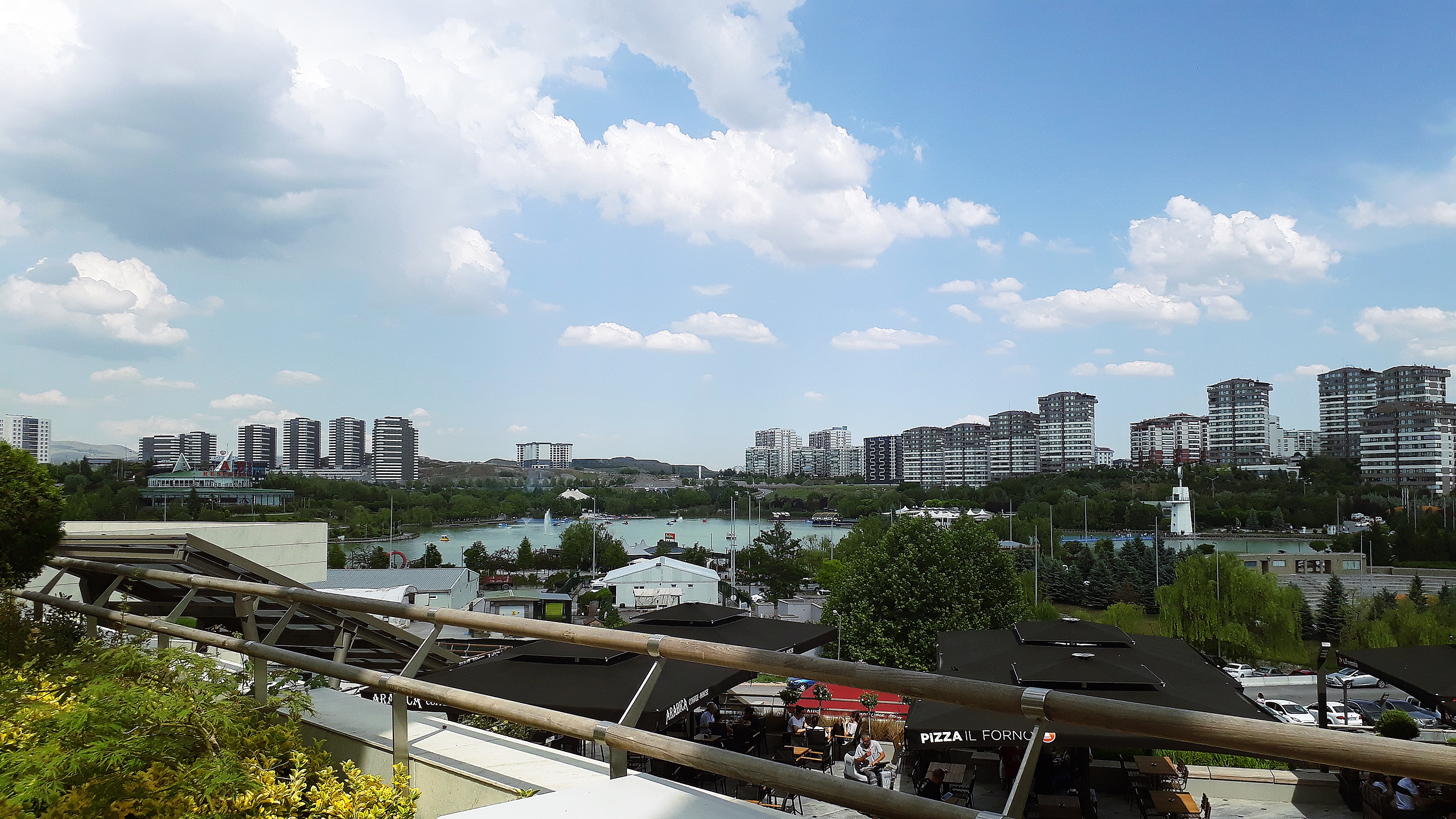
Göksu Park

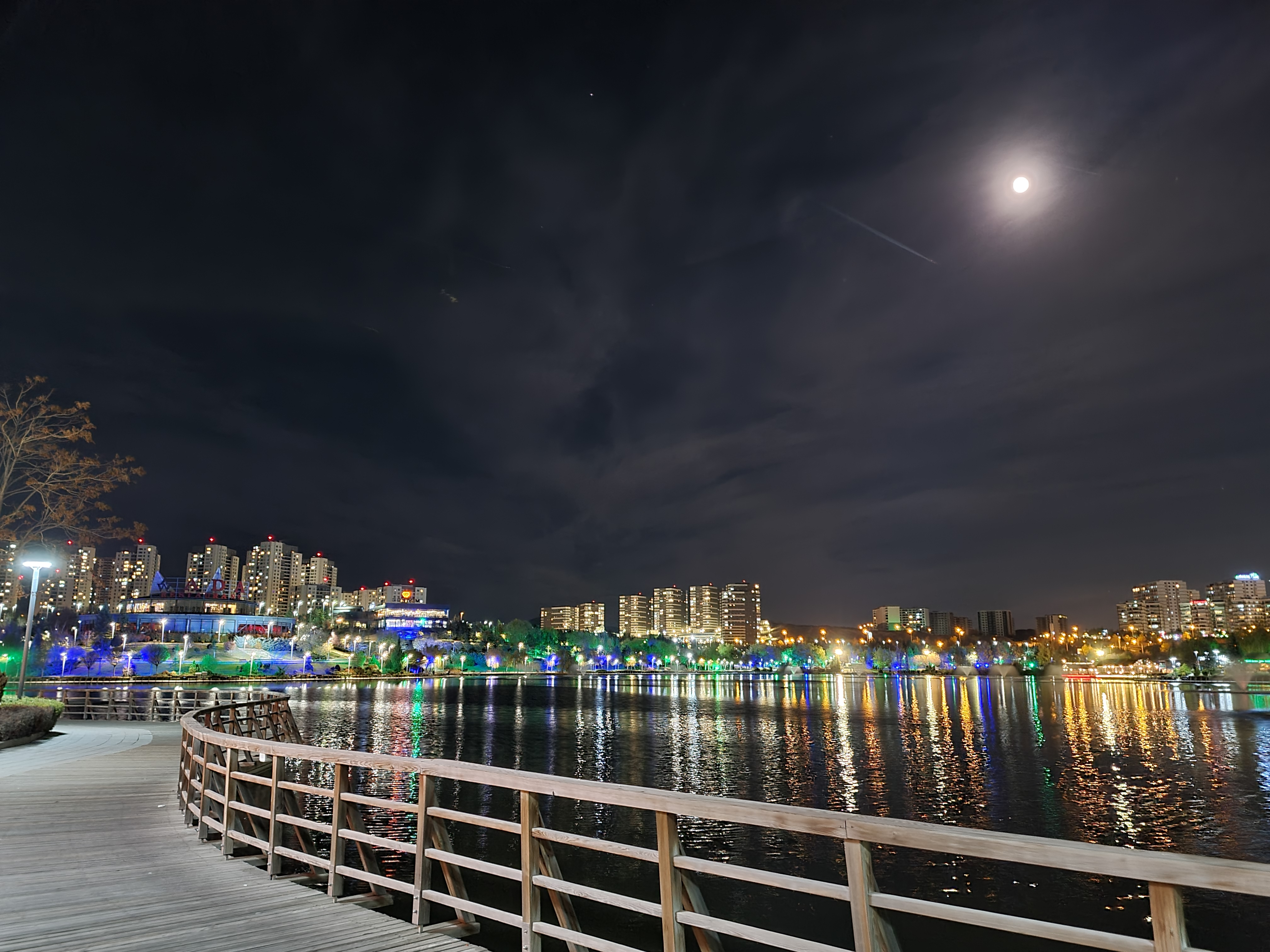
Göksu Parkı, night view

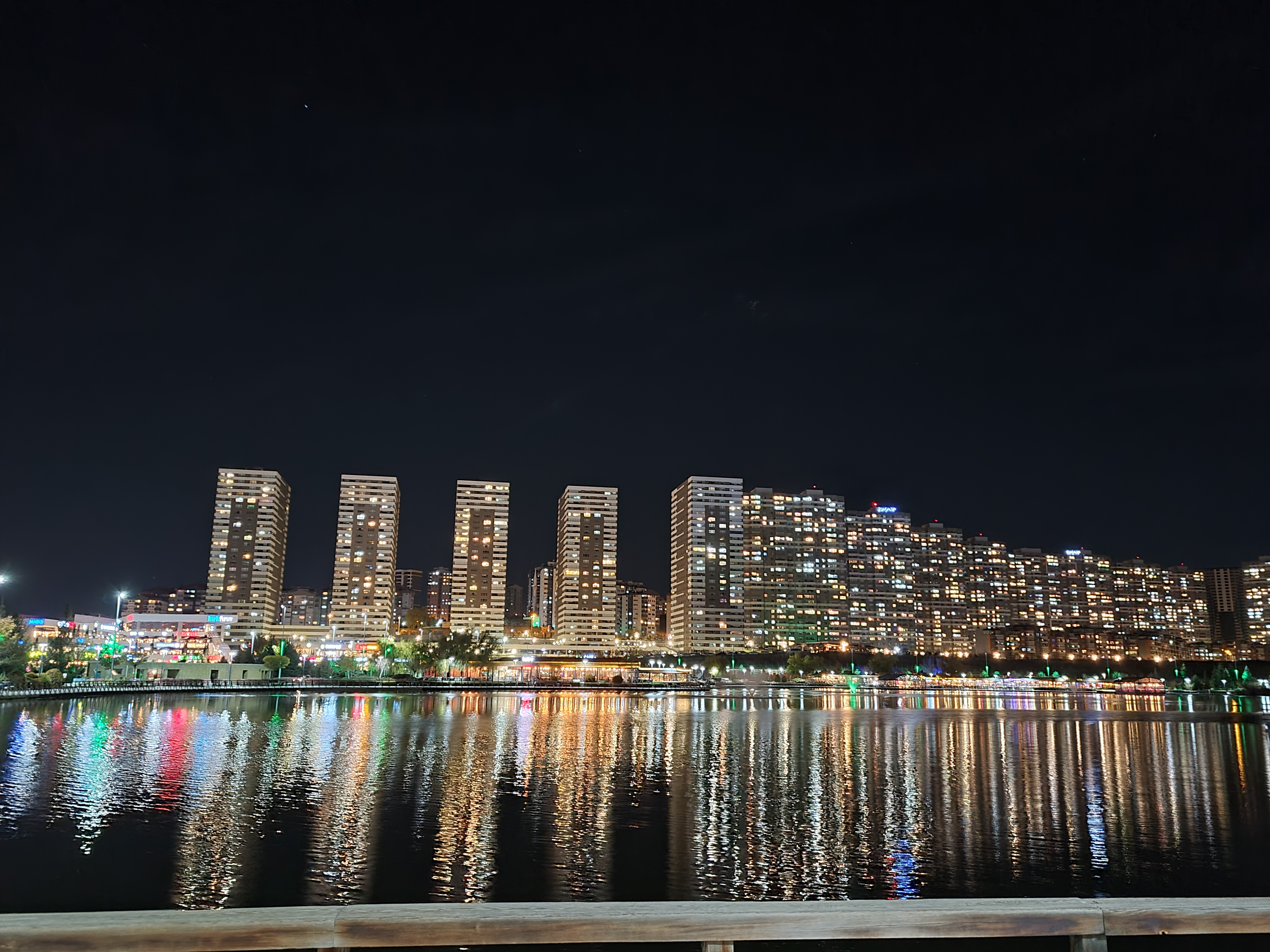
Göksu Park

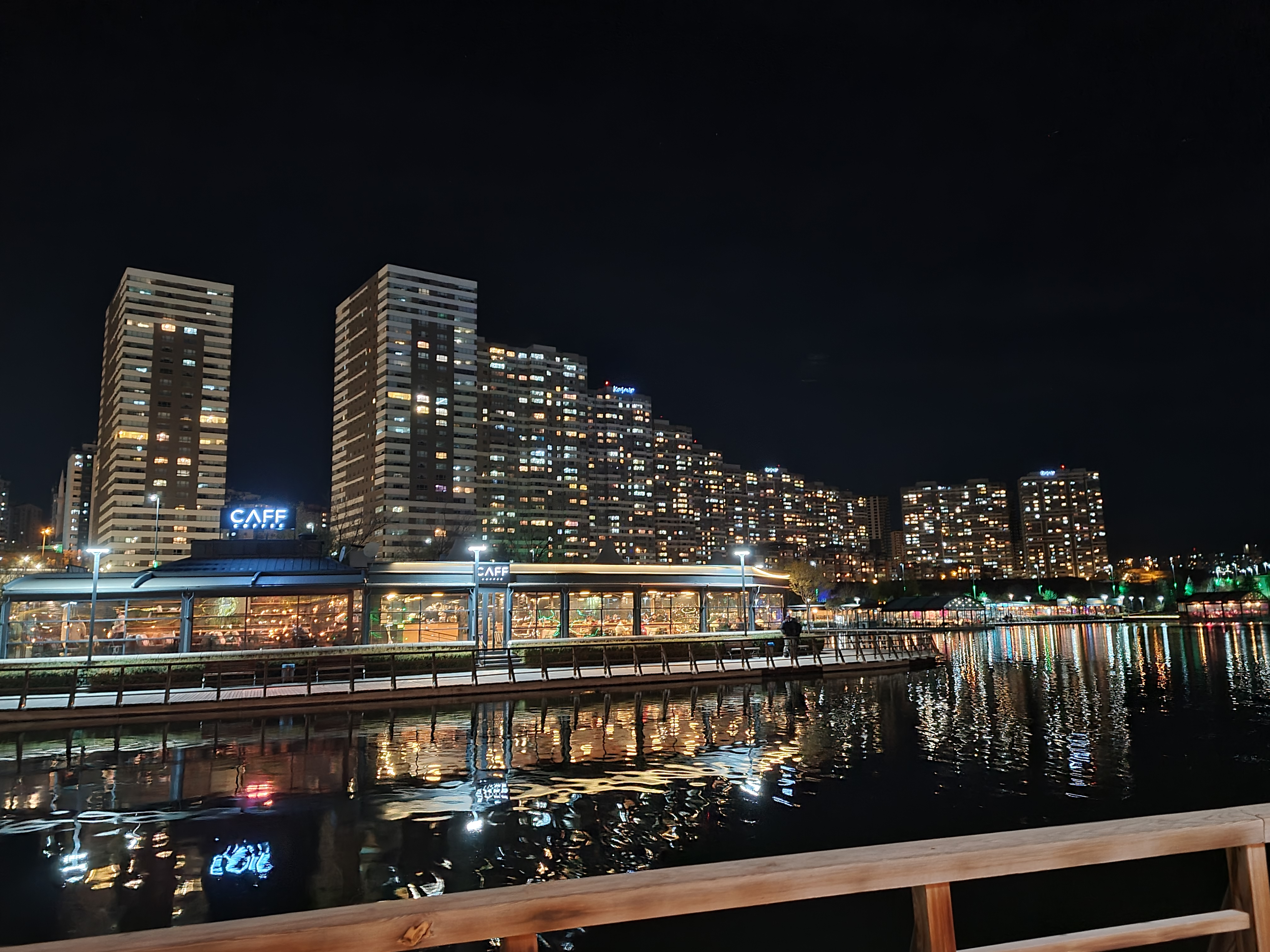
a night view of Göksu Park

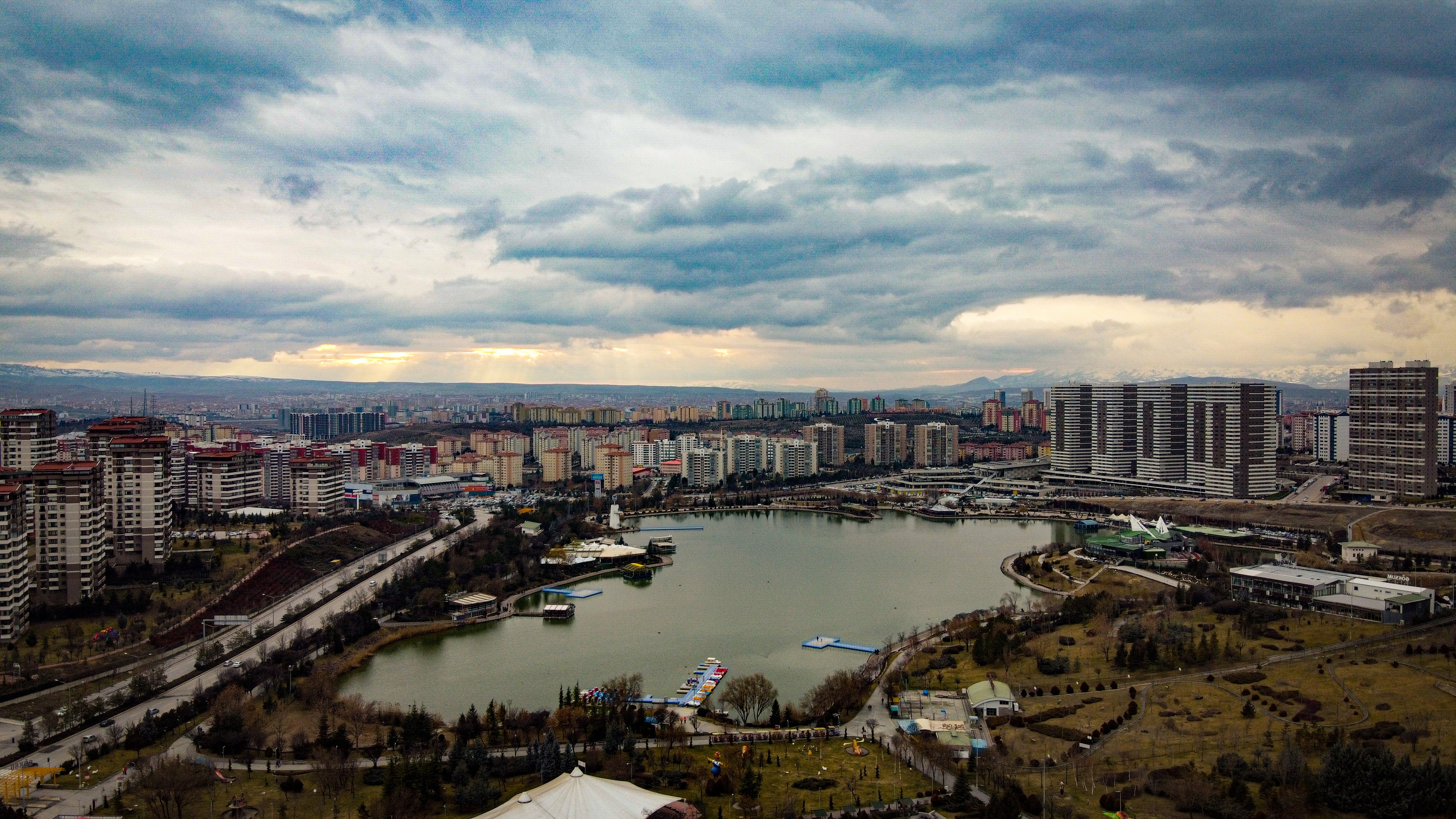
Göksu Park
