= Lale railway station =

Railway station in Ankara, Turkey

LALE
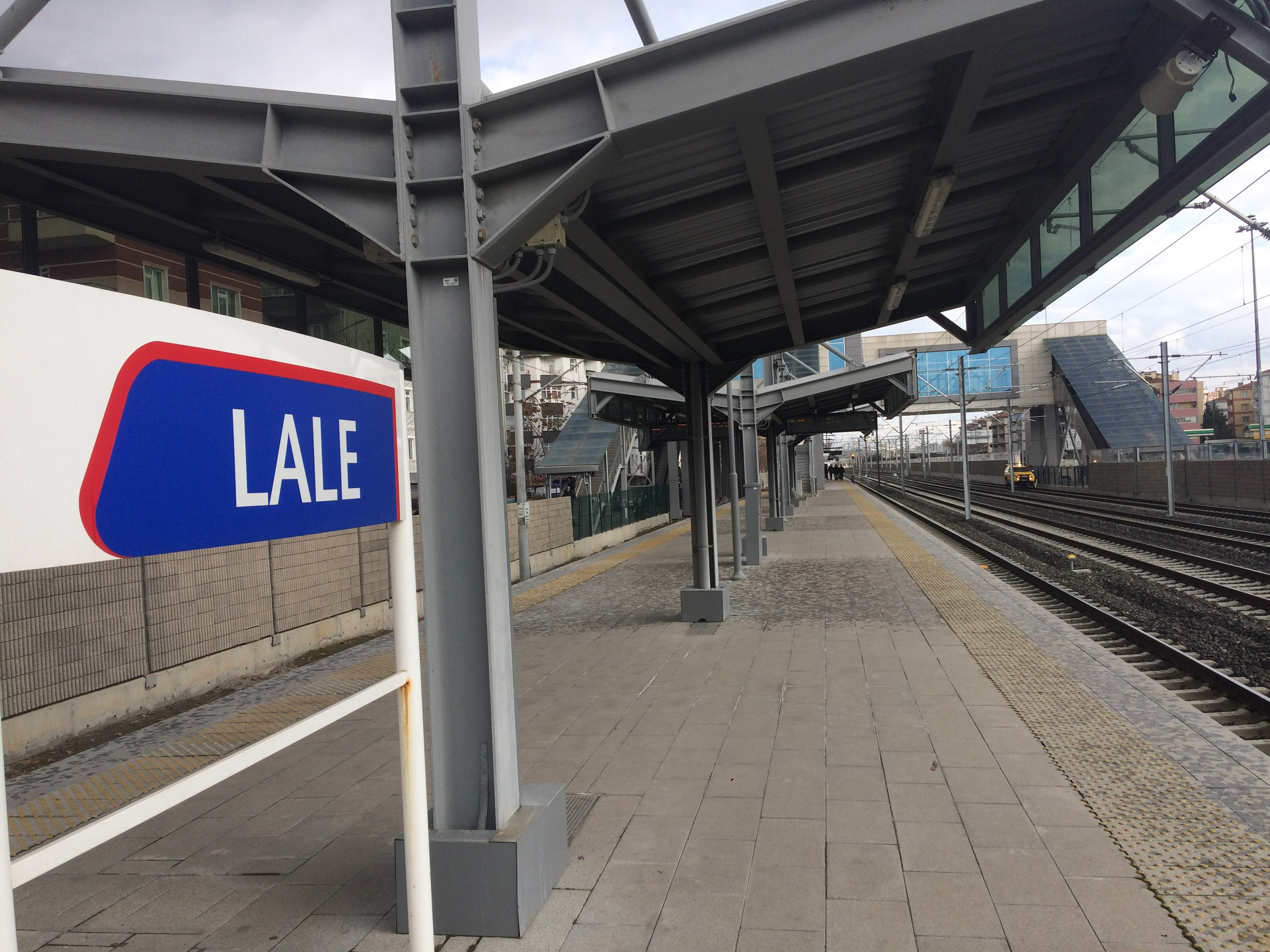

General information
- Location: Gülhane Sk., Plevne Mah. 06934; Sincan, Ankara; Turkey
- Coordinates: 39.9615°N 32.5987°E
- System: TCDD Taşımacılık commuter rail station
- Owner: Turkish State Railways
- Operator: TCDD Taşımacılık
- Line: Başkentray
- Platforms: 1 island platform
- Tracks: 5

Construction
- Parking: No
- Cycle facilities: No
- Accessible: Yes

History
- Opened: 1972
- Closed: 2016-18
- Rebuilt: 2017-18
- Former names: Lale YHT (2018)

Services
| Preceding station | TCDD Taşımacılık | Following station |
|---|---|---|
| Sincan Terminus | Başkentray | Elvankent towards Kayaş |
Track layout
Location

Lale railway station (Turkish: Lale istasyonu) is a railway station in Ankara, Turkey. The station was a stop on the Ankara suburban from 1972 to 2016 when it was closed and demolished shortly after, in order to rebuild and expand the railway. Construction of the new station began in 2017 and opened on 12 April 2018.

Lale station was originally built in 1970 by the Turkish State Railways, when the railway from Ankara to Sincan was double-tracked. It entered service in 1972, when electric commuter service began on the line.

Between 10 January and 15 March 2018, Lale station briefly hosted YHT high-speed trains, following the closure of Sincan station until the opening of Eryaman station.
