= Yavuz Selim, Etimesgut =

Yavuz Selim
- Neighbourhood
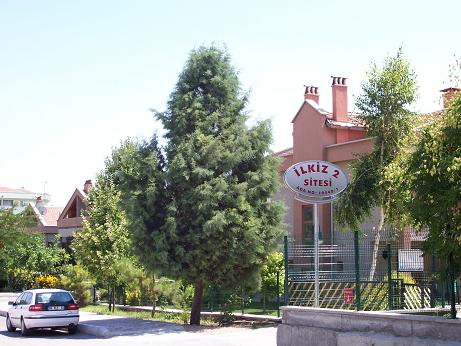

- Location within Turkey Location within Turkey Central Anatolia
- Coordinates: 39°59′56″N 32°36′47″E
- Country: Turkey
- Province: Ankara
- District: Etimesgut
- Population (2022): 11,021
- Time zone: UTC+3 (TRT)

Yavuz Selim is a neighbourhood in the municipality and district of Etimesgut, Ankara Province, Turkey. Its population is 11,021 (2022). It is between Güzelkent and Ata.

The district is about 30 km to the Ankara city centre, and 60 km to the Esenboğa International Airport.

== Yavuz Selim District Photos ==
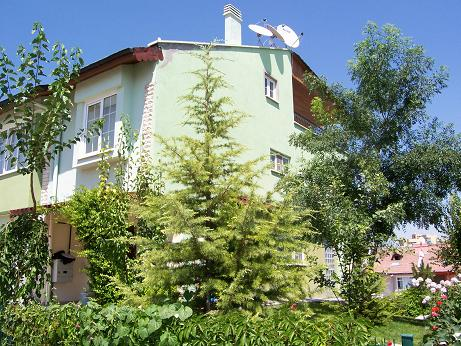

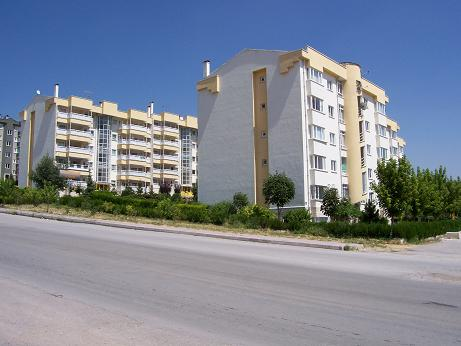
