= Eryaman, Etimesgut =

Eryaman
- Neighbourhood
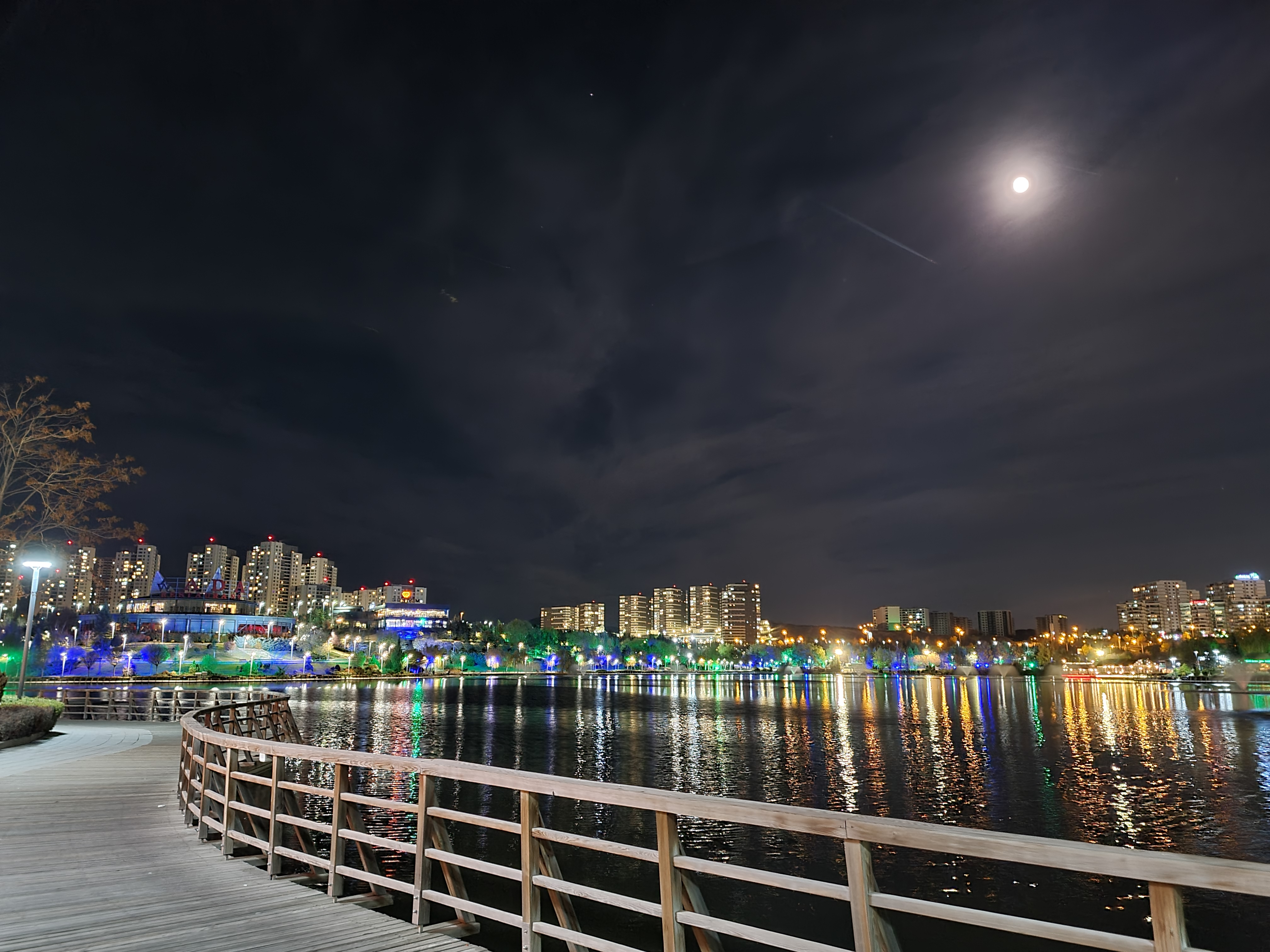
- Göksu Park in Eryaman

- Location within Turkey Location within Turkey Central Anatolia
- Coordinates: 39°58′N 32°37′E
- Country: Turkey
- Province: Ankara
- District: Etimesgut
- Population (2022): 30,275
- Time zone: UTC+3 (TRT)

Eryaman is a neighbourhood in the municipality and district of Etimesgut, Ankara Province, Turkey. Located 28 km west of the city centre of Ankara, its population is 30,275 as of 2022.

The Göksu Park located here is a public park and neighborhood that surrounds the small natural lake

== See also ==
- Güzelkent, Etimesgut

== Image gallery ==
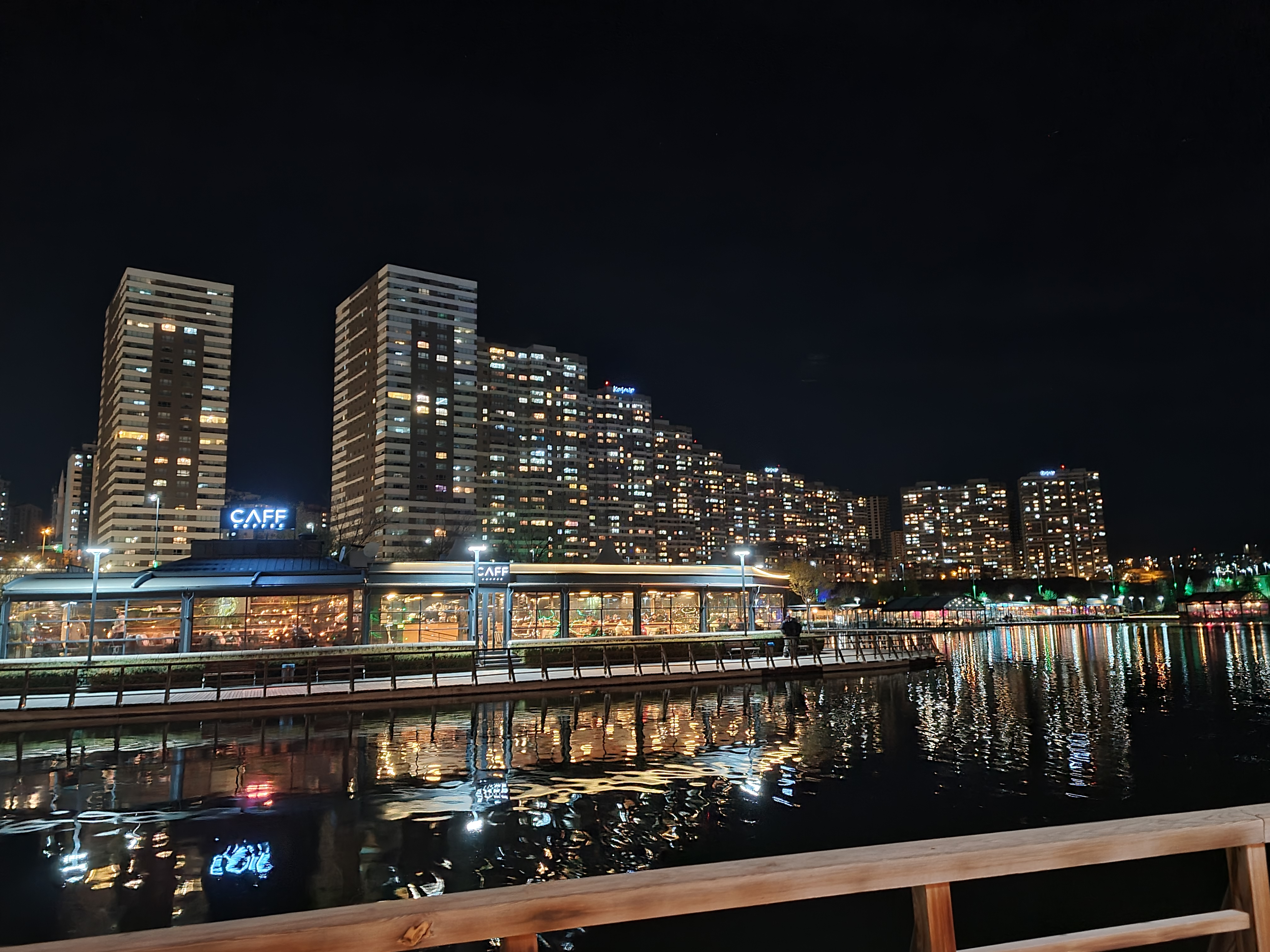
A view from Göksu Park

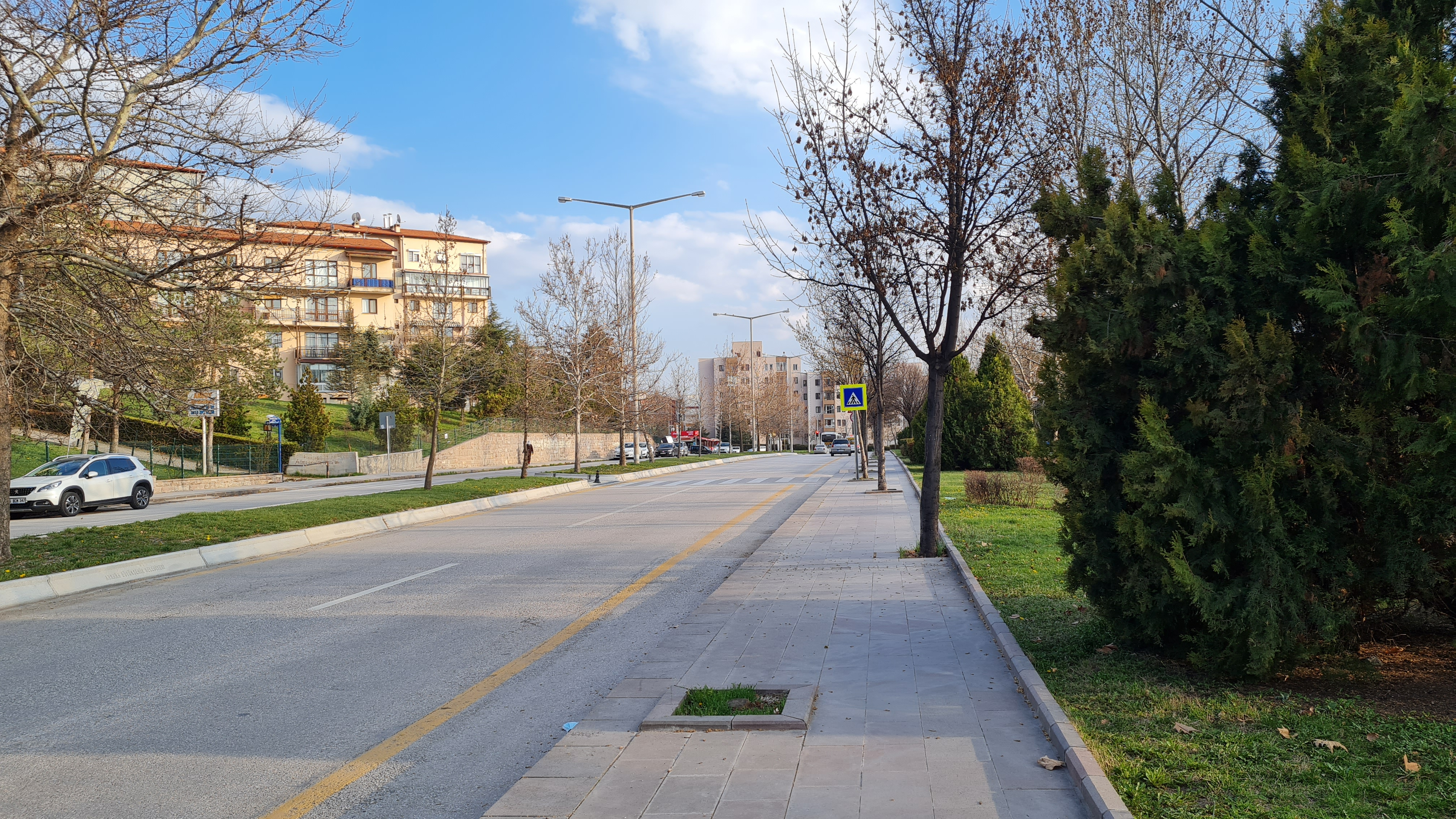
Güzelkent, Sakarya Zaferi Street

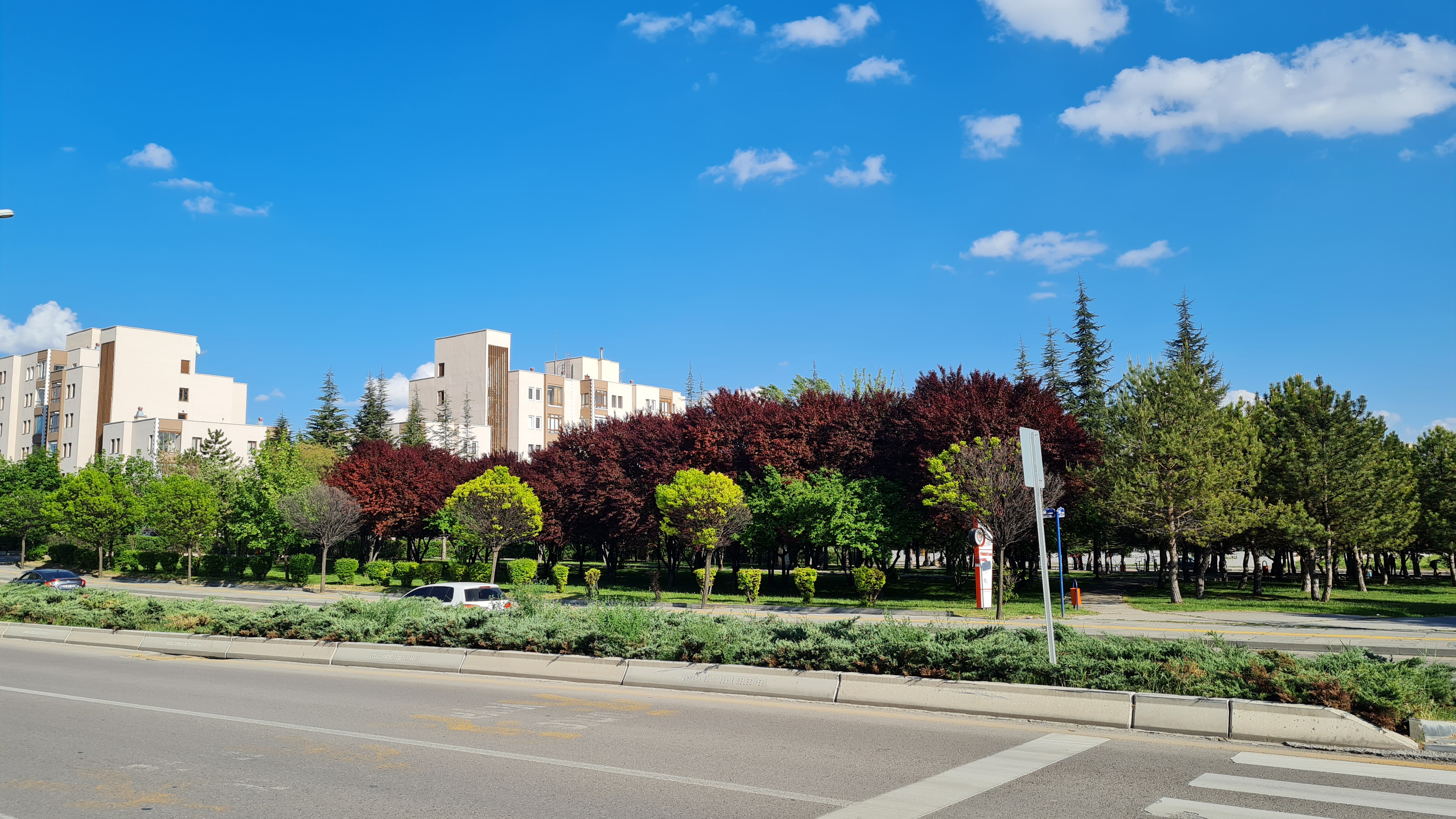
Güzelkent, TBMM Street

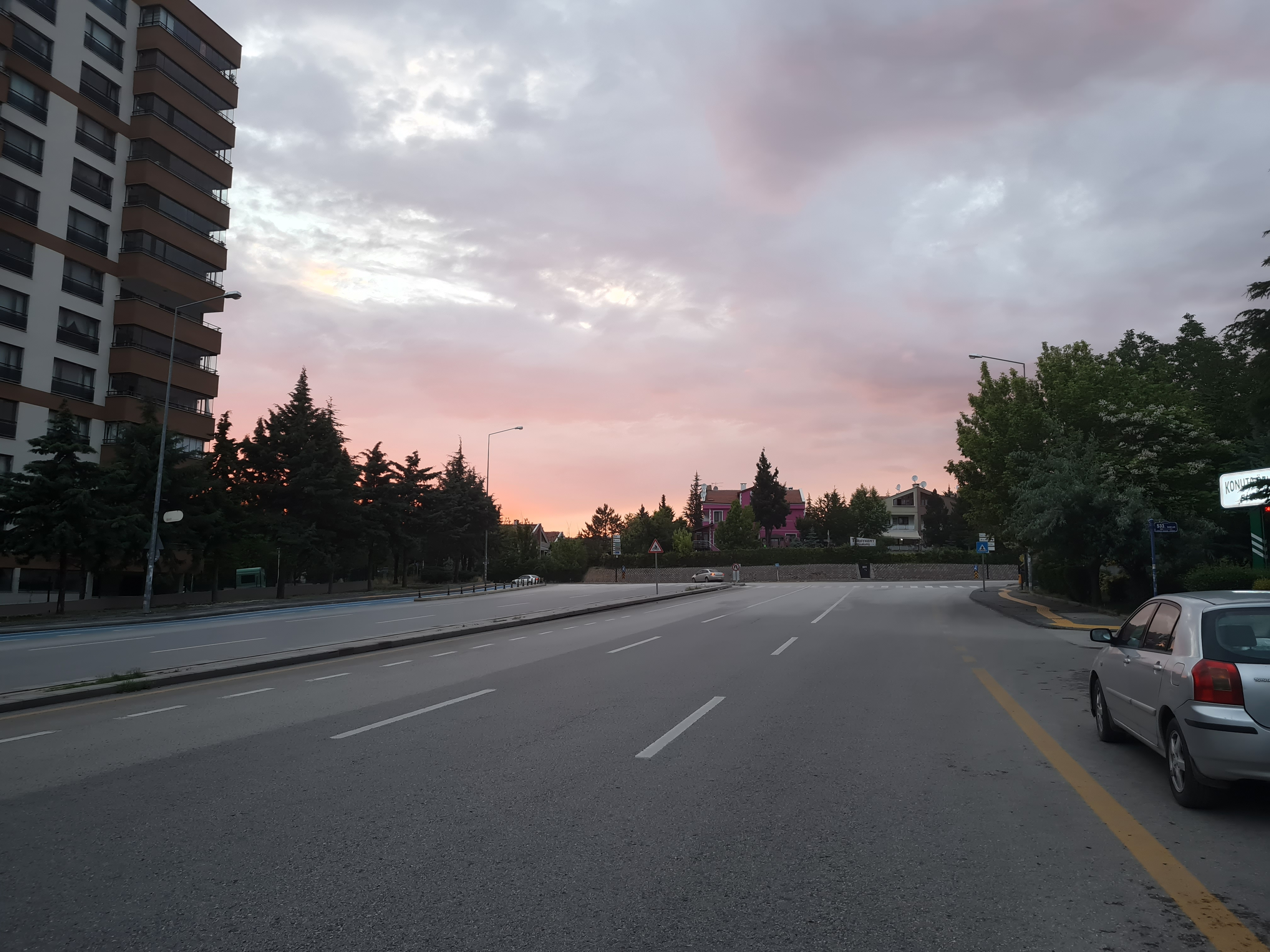
Üçşehitler avenue

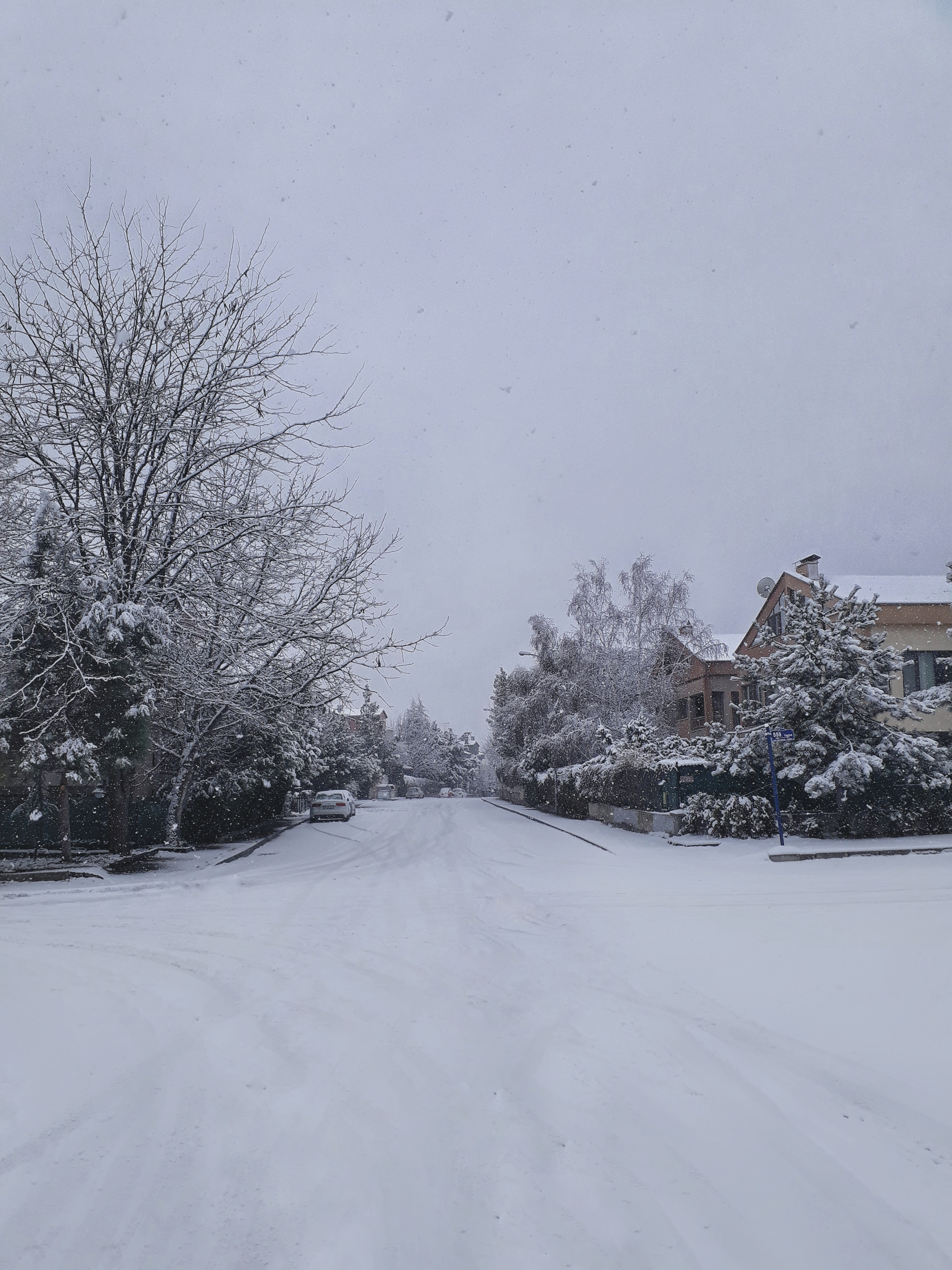
A view from the snowy 543rd Street

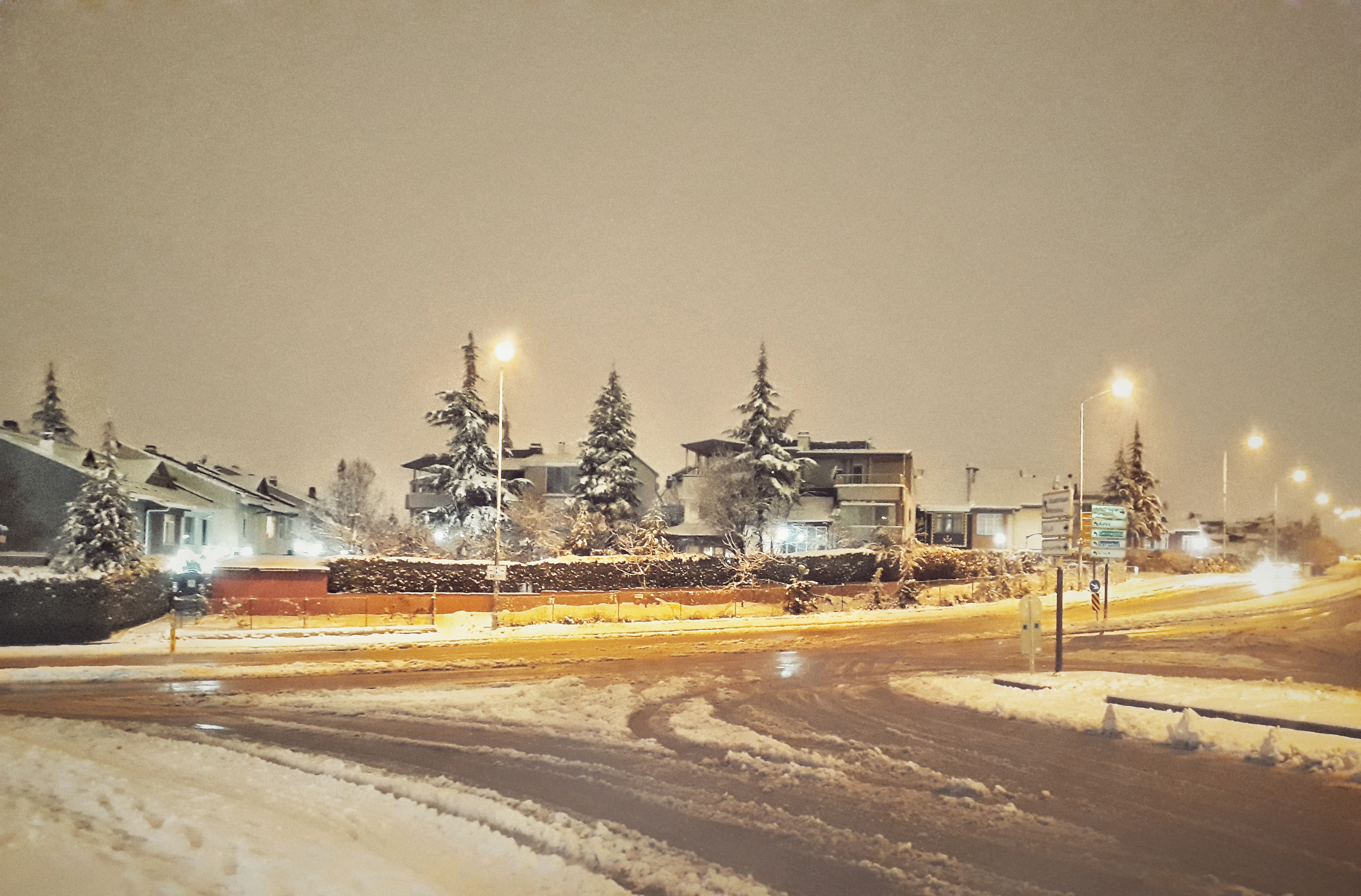
A snowy and snowy view in Yavuz Selim neighborhood, Eryaman

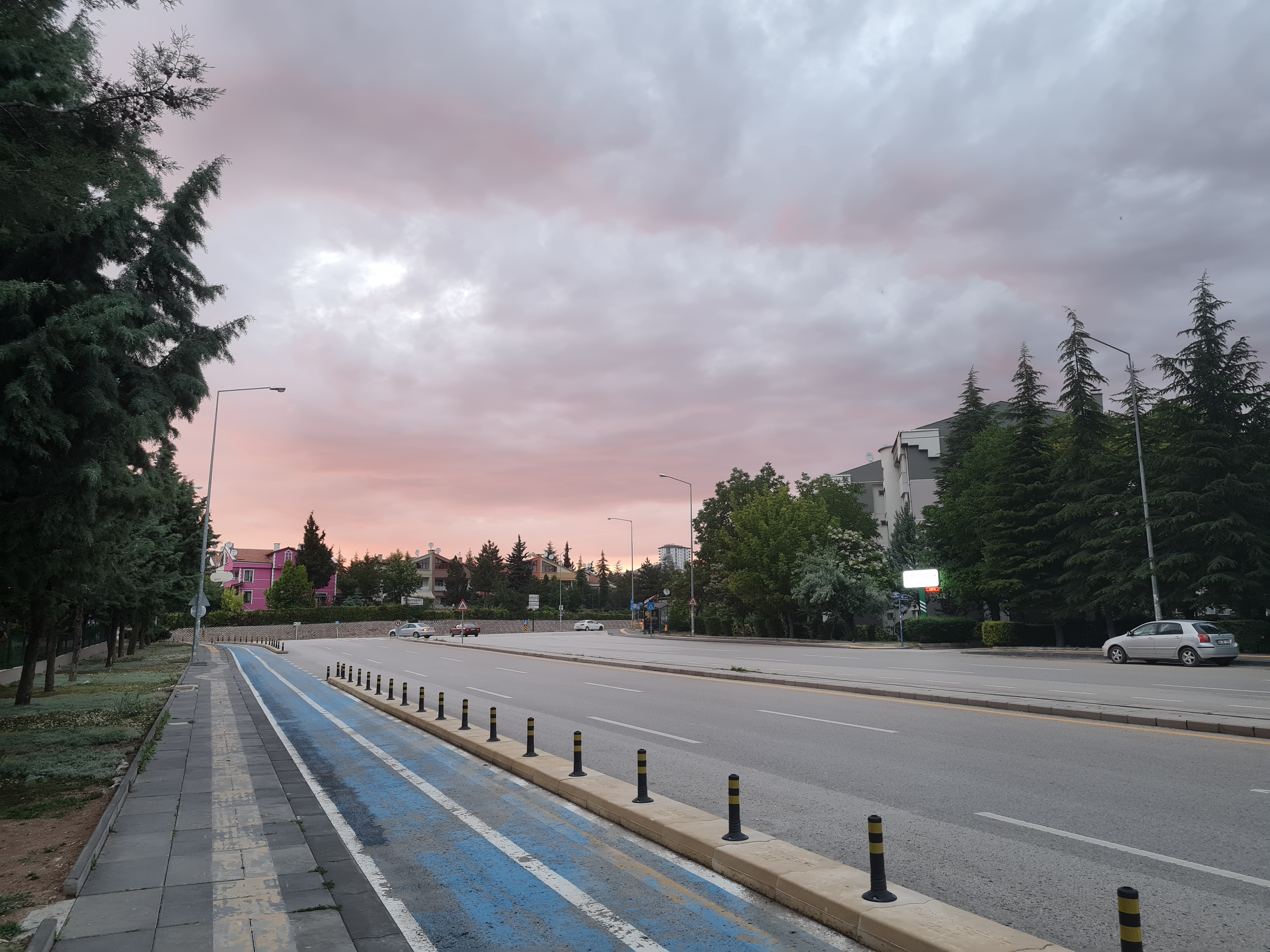
Üçşehitler avenue

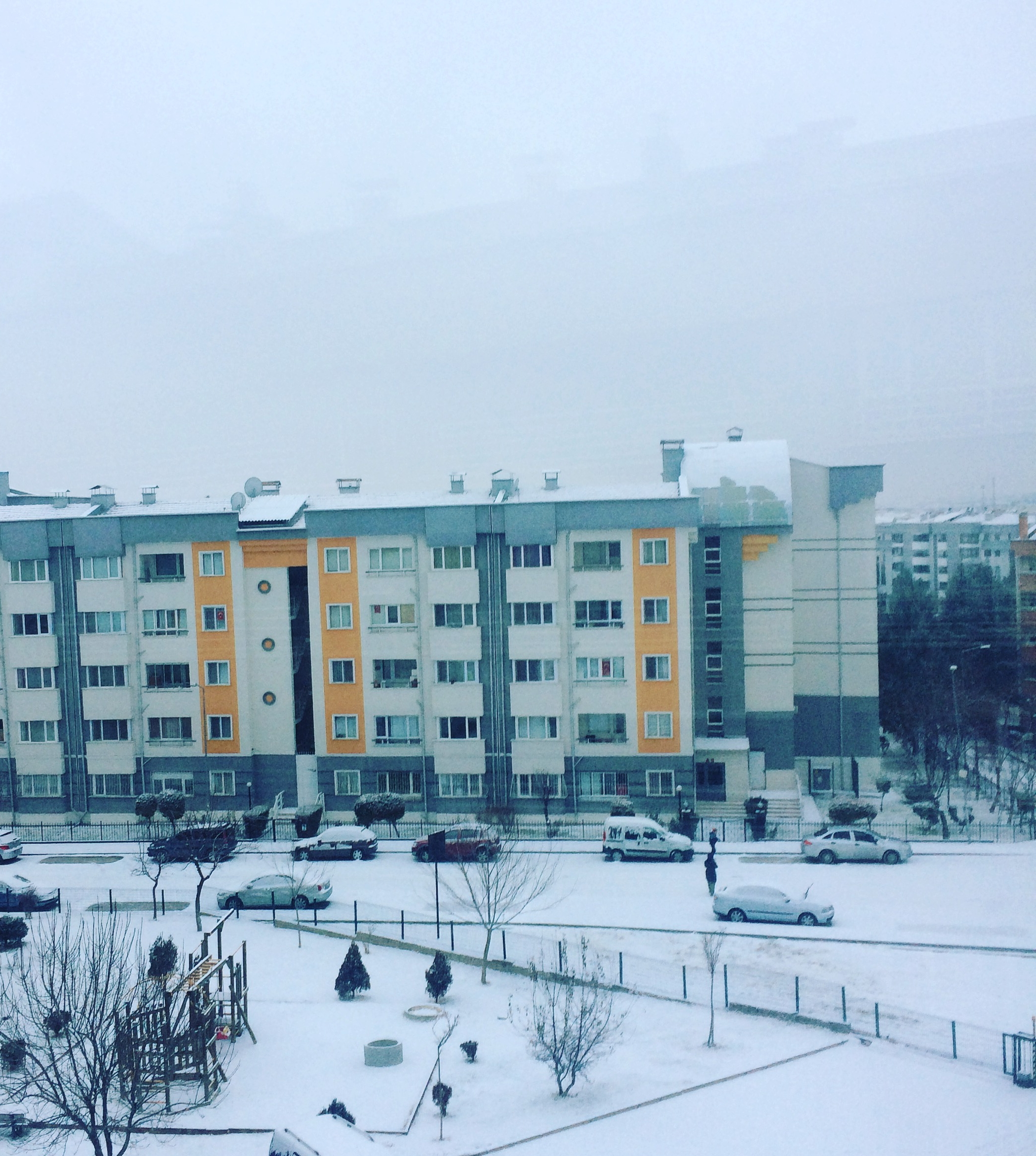
Snowy 519th street
