= Etimesgut YHT Maintenance Facility =

Rail yard in Turkey

Coordinates: 39.959132°N 32.629037°E

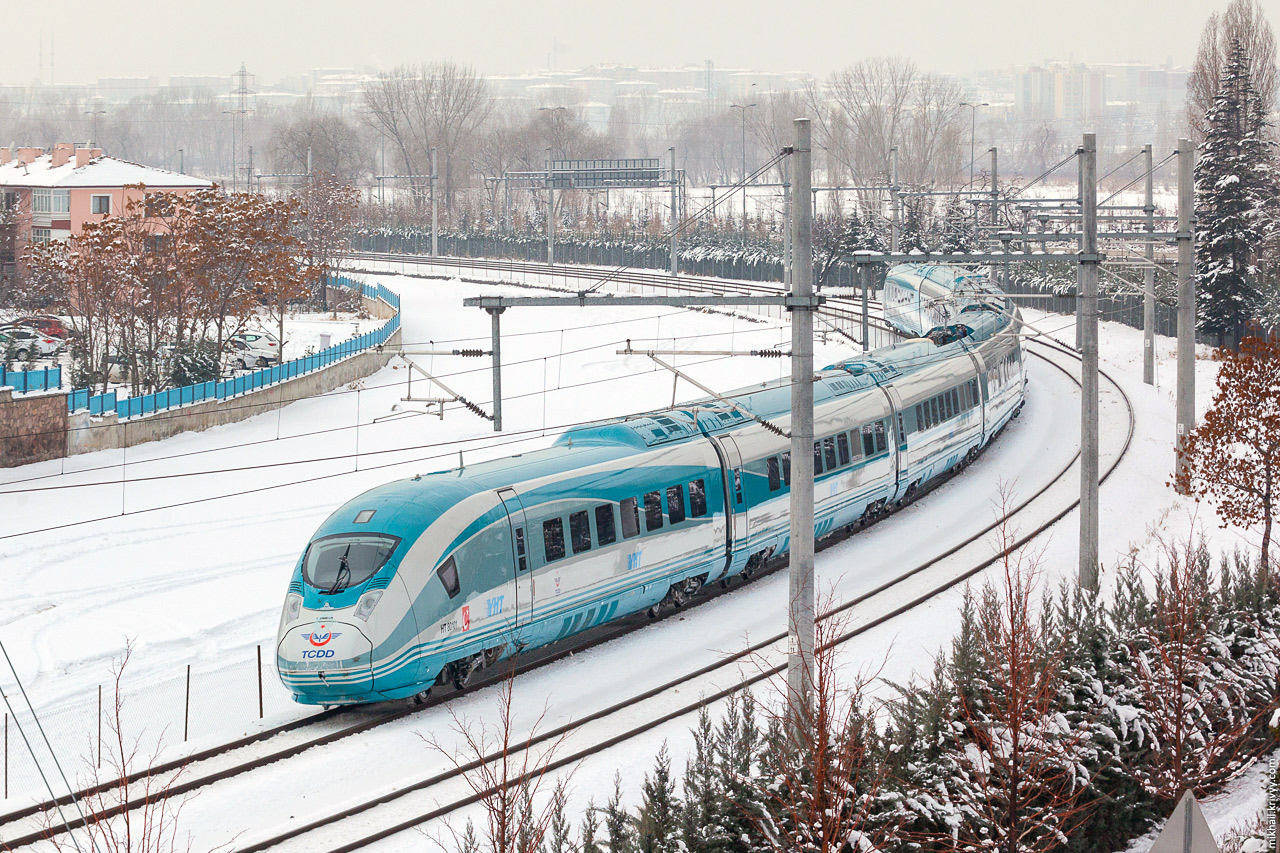
High-speed train-sets such as the TCDD HT80000 EMUs will be maintained and stored in the Etimesgut facility.

The Etimesgut High-speed rail maintenance facility (Turkish: Etimesgut Yüksek Hızlı Tren ana bakım deposu), officially known as the Main High-speed rail Maintenance Facility (Turkish: YHT Ana Bakım Deposu), is a passenger rail yard used exclusively for YHT high-speed train-sets in Ankara, Turkey. Located in the Etiler neighborhood in northwestern Etimesgut, it is the second largest rail yard in Turkey spanning over 64 hectares (160 acres).

The yard contains a large high-speed rail maintenance shop together with a high-speed rail focused training facility for employees. A wide turning loop, facing east, spans the perimeter of the facility. Ankara West YHT station is under construction, just south of the facility, and will become a main railway station in west Ankara; it is scheduled to open by December 2017.

Entrance to the facility is via the D.140, from the north.

Construction of the facility began in late 2013, on land bought from the Etimesgut Sugar Factory, and completed in February 2016. It is owned by the Turkish State Railways.

== See also ==
- Ankara Tren Garı
- Ankara West YHT station
