= Eryaman YHT railway station =

Railway station in Ankara, Turkey

Eryaman YHT
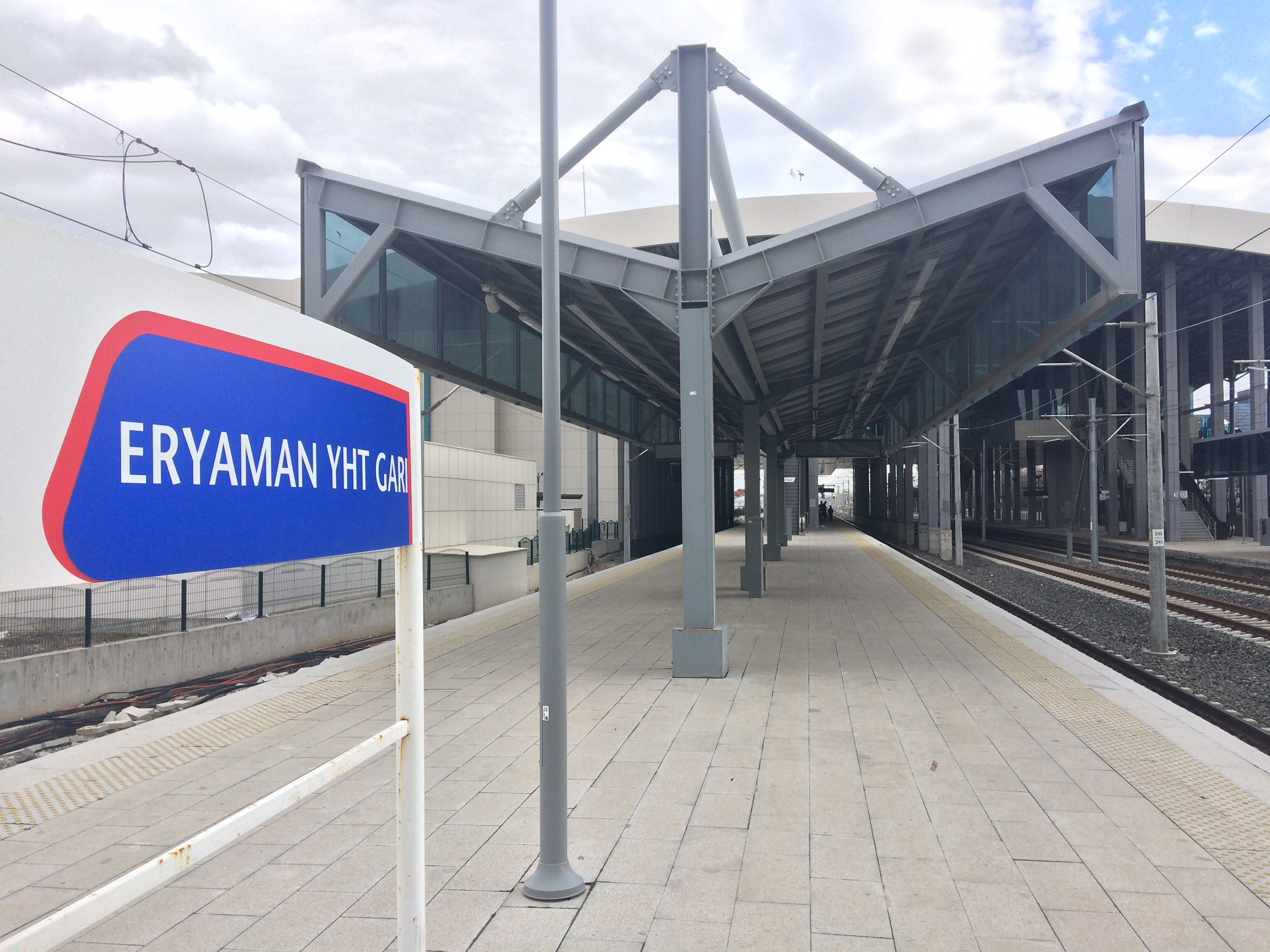
- The Başkentray platform, with the YHT platform on the right.

General information
- Location: İstasyon Cd. Etiler Mah. 06796; Etimesgut, Ankara; Turkey
- Coordinates: 39.9556°N 32.6304°E
- System: TCDD Taşımacılık high-speed rail station
- Owner: Turkish State Railways
- Operator: TCDD Taşımacılık
- Line: Yüksek Hızlı Tren Başkentray
- Platforms: 3 (2 island platforms, 1 side platform)
- Tracks: 6
- Connections: EGO Bus: 507, 507.2, 510-3, 511, 511-3, 512-3, 513-2, 523, 524

Construction
- Parking: Yes
- Accessible: Yes
- Architectural style: Modernism

History
- Opened: 15 March 2018

Services
Preceding station	TCDD Taşımacılık	Following station
Polatlı YHT towards Istanbul Halkalı	Yüksek Hızlı Tren	Ankara Terminus
Polatlı YHT towards Karaman	Yüksek Hızlı Tren	Ankara Terminus
Elvankent towards Sincan	Başkentray	Özgüneş towards Kayaş
Future service
Polatlı YHT towards İzmir (Alsancak)	Yüksek Hızlı Tren	Ankara Terminus
Location

Eryaman YHT railway station (Turkish: Eryaman YHT garı), previously known as Ankara West YHT railway station (Turkish: Ankara Batı YHT garı), is a railway station in Ankara, Turkey. Once Başkentray commuter rail service begins in April, the station will become a transfer point between YHT high-speed trains and local commuter trains, replacing Sincan station. Eryaman station also replaced Emirler station, located about 175 m (574 ft) east of the station, which was demolished in July 2016.

Eryaman YHT station consists of two island platforms serving four tracks, with two more tracks for bypassing trains. A large station building houses a waiting lounge, cafes and ticket offices. Next to the station is the Etimesgut Yard, opened in February 2016, which is a large maintenance facility and train yard for YHT train-sets.

== Station Layout ==
Street	Station house	Entrances/Exits
Tracks
Tracks	Track 1	← Başkentray toward Sincan
Tracks	Island platform (Platform 1), doors will open on the left
Tracks	Track 2	Başkentray toward Kayaş →
Tracks	Track 3	← Yüksek Hızlı Tren toward Halkalı or Karaman, does not stop here
Tracks	Track 4	← Yüksek Hızlı Tren toward Halkalı or Karaman
Tracks	Island platform (Platform 2), doors will open on the left
Tracks	Track 5	Yüksek Hızlı Tren toward Ankara →
Tracks	Track 6	Yüksek Hızlı Tren toward Ankara, does not stop here →
