= Güzelkent, Etimesgut =

Güzelkent
- Neighbourhood
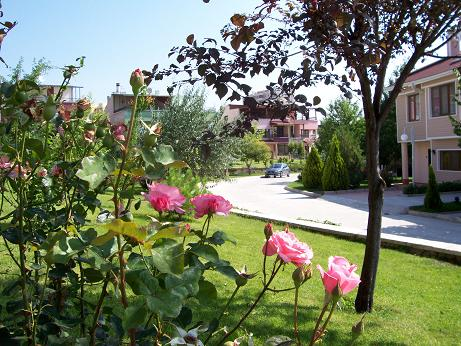
- Güzelkent neighbourhood

- Location within Turkey Location within Turkey Central Anatolia
- Coordinates: 39°59′24″N 32°36′36″E
- Country: Turkey
- Province: Ankara
- District: Etimesgut
- Population (2022): 15,384
- Time zone: UTC+3 (TRT)

Güzelkent (literally "beautiful city" in Turkish) is a neighbourhood in the municipality and district of Etimesgut, Ankara Province, Turkey. Its population is 15,384 (2022). It is located near the Eryaman neighbourhood, 25 km far from the city centre of Ankara, and is bordered by Eryaman, Sincan, Fatih and Etimesgut.

Even though the neighbourhood is populated mostly by towers, the villas region is dominated by detached and semi-detached houses.

The Ankara underground reaches the district and the Masal Dünyası (Fairy Tale Land) and Göksu Park Lake near the district.

== Güzelkent photos ==
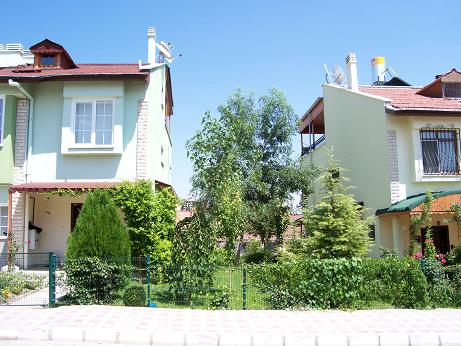

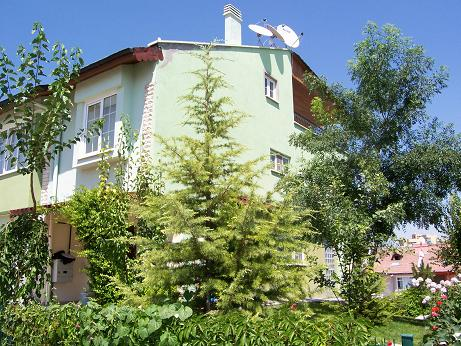

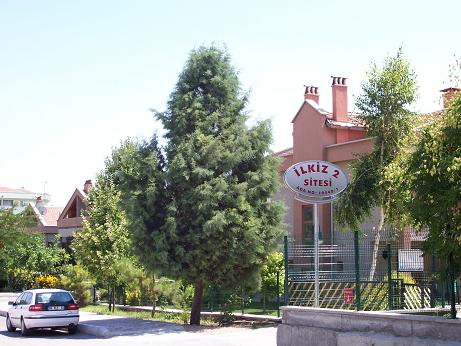

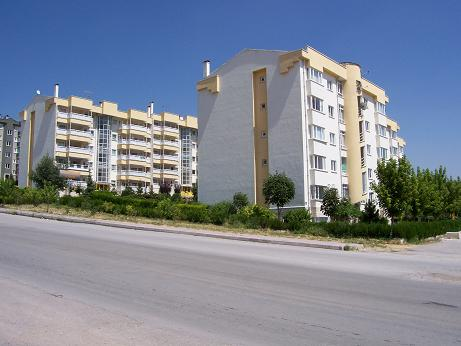
