= Sincan railway station =

Railway station in Ankara, Turkey

Sincan
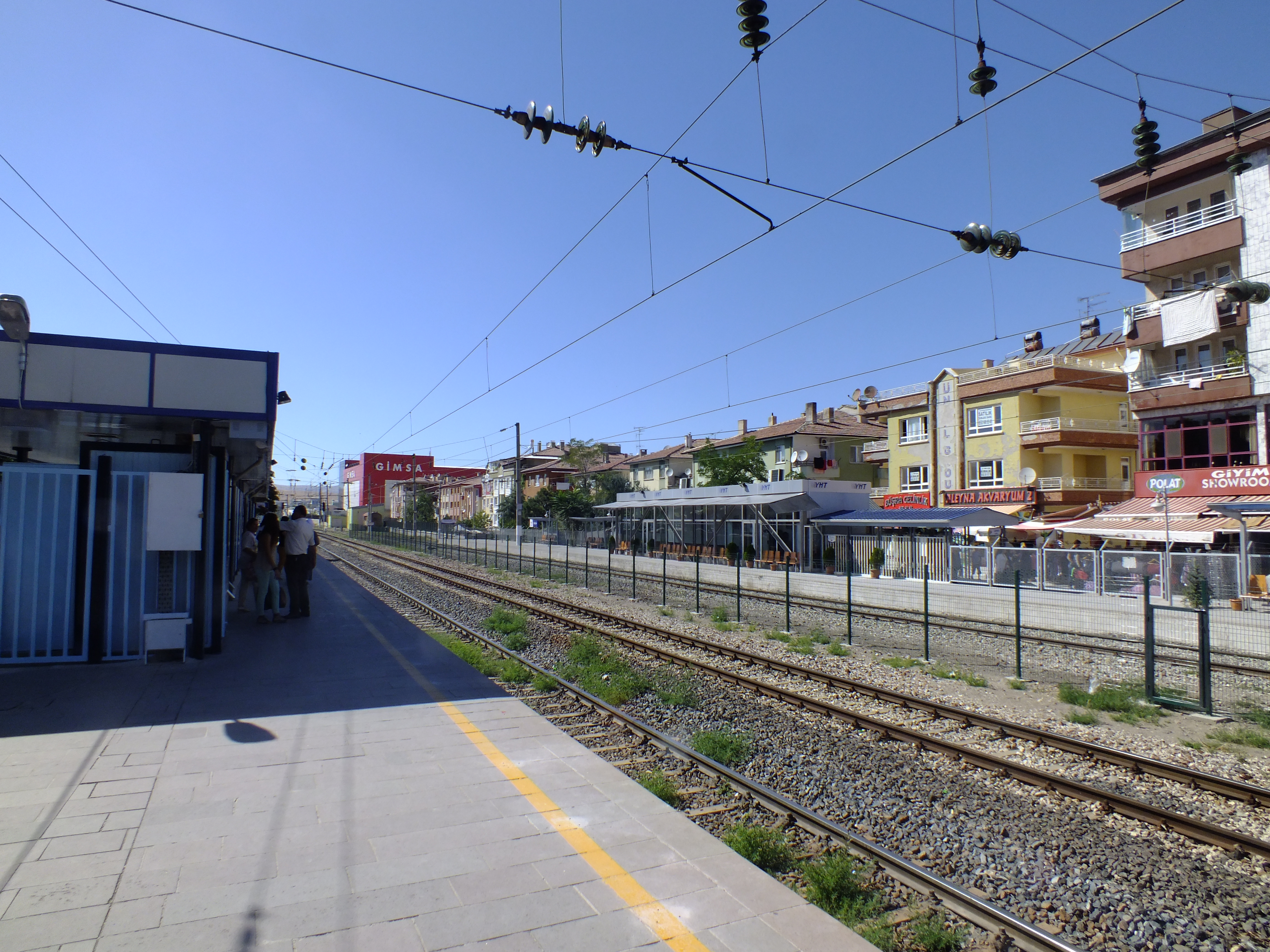
- Looking at the high-speed train platform from the commuter train platform.

General information
- Location: Atatürk Cd. 40, Atatürk Mah. 06936, Sincan; Ankara; Turkey
- Coordinates: 39.964933°N 32.582902°E,
- Owner: Turkish State Railways
- Line: Istanbul-Ankara railway
- Platforms: 1 island platform, 1 side platform
- Tracks: 4
- Connections: EGO Bus

Construction
- Structure type: At-grade
- Parking: No
- Accessible: Yes

Other information
- Station code: 2503

History
- Opened: 31 December 1892
- Rebuilt: 2010 (YHT platform); 2018 (Başkentray station)
- Electrified: 1972 (25 kV AC)

Services
Preceding station	TCDD Taşımacılık	Following station
Polatlı towards Istanbul Halkalı	Ankara Express	Ankara Terminus
Polatlı towards İzmir (Basmane)	İzmir Blue Train	Ankara Terminus
Sazpınarı towards Polatlı	Ankara–Polatlı	Ankara Terminus
Terminus	Başkentray	Lale towards Kayaş
Former services
Preceding station	Turkish State Railways	Following station
Polatlı towards Istanbul	Capital Express	Ankara Terminus
Polatlı towards Istanbul	Republic Express	Ankara Terminus
Polatlı towards Istanbul	Fatih Express	Ankara Terminus
Polatlı towards Istanbul	Anatolian Express	Ankara Terminus
Polatlı towards Istanbul	Ankara Express	Ankara Terminus
Malıköy towards Arifiye	Boğaziçi Express	Ankara Terminus
Location

Sincan railway station (Turkish: Sincan istasyonu) is a railway station in Sincan, Ankara and the western terminus of the Başkentray commuter rail line. Prior to the closure of all non-YHT trains within Ankara, the station was an intercity and regional rail station. Between 2009 and 2018, Sincan also served high-speed trains. On 10 January 2018, high-speed YHT trains bypassed Sincan stopping at Lale station instead, until 15 March 2018 and subsequently at Eryaman YHT railway station.
