= Etimesgut =

- District and municipality
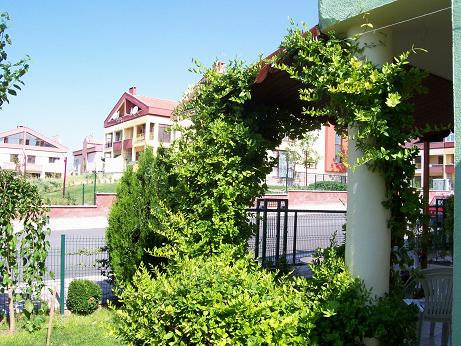
- Eryaman neighborhood in Etimesgut

- Logo

- Map showing Etimesgut District in Ankara Province

- Location within Turkey Location within Turkey Central Anatolia
- Coordinates: 39°56′45″N 32°40′10″E
- Country: Turkey
- Province: Ankara

Government
  - Mayor: Erdal Beşikçioğlu (CHP)
- Area: 273 km^{2} (105 sq mi)
- Elevation: 843 m (2,766 ft)
- Population (2022): 614,891
  - Density: 2,250/km^{2} (5,830/sq mi)
- Time zone: UTC+3 (TRT)
- Postal code: 06790
- Area code: 0312
- Website: www.etimesgut.bel.tr

Etimesgut, formerly Ahimesut, is a municipality and metropolitan district of Ankara Province, Turkey. Its area is 273 km^{2}, and its population is 614,891 (2022). It mainly consists of large public housing projects, 25 km (16 mi) from Ankara city centre. Its elevation is 843 m (2,766 ft).

== Etymology ==
The name Etimesgut derives from the earlier settlement of Ahi Mesud (also rendered Ahimesud), named after the Turkish dervish and Ahi leader Ahi Mesud. Historical sources record the area's name in various forms, including Amaksis, Amaksiz, Amaksus, and Akmasus.

Following the establishment of a model village for Turkish immigrants from the Balkans during the early Republican period, the settlement became known as Etimesut, before the modern spelling Etimesgut was officially adopted in 1937.

== History ==
Archaeological research shows habitation since 2000 BC, including a Phrygian settlement in the 8th century BC. Then of course the district began to share the history of the city of Ankara with its Lydians, Persians, Galatians, Ancient Romans, Byzantines and finally Turks. Etimesgut is on the ancient Silk Road to the orient, and still today the road and railway from Ankara to Istanbul pass through the district.

Atatürk was fond of the area and would come here to ride horses and chat to the locals. He had a room in the building that is the public health laboratory today, and many other public buildings, including the hospital and the post office, that were built by his order still stand today.

Etimesgut began as a housing project of 50 homes ordered by Atatürk in 1924 to accommodate Turkish refugees from Bulgaria. From the 1950s, as poverty forced people to migrate from the countryside into the city much illegal housing gecekondu was thrown up in this district. Some of this has been replaced by public housing projects such as Elvankent, Eryaman and Güzelkent and also military and civil service accommodation. However much gecekondu remains, inhabited by working-class people from cities such as Erzurum, many of whom commute to jobs in the city of Ankara. The Islamic terrorist organisation Hizbullah had a number of hidden cells here in the 1990s.

== Present ==
The area has only the most basic shops and amenities. Almost all of the housing in Etimesgut is apartment buildings except for the Güzelkent project. As building land in the city of Ankara is now impossible to find, areas like this on the fringes of the city, where building land is cheap, are growing faster and faster.

Public buildings include the sugar factory, the Turkish aviation authority headquarters at Etimesgut Airport and a military training camp.

As for places to shop, Etimesgut has a myriad of shopping malls, with one of the latest of them constructed being also one of the biggest and most popular: Metromall AVM. The building is made up of 5 floors, 2 of them being basement floors, and the second basement being a closed car park. The construction of the shopping mall started in 2014 in Eryaman, Etimesgut, and it finished construction officially in 2017. Both the design and the construction of the building was done by "MSA Mimarlık", an architecture company based in Ankara. Today, the shopping mall is one of the most popular shopping malls in Etimesgut, and increased the property value and overall popularity of Eryaman since its construction.

The local football team Etimesgut Şekerspor has a chequered history; in recent years it has gained popularity by hiring former national team player Sergen Yalçın.

== Demographics ==
Historical population
Year	Pop.	±% p.a.
2007	289,601	—
2012	425,947	+8.02%
2017	566,500	+5.87%
2022	614,891	+1.65%
Source: TÜIK (2007-2022)

== Planned security campus ==
The construction of a new building in Etimesgut is underway, to serve as the joint new headquarters of the Turkish National Intelligence Organization (MİT), the Ministry of National Defence, and the Turkish General Staff together with the commands of the Army, Navy and Air Force branches of the Turkish Armed Forces. Reportedly, the move, which will turn the area into a "security campus" comparable to the US Pentagon, is part of measures taken after the failed 2016 Turkish coup d'état attempt.

== Composition ==
There are 38 neighbourhoods in Etimesgut District:

- 30 Ağustos
- Ahi Mesut
- Alsancak
- Altay
- Aşağıyurtçu
- Atakent
- Atayurt
- Ayyıldız
- Bağlıca
- Bahçekapı
- Balıkuyumcu
- Devlet
- Elvan
- Erler
- Eryaman
- Etiler
- Fatih Sultan
- Fevziye
- Göksu
- Güzelkent
- İstasyon
- Kazım Karabekir
- Oğuzlar
- Orhun
- Piyade
- Şehit Osman Avcı
- Şehitali
- Şeker
- Şeyh Şamil
- Süvari
- Topçu
- Tunahan
- Turkuaz
- Yapracık
- Yavuz Selim
- Yeni Bağlıca
- Yeşilova
- Yukarıyurtçu

== Former broadcasting site ==
At Etimesgut, there was a longwave broadcasting station with two masts each 256 metres tall, which worked on 198 kHz. The station, whose masts stood at 39°56′24.07″N 32°40′3.2″E and at 39°56′14.33″N 32°40′3.03″E was built in 1938 and shut-down in 2004 and was afterwards demolished.

== Places of interest ==
- Ankara Aviation Museum

== Image gallery ==
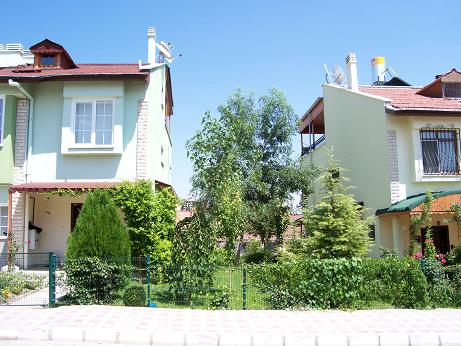
Güzelkent houses

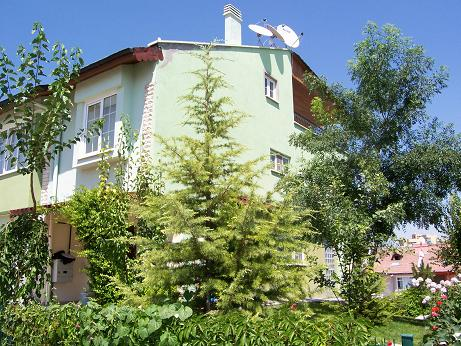
A house in Güzelkent

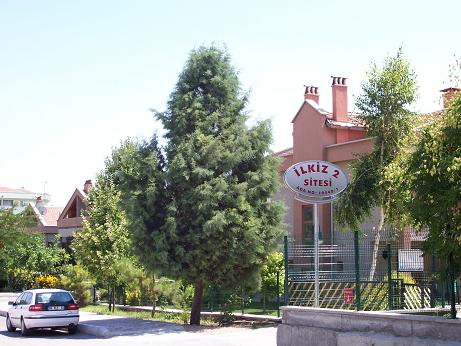
Villas in Güzelkent

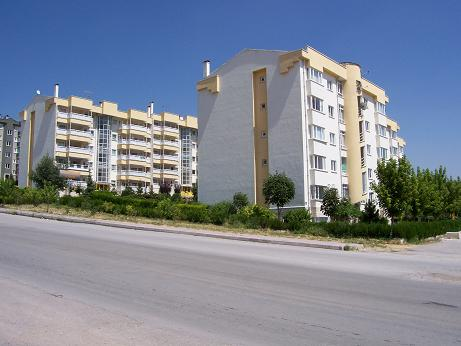
Güzelkent Towers

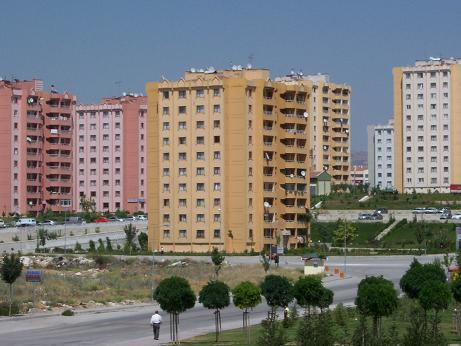
Eryaman housing project
