= New Kangal station =

Railway station in Kangal, Turkey

YENİ KANGAL

General information
- Location: Hastane Cd., Yeni Mah., 58900; Kangal/Sivas; Turkey
- Coordinates: 39.2443°N 37.3900°E
- System: TCDD intercity and regional rail station
- Owner: Turkish State Railways
- Operator: TCDD Taşımacılık
- Line: Lake Van Express Southern Express Eastern Express Sivas–Divriği
- Platforms: 1 side platform
- Tracks: 6

Construction
- Structure type: At-grade
- Parking: Yes

History
- Opened: 2012

Services
Preceding station	TCDD Taşımacılık	Following station
Candoğan towards Ankara	Lake Van Express	Çetinkaya towards Tatvan
Candoğan towards Ankara	Southern Express	Çetinkaya towards Kurtalan
Bostankaya towards Ankara	Eastern Express	Çetinkaya towards Kars
Candoğan towards Sivas	Sivas–Divriği	Çetinkaya towards Divriği
Location

New Kangal station (Turkish: Yeni Kangal istasyonu), also written as Yenikangal, is a railway station in Kangal, Turkey. The station was opened in 2012, along with the 5.4 km (3.4 mi) long Deliktaş Tunnel and the 47.5 km (29.5 mi) long Tecer-Kangal detour, in the eastern Sivas Province.

New Kangal is located on the northern perimeter of the town of Kangal (0.98 km (0.61 mi) north of the town center) compared to Kangal station, which is located near the village of Karanlık (6.9 km (4.3 mi) northeast of the town center.

The station consists of one side platform and one track, with a small freight yard of five tracks adjacent to it. TCDD Taşımacılık operates three daily intercity trains from Ankara (temporarily Irmak) to Kars, Kurtalan, and Tatvan, as well as a twice daily regional train from Sivas to Divriği.
