= Çetinkaya railway station =

Railway station in Turkey

ÇETİNKAYA

General information
- Location: Çetinkaya Bucağı, 58900; Kangal/Sivas; Turkey
- Coordinates: 39.2493°N 37.6078°E
- System: TCDD intercity and regional rail station
- Owner: Turkish State Railways
- Operator: TCDD Taşımacılık
- Line: Lake Van Express Southern Express Eastern Express Sivas–Divriği
- Platforms: 3 (1 side platform, 2 island platforms
- Tracks: 3

Construction
- Structure type: At-grade
- Parking: Yes

History
- Opened: 1936

Services
Preceding station	TCDD Taşımacılık	Following station
Yeni Kangal towards Ankara	Lake Van Express	Demiriz towards Tatvan
Yeni Kangal towards Ankara	Southern Express	Demiriz towards Kurtalan
Yeni Kangal towards Ankara	Eastern Express	Avşar towards Kars
Bostankaya towards Ankara	Eastern Express (Tourist)	Avşar towards Kars
Yeni Kangal towards Sivas	Sivas–Divriği	Avşar towards Divriği
Kangal towards Sivas	Sivas–Divriği	Avşar towards Divriği
Location

Çetinkaya station (Turkish: Çetinkaya garı) is a railway station in Çetinkaya, Turkey. The station is located just west of the Çetinkaya junction, where the Çetinkaya-Malatya railway diverges from the Ankara-Kars railway.

Çetinkaya station was opened in 1936 by the Turkish State Railways.

The station consists of one side platform and two island platforms servicing three tracks, with a small freight yard of six tracks adjacent to it. TCDD Taşımacılık operates three daily intercity trains from Ankara (temporarily Irmak) to Kars, Kurtalan, and Tatvan, as well as a thrice daily regional train from Sivas to Divriği.
