= Kırıkkale railway station =

Main railway station in Kırıkkale, Turkey

KIRIKKALE
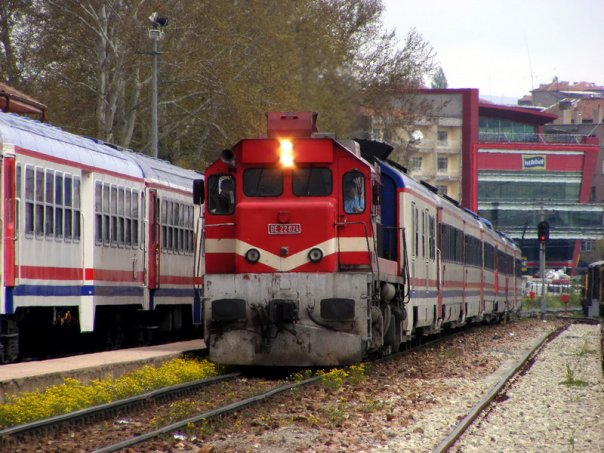
- A westbound train at the station.

General information
- Location: Millet Blv. 103, Fabrikalar Mah., 71100; Kırıkkale Merkez/Kırıkkale; Turkey
- Coordinates: 39.8373°N 33.5032°E
- System: TCDD intercity rail station
- Owner: Turkish State Railways
- Operator: TCDD Taşımacılık
- Line: Eastern Express Lake Van Express Southern Express
- Platforms: 3 (1 side platform, 1 island platform, 1 bay platform)
- Tracks: 3

Construction
- Structure type: At-grade
- Parking: Yes

History
- Opened: 20 November 1925; 100 years ago

Services
Preceding station	TCDD Taşımacılık	Following station
Irmak towards Ankara	Eastern Express	Çerikli towards Kars
Yahşihan towards Ankara	Lake Van Express	Balışıh towards Tatvan
Yahşihan towards Ankara	Southern Express	Balışıh towards Kurtalan
Location

Kırıkkale station (Turkish: Kırıkkale garı) is the main railway station in Kırıkkale, Turkey. The station was originally opened on 20 November 1925 by the Anatolian Baghdad Railways and was one of the first railway stations built by the newly formed Republic of Turkey.

TCDD Taşımacılık operates three daily intercity trains from Ankara to Kars, Kurtalan, and Tatvan, A twice daily regional train from Ankara to Kırıkkale has been suspended since 2016, due to the closure of the railway from Ankara station to Kayaş, to rehabilitate the line for the new Başkentray commuter rail system. Once construction is complete by December 2017, Ankara-Kırıkkale Regional train service is expected to resume.
