= Malatya–Çetinkaya railway =

Railway in Turkey

Malatya-Çetinkaya railway

Overview
- Native name: Malatya-Çetinkaya demiryolu
- Status: Operating
- Owner: Turkish State Railways
- Locale: Eastern Anatolia
- Termini: Malatya, Turkey; Çetinkaya, Turkey

Service
- Type: Heavy rail
- System: Turkish State Railways
- Operator(s): TCDD Taşımacılık; Körfez Ulaştırma

History
- Opened: 16 August 1937

Technical
- Line length: 140 km (87 mi)
- Number of tracks: Single track
- Track gauge: 1,435 mm (4 ft 8 1/2 in) standard gauge
- Loading gauge: 22.5t
- Electrification: 25 kV, 50 Hz
- Operating speed: 120 km/h (75 mph)
- Signalling: CTC

The Malatya–Çetinkaya railway (Turkish: Malatya-Çetinkaya demiryolu) is a 140km junction railway in Turkey, connecting the Adana Malatya Diyarbakir railway and the Ankara Sivas Erzurum Kars railway. This North South line allows for a shorter route from Ankara to Malatya and Diyarbakir. It allows also for shorter access from the north of the country to the Mediterranean ports of Iskenderun and Mersin.

This line was built by the Turkish states railways in 1936 and electrified in 1994. It crosses rugged terrain in the Eastern Anatolia region, sparsely populated and with no industry.

== Infrastructure and Route ==
Starting from Malatya, the railway goes north through a plateau at an average altitude of 800m. From Yazıhan, the line follows closely the Kuruçay river which is a tributary of the Euphrates. Between Yazıhan and Hekimhan, the valley is very narrow, almost like a gorge, and with many meanders. 10 tunnels, for a cumulative length of 2.5 km and several bridges over the river had to be built on this section. After Hekimhan, the valley is wider, and the line will exit the Kuruçay valley after Ulugüney. Near Akgedik, the line enters a pass to reach the valley of Kangal river, another tributary of the Euphrates. This river flows north until it reaches Çetinkaya where it will turn east. The line will follow this river from Demiriz to Çetinkaya.

Malatya-Çetinkaya railway

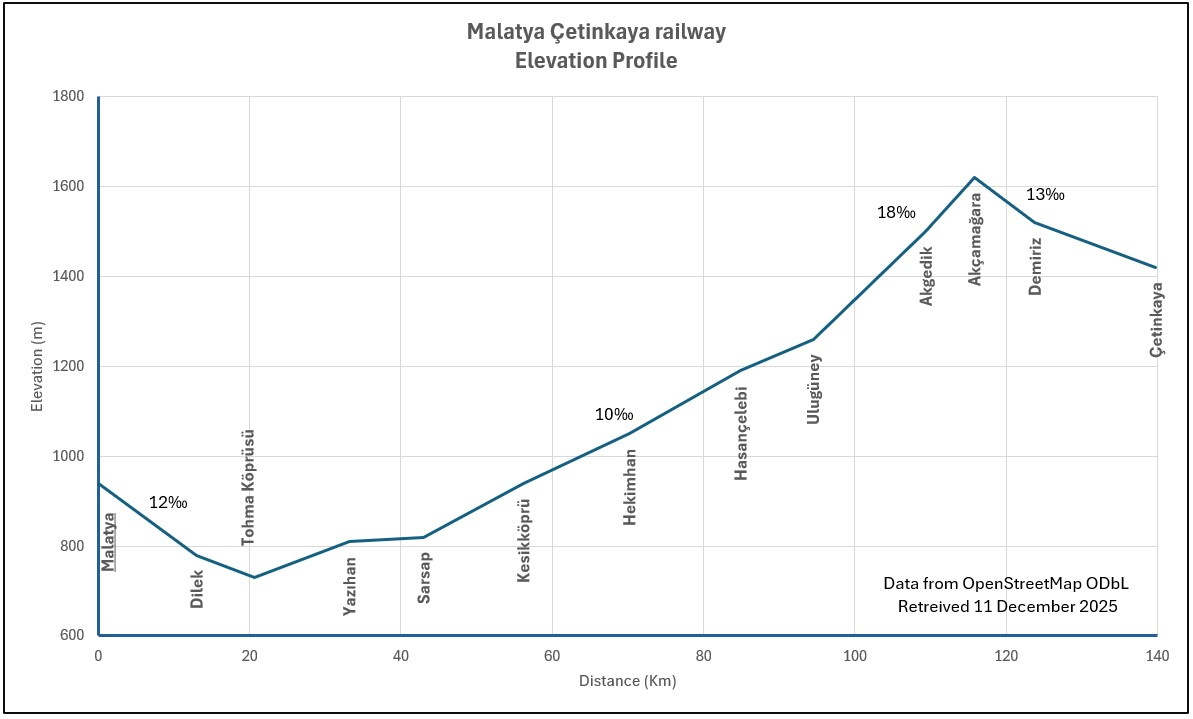
Malatya Cetinkaya railway elevation profile

From Malatya, the line goes down to cross the Tohma Köprüsü at an altitude of 720m. This is the lowest point of the route. From the bridge, it will start climbing to Yazıhan and then to Hekimhan at 1050m. At Ulugüney, the station is at 1260m. then the climb is steeper to Akgedik station which at 1500m altitude. The summit is reached near Akçamağara halt at 1620m. Then the line will ease a bit down until it arrives at Çetinkaya at 1420m altitude.

In total, there are 17 tunnels for a cumulative length of 4.1km. This number includes 3 snow shelters built in concrete to protect the line from drifting snow at high altitude. snow shelter

- Akçamağara: 646m
- Agedik: 280m and 98m

The longuest tunnel is 1003m long and it is located between Sarsap station and Hekimhan station.

The line has several bridges. The most significant is the Tohma Köprüsü, a 517m road and rail bridge. This bridge was inaugurated in 2021 to replace a stretch of the line that is now flooded by the Karakaya Dam reservoir. The next longest bridge is 70m long, across the Kuruçay river, near Kesikköprü station. In all, there are 10 bridges measuring more than 50m.

The line is single track, standard gauge, with passing sidings which are on roughly 15km apart on average. The sidings are in the following stations:

Stations and sidings
Station	Kilometer point	Altitude (m)	number of sidings	Siding length (m)
Dilek	13.0	780	3	600
Yazıhan	33.2	810	3	600
Sarsap	43.0	820	3	600
Kesikköprü	56.2	940	2	600
Hekimhan	70.2	1050	6	600
Hasançelebi	84.9	1190	2	550
Ulugüney	94.5	1260	2	1000
Akgedik	109.4	1500	2	750
Demiriz	123.8	1620	3	1200
Kalkim	132.1	1458	1	800

The line was equipped with TCDD Centralized traffic control signaling and TSI signals . The CTC center is in Malatya.
The line was electrified in 25 kV 50 Hz with overhead catenary in 1994. There are 4 substations converting the 154 kV main grid to 25 kV. These substations are located in:

- Yazıhan
- Hekimhan
- Akgedik
- Çetinkaya

=== Junctions ===
Just before entering Malatya station, there is a triangle junction allowing trains coming either from North or the South to enter the line without reversing. This junction has sidings to park those trains which are bypassing the station and facilities to permit crew changes.

A similar triangle junction layout exist in Çetinkaya station where trains coming from Malatya can either proceed East or West without reversing.

== Traffic ==
The line does not serve any town of importance, nor any industry along its way. The stations are built in agricultural villages and the whole area is very sparsely populated. There is a small mineral loading facility in Hekimhan station.
There is a large mineral loading plant, past Hekimhan, whose entrance turnout is near kilometer point 78. Traffic on this line is therefore through traffic. It consists of freight trains, which are mostly iron ore and intermodal trains, and some long-distance passenger trains from Ankara to Malatya, Diyarbakır, Elazığ, ...
List of long-distance passenger trains:

- 4 Eylül Mavi Treni
- Güney Kurtalan Ekspresi
- Van Gölü Ekspresi

== History ==
The construction of the line was decided by the Grand National Assembly of Turkey law of 29 June 1933. The line was built by TCDD and it was inaugurated in two sections:

- Malatya to Hekimhan: 1936
- Hekimhan to Çetinkaya: 16 August 1937
