= Irmak railway station =

Railway station in Irmak, Turkey

IRMAK
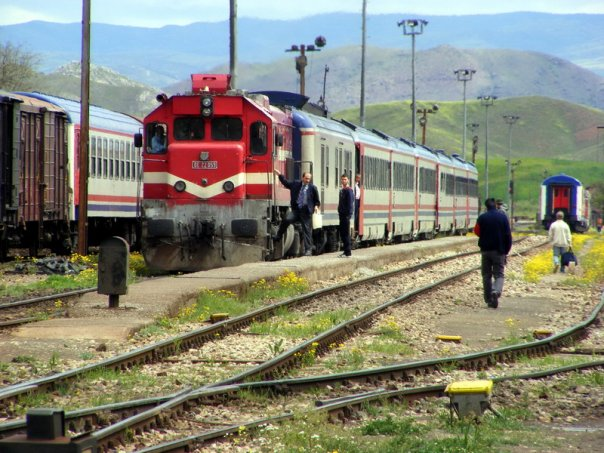
- A westbound train at Irmak in 2009.

General information
- Location: Melih Gökçek Cd., Irmak Köyü, 71450; Yahşihan/Kırıkkale; Turkey
- Coordinates: 39.9318°N 33.3901°E
- System: TCDD Taşımacılık intercity rail station
- Owner: Turkish State Railways
- Operator: TCDD Taşımacılık
- Line: Eastern Express Lake Van Express Southern Express
- Platforms: 2 (1 side platform, 1 island platform)
- Tracks: 3

Construction
- Structure type: At-grade
- Parking: Yes

History
- Opened: 1 April 1934; 92 years ago
- Electrified: 2016; 10 years ago 25 kV AC, 60 Hz

Services
Preceding station	TCDD Taşımacılık	Following station
Kayaş towards Ankara	Eastern Express (Tourist)	Yerköy towards Kars
Elmadağ towards Ankara	Eastern Express	Kırıkkale towards Kars
Elmadağ towards Ankara	Lake Van Express	Yahşihan towards Tatvan
Elmadağ towards Ankara	Southern Express	Yahşihan towards Kurtalan
Location

Irmak station is a railway station in Irmak, Turkey. TCDD Taşımacılık operates three daily intercity trains from Ankara to Kars, Kurtalan, and Tatvan.

During the expansion of the existing railway within Ankara, Irmak served as the temporary western terminus if these three trains from 2016 until 4 June 2018.

Irmak station was opened on 1 April 1934 by the Turkish State Railways.
