= Çerikli railway station =

Railway station in Çerikli, Turkey

ÇERİKLİ

General information
- Location: Yerlikent Mah. 71700; Çerikli, Kırıkkale; Turkey
- Coordinates: 39.8913°N 33.9997°E
- System: TCDD intercity rail station
- Owner: Turkish State Railways
- Operator: TCDD Taşımacılık
- Line: Eastern Express Lake Van Express Southern Express
- Platforms: 2 island platforms
- Tracks: 3

Construction
- Structure type: At-grade
- Parking: Yes

History
- Opened: 20 November 1925; 100 years ago

Services
Preceding station	TCDD Taşımacılık	Following station
Kırıkkale towards Ankara	Eastern Express	Yerköy towards Kars
Balışıh towards Ankara	Lake Van Express	Sekili towards Tatvan
Balışıh towards Ankara	Southern Express	Sekili towards Kurtalan
Location

Çerikli railway station (Turkish: Çerikli istasyonu) is a railway station in Çerikli, Turkey. The station was originally opened on 20 November 1925 by the Anatolian—Baghdad Railways and was one of the first railway stations built by the newly formed Republic of Turkey.

TCDD Taşımacılık operates three daily intercity trains from Ankara; the Doğu Express to Kars, the Southern Express to Kurtalan and the Van Lake Express to and Tatvan. The latter two operate as a single train until Yolçatı.
