= Sivas railway station =

Main railway station in Sivas, Turkey

Sivas
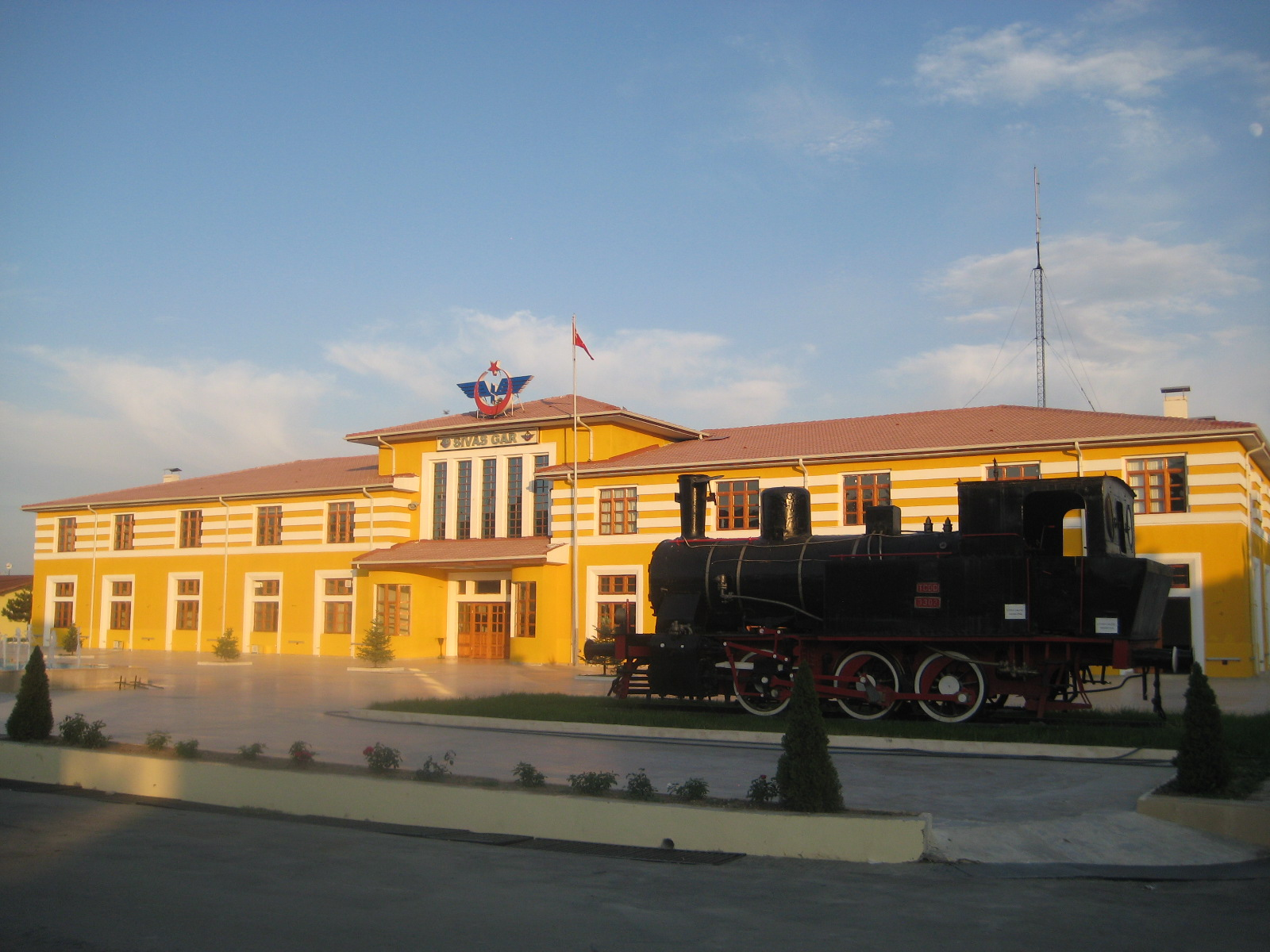
- Sivas railway station (2012)

General information
- Location: Kadı Burhanettin Mah. Rahmi Günay Cad. Sivas; Turkey
- Coordinates: 39°44′23″N 37°00′21″E
- System: TCDD intercity and regional rail station
- Owner: Turkish State Railways
- Lines: Ankara-Kars railway Ankara-Sivas high-speed railway
- Platforms: 3 (1 side platform, 2 island platforms
- Tracks: 5
- Connections: Sivas Belediye Otobüs: 1A, 1D, 2B, 3A, 8A

Construction
- Parking: Located in front of the building
- Architectural style: Turkish Neoclassical, Art Deco

History
- Opened: 31 August 1930

Services
Preceding station	TCDD Taşımacılık	Following station
Yıldızeli YHT towards Ankara	Yüksek Hızlı Tren	Terminus
Kalın towards Ankara	Eastern Express	Bostankaya towards Kars
Yapı towards Ankara	Lake Van Express	Taşlıdere towards Tatvan
Yapı towards Ankara	Southern Express	Taşlıdere towards Kurtalan
Terminus	Sivas–Divriği	Taşlıdere towards Divriği
Location
- Location within Turkey

Sivas railway station (Turkish: Sivas garı) is the main railway station in Sivas, Turkey. Located just southwest of the city center, the station is serviced by three inter-city trains from Ankara, which continue east to Kars, Tatvan and Kurtalan respectively. The old part of the station serves the Kalın-Samsun railway and there is a regional train to Divriği.

The station was opened in 1930 but the building wasn't completed until 1934. The rectangular plan building has a basement, a ground floor and an upper floor. There are two main gates one in the south and one in the north. It is registered as a cultural asset of the city.

There is a new part of the station from which the Ankara–Sivas high-speed railway runs. As of October 2023 there is no left luggage anywhere in the station.

== See also ==
- Malatya station
- Manisa station
- Diyarbakır station
