= Yahşihan railway station =

Railway station in Yahşihan, Turkey

YAHŞİHAN

General information
- Location: Kadıoğlu Mah. 71540; Yahşihan, Kırıkkale; Turkey
- Coordinates: 39.8455°N 33.4475°E
- System: TCDD intercity rail station
- Owner: Turkish State Railways
- Operator: TCDD Taşımacılık
- Line: Lake Van Express Southern Express
- Platforms: 1 side platform
- Tracks: 3

Construction
- Structure type: At-grade
- Parking: Yes

History
- Opened: 1962; 64 years ago

Services
| Preceding station | TCDD Taşımacılık | Following station |
|---|---|---|
| Irmak towards Ankara | Lake Van Express | Kırıkkale towards Tatvan |
| Irmak towards Ankara | Southern Express | Kırıkkale towards Kurtalan |
Location

Yahşihan railway station (Turkish: Yahşihan istasyonu) is a railway station in Yahşihan, Turkey, just west of Kırıkkale. The station was built in 1924 and opened on 20 November 1925 by the Anatolian—Baghdad Railways and was one of the first railway stations built by the newly formed Republic of Turkey.

TCDD Taşımacılık operates three daily intercity trains from Ankara to Kars, Kurtalan, and Tatvan, Regional train service between Ankara and Kırıkkale was suspended in 2016, due to the construction of the Başkentray commuter rail project. When completed in mid-April 2018, regional rail service is expected to return.
