= Balışıh railway station =

Railway station in Balışeyh, Turkey

BALIŞIH

General information
- Location: Oba Mah. 71520; Balışeyh, Kırıkkale; Turkey
- Coordinates: 39.9088°N 33.7204°E
- System: TCDD intercity rail station
- Owner: Turkish State Railways
- Operator: TCDD Taşımacılık
- Line: Lake Van Express Southern Express
- Platforms: 1 side platform
- Tracks: 3

Construction
- Structure type: At-grade
- Parking: Yes

History
- Opened: 20 November 1925; 100 years ago

Services
Preceding station	TCDD Taşımacılık	Following station
Kırıkkale towards Ankara	Lake Van Express	Çerikli towards Tatvan
Kırıkkale towards Ankara	Southern Express	Çerikli towards Kurtalan
Location

Balışıh railway station (Turkish: Balışıh istasyonu) is a railway station in Balışeyh, Turkey. The station was originally opened on 20 November 1925 by the Anatolian—Baghdad Railways and was one of the first railway stations built by the newly formed Republic of Turkey.

TCDD Taşımacılık operates two daily intercity trains from Ankara to Kurtalan, and Tatvan,
