= Çetinkaya =

Çetinkaya (IPA: [tʃeˈtiːnˈkaˈja]) is a Turkish surname. In English 'çetin' means 'hard' and 'kaya' means 'rock'.

== Notable people with the surname include ==
- Ali Çetinkaya (1878–1949), Turkish Army officer
- Burcu Çetinkaya (born 1981), Turkish female rally driver and television representer
- Duygu Çetinkaya, Actress
- Hasan Çetinkaya, Swedish footballer
- Haydar Çetinkaya (born 1976), Turkish para-Nordic skier
- Hikmet Çetinkaya, Cumhuriyet newspaper author
- Hilal Çetinkaya (born 1997), Turkish footballer
- Kelime Çetinkaya (born 1982), Turkish female cross country skier
- Meral Çetinkaya (born 1945), Turkish film actress
- Murat Çetinkaya (born 1976), Governor of the Central Bank of Turkey
- Necati Çetinkaya (born 1943), Member of Parliament
- Olcay Çetinkaya (born 1979), Turkish footballer

== Other uses ==
- Afyon Ali Çetinkaya railway station, a railway station in Afyonkarahisar, Turkey
- Çetinkaya, Sivas, a village in the Kangal district of the Sivas Province
  - Çetinkaya station, a railway station in the village.
- Çetinkaya Türk S.K., Turkish Cypriot football club
