= Kangal (disambiguation) =

Kangal is a town and a district of Sivas Province in Turkey.

Kangal may also refer to:

- Kangal District, Turkey, the district in which Kangal sits
  - New Kangal station
  - Kangal power station
- Kangal Shepherd Dog, a breed of dog
- Kangal (film), a 1953 Indian Tamil-language film
- Kangal Harinath (1833-1896), Bengali journalist, poet and Baul singer

== See also ==
- Kangalli station, a railway station in North Korea
