= Touristic Eastern Express =

Railway line in Turkey

Overview
- Service type: Scenic Inter-city rail
- Status: Operating
- Locale: North-Central, Central, North-Eastern Anatolia
- First service: May 29, 2019; 7 years ago
- Current operator: TCDD Taşımacılık
- Former operator: Turkish State Railways

Route
- Termini: Ankara railway station Kars railway station
- Stops: 27 (short), 2 (long)
- Distance travelled: 1,365 km (848 mi)
- Average journey time: 32 hours
- Service frequency: Three times a week

On-board services
- Sleeping arrangements: 6 Sleeping cars
- Catering facilities: 1 Dining car

Technical
- Rolling stock: TVS2000
- Track gauge: 1,435 mm (4 ft 8 1/2 in)
- Track owner: Turkish State Railways (TCDD)

The Touristic Eastern Express (Turkish: Turistik Doğu Ekspresi) is a scenic passenger train operated by the TCDD Taşımacılık. The train runs from December to March eastward 1,365 km (848 mi) from Ankara railway station to Kars railway station. The train service debuted on 29 May 2019 with an official ceremony attended by government ministers. The service was established as an alternative to the regular Eastern Express, which runs the same line but was mostly sold-out weeks in advance in recent years for sightseeing purposes.

== Overview ==
The Touristic Eastern Express departs from Ankara at 16:55 hours and arrives in Kars after 32 hours. Departure time in Kars is at 23:55 hours. It leaves Ankara on Mondays, Wednesdays and Fridays, and return from Kars is on Wednesdays, Fridays or Sundays. The train with nine cars, including six sleeping cars, one dining car, and two service cars, and has a capacity of 120 passengers. This train services suspended between 28 March 2020-15 December 2021 due the COVID-19 pandemic. On 15 December 2021, train restarted the operations from Ankara with a ceremony attended by Adil Karaismailoğlu, the Minister of Transport and Infrastructure.

== Sightseeing stops ==
The train stops in the İliç town of Erzincan Province and Erzurum on the way from Ankara to Kars. On the return journey from Kars, it stops at the Divriği railway station and Bostankaya, both in Sivas Province. Touristic excursions organized by the TCDD are offered to passengers during the two- to three-hour train stops. At the train stop in İliç, passengers are taken by bus to Kemaliye for a visit to the Karanlık Canyon and then to the water source of Lake Kadı, as well as to the historic wooden mansions. A boat ride on the reservoir of Bağıştaş 1 Dam in İliç is also offered. The passengers then travel by bus to Erzincan, where they visit the Ekşisu Picnic Area, the archaeological site of Altıntepe, and the Gürlevik Waterfalls. Outdoor recreational activities such as paragliding, rafting, and safari are offered.

During a three-hour train stop in Erzurum, passengers are taken on a sightseeing tour by bus, visiting historic buildings such as the Rüstem Pasha Caravanserai (Taşhan), Erzurum Congress building, and Çifte Minareli Medrese. Tourist attractions visited on the way from Kars to Ankara are the Grand Mosque and Hospital in Divriği and Gök Medrese, the Grand Mosque of Sivas, Buruciye Medrese, and Çifte Minareli Medrese in Sivas.

== Tickets ==
Tickets are priced at ₺ 1300 (approx. US$ 110) for a single-bed compartment.

All-inclusive onwards-and-return tour is priced at ₺ 2600 per person.
