= Malatya railway station =

Main railway station in the city of Malatya, Turkey

MALATYA
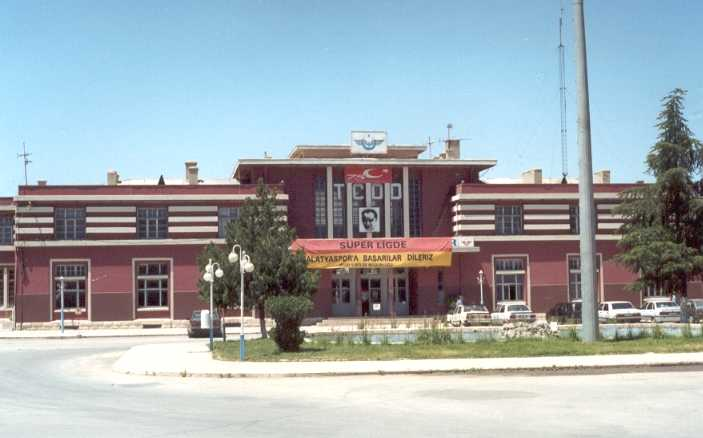
- The Art Deco station building in June 2001.

General information
- Location: İstasyon Cd. 1, İnönü Mah. 44070; Yeşilyurt/Malatya; Turkey
- Coordinates: 38.3523°N 38.2833°E
- System: TCDD intercity rail station
- Owner: Turkish State Railways
- Operator: TCDD Taşımacılık
- Line: Lake Van Express Southern Express Euphrates Express
- Platforms: 2 (1 side platform, 1 island platform)
- Tracks: 3

Construction
- Structure type: At-grade
- Parking: Located in front of station building.
- Architectural style: Art Deco

History
- Opened: 15 March 1931

Services
Preceding station	TCDD Taşımacılık	Following station
Dilek towards Ankara	Lake Van Express	Battalgazi towards Tatvan
Dilek towards Ankara	Southern Express	Battalgazi towards Kurtalan
Yazlak towards Adana	Euphrates Express	Battalgazi towards Elazığ
Location

Malatya railway station is the main railway station in the city of Malatya, Turkey. The station was built in 1931 by the Turkish State Railways as part of the railway to Diyarbakır. TCDD Taşımacılık operates three trains through the station: the Lake Van Express to Ankara or Tatvan, the Southern Express to Ankara or Kurtalan and the Euphrates Express to Elazığ or Adana.

The station building was built in the Art deco style and is similar to the station buildings of Sivas, Manisa and Diyarbakır stations.

Malatya station also houses the TCDD regional headquarters for District 5.

== See also ==
- Sivas station
- Manisa station
- Diyarbakır station
