= Diyarbakır railway station =

Main railway station in the city of Diyarbakır, Turkey

DİYARBAKIR
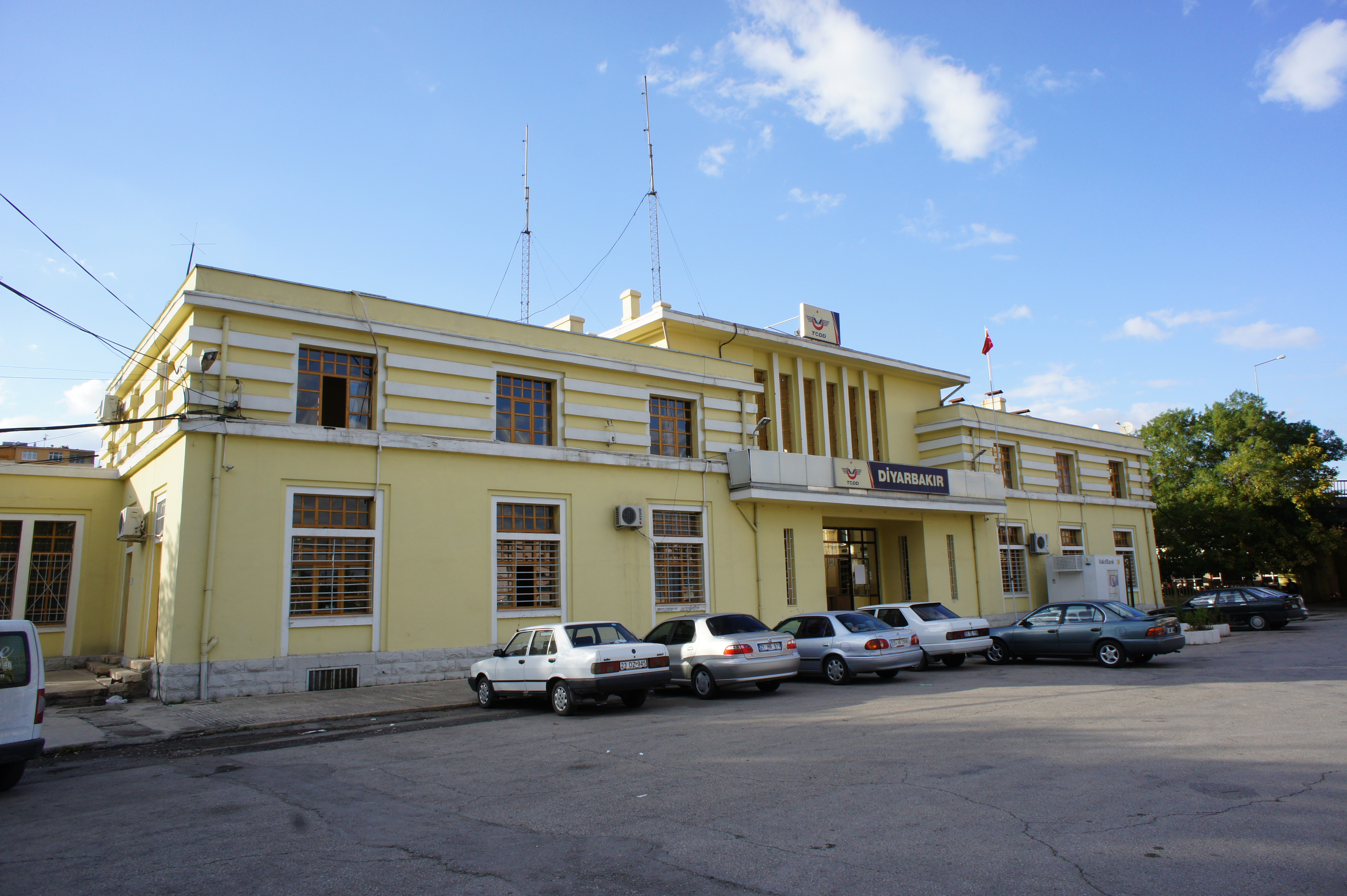
- The Art Deco station building in 2010.

General information
- Location: İstasyon Cd., Şehitlik Mah. 21010; Yenişehir/Diyarbakır; Turkey
- Coordinates: 37.9136°N 40.2160°E
- System: TCDD intercity and regional rail station
- Owner: Turkish State Railways
- Operator: TCDD Taşımacılık
- Line: Southern Express Diyarbakır–Batman
- Platforms: 2 (1 side platform, 1 island platform)
- Tracks: 3

Construction
- Structure type: At-grade
- Parking: Located in front of station building.
- Architectural style: Art Deco

History
- Opened: November 1935

Services
Preceding station	TCDD Taşımacılık	Following station
Geyik towards Ankara	Southern Express	Ulam towards Kurtalan
Terminus	Diyarbakır–Batman	Bozdemir towards Batman
Location

Diyarbakır railway station (Turkish: Diyarbakır garı) is the main railway station in the city of Diyarbakır, Turkey. TCDD Taşımacılık operates the Southern Kurtalan Express to Ankara or Kurtalan and a daily regional train to Batman.

The station was built by the Turkish State Railways in 1935 as part of the railway from Fevzipaşa. The station building was built in the Art Deco style, similar to the station buildings of Sivas, Manisa and Malatya.

Diyarbakır station consists of one side platform and one island platform serving three tracks. A freight yard is also present on the station grounds.

== See also ==
- Sivas station
- Malatya station
- Manisa station
