= Karaurgan railway station =

Railway station in Kars, Turkey

KARAURGAN

General information
- Coordinates: 40.2509°N 42.2785°E
- Owner: Turkish State Railways
- Line: Eastern Express
- Platforms: 1
- Tracks: 1

Construction
- Structure type: At-grade

Other information
- Status: In Operation
- Station code: 4

History
- Opened: 1962; 64 years ago

Services
| Preceding station | TCDD Taşımacılık | Following station |
|---|---|---|
| Süngütaşı towards Ankara | Eastern Express | Topdağ towards Kars |
Location

Karaurgan is a flag stop near the village of Karaurgan in the Kars Province of Turkey. The Eastern Express services the station, operated by the Turkish State Railways, between Istanbul and Kars.
