= Topdağ railway station =

Railway station in Turkey

TOPDAĞ

General information
- Coordinates: 40.184093°N 42.180779°E
- Owner: TCDD
- Line: Eastern Express
- Platforms: 2
- Tracks: 2

Construction
- Structure type: At-grade

Other information
- Status: In Operation
- Station code: 4669

History
- Opened: 1916; 110 years ago
- Rebuilt: 1962; 64 years ago

Services
Preceding station	TCDD Taşımacılık	Following station
Karaurgan towards Ankara	Eastern Express	Sarıkamış towards Kars
Location

Topdağ Railway Station is a railway station in the village of Topdağ in the Kars Province of Turkey. The station is serviced by the Eastern Express, operated by the Turkish State Railways, running between Istanbul and Kars.
