= Süngütaşı railway station =

Railway station in Turkey

SÜNGÜTAŞI

General information
- Coordinates: 40.135943°N 42.160062°E
- Owner: TCDD
- Line: Eastern Express
- Platforms: 1
- Tracks: 1

Construction
- Structure type: At-grade

Other information
- Status: In Operation
- Station code: 4645

History
- Opened: 1916; 110 years ago
- Rebuilt: 1962; 64 years ago

Services
Preceding station	TCDD Taşımacılık	Following station
Horasan towards Ankara	Eastern Express	Karaurgan towards Kars
Location

Süngütaşı station is a railway station in the village of Süngütaşı in the Kars Province of Turkey. The station is serviced by the Eastern Express, operated by the Turkish State Railways, running between Istanbul and Kars. The station is the westernmost station in the province.
