= Mercan =

Turkish word meaning "coral"

Mercan is a Turkish word meaning "coral". It is a Turkish given name for females as well as a surname, and may refer to:

== Given name ==
- Mercan Erzincan (born 1976), Turkish folk singer and musician

== Surname ==
- Faruk Mercan (born 1971), Turkish journalist and writer
- Hasan Murat Mercan (born 1959), Turkish politician and diplomat
- Levent Mercan (born 2000), German footballer
- Neşe Mercan (born 1994), Turkish Paralympian goalball player

== Pseudonym ==
- Mercan Dede (born 1966), Turkish-Canadian male composer, ney and bendir player (pseudonym for Arkın Ilıcalı)

== Places ==
- Mercan, Adaklı, a Kurdish settlement in the Bingöl Province, Turkey
- Mercan, Keşan, a village in the Edirne Province, Turkey
- Mercan, Tercan, a municipality in the Erzincan Province, Turkey
