= Selim railway station =

Railway station in Turkey

SELİM

General information
- Coordinates: 40.280663°N 42.470587°E
- Owner: TCDD
- Line: Eastern Express
- Platforms: 1
- Tracks: 1

Construction
- Structure type: At-grade

Other information
- Status: In Operation
- Station code: 4640

History
- Opened: 1913; 113 years ago
- Rebuilt: 1962; 64 years ago

Services
Preceding station	TCDD Taşımacılık	Following station
Sarıkamış towards Ankara	Eastern Express	Kars Terminus
Location

Selim station (Turkish: Selim garı) is a railway station in the town of Selim, Turkey. The station is served by the Eastern Express, operated by the Turkish State Railways from Istanbul to Kars.
