= Kuzyaka =

Kuzyaka (literally "shady side" in Turkish) may refer to the following places in Turkey:

- Kuzyaka, Alanya, a village in the district of Alanya, Antalya Province
- Kuzyaka, Kangal, a village in the district of Kangal, Sivas Province
