= 2019 in rail transport =

This article lists events related to rail transport that occurred in 2019.

== Events ==
=== January ===
- (Denmark) January 2 – Great Belt Bridge train accident: A DSB passenger train hits a semi-trailer from a freight train in a storm on the Great Belt Fixed Link, killing 8.
- (South Africa) January 8 – Mountain View train collision: Two passenger trains collide at Mountain View station in Pretoria, killing at least 4 and injuring at least 620.
- (United States) January 10 – TEXRail commences regular revenue service. A January 4 opening was suspended due to signal issues identified during an inspection less than 12 hours before service was scheduled to begin.
- (United States) January 26 – Los Angeles Metro Rail Blue Line Improvements Project begins, which upgrades signalling and infrastructure on large sections of the line with closures of up to eight months. The line resumes normal operation on November 2, but rechristened as the A Line.

=== February ===
- (United States) February 11 – After a 15 year hiatus, the BART SFO–Millbrae line restarts weekday operations, reestablishing a one-seat ride between Caltrain and San Francisco International Airport.
- (India) February 15 – Vande Bharat Express is inaugurated for public service.

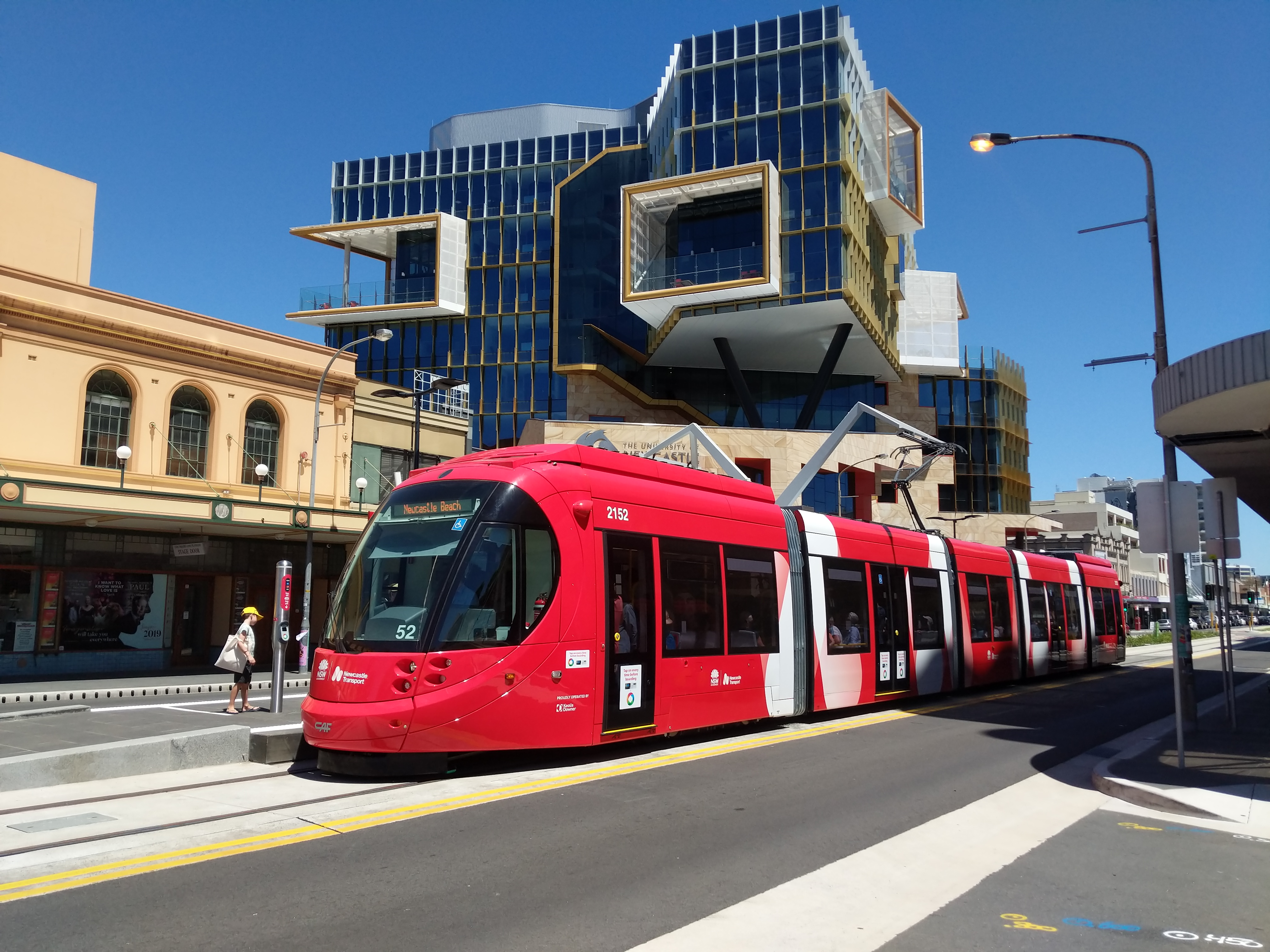
Newcastle Light Rail on opening day, 17 February 2019

- (Australia) February 17 – Newcastle Light Rail in Newcastle, New South Wales, is opened.
- (United States) February 25 – Wabtec and GE Transportation are formally merged to become a global leader in railroad manufacturing and specializing in railroad-related services.
- (Egypt) February 27 – Ramses Station rail disaster: An Egyptian National Railways train buffer stop collision and subsequent fire kills at least 25 people at Ramses Station in Cairo.

=== March ===
- (United States) March 2 – All Amtrak California Pacific Surfliner EMD F59PHI units leave from service to Metra in Chicago
- (India) March 8 – Nagpur Metro's orange line began service.
- March 24 – Opening of Jakarta MRT Phase 1, the first rapid transit system in Indonesia.
- (Japan) March 29 – JR East phases out 183 series.

=== April ===
- (China) April 10 – Harbin Metro Line 1 was extended south to Xinjiang Street.
- April 20 – Light rail in Canberra starts operations; it is the second new light railway to be opened in Australia in 2019 (after the Newcastle Light Rail).
- (Cambodia) (Thailand) April 22 – Ceremony to mark work on reinstating the rail link across the Cambodian–Thai border between Aranyaprathet and Poipet.
- April 25
  - – Panama Metro Line 2 begins service in Panama City.
  - (United States) – Phoenix Valley Metro Rail opens an infill station at 50th Street/Washington.
- (United States) April 26 – Opening of the FasTracks commuter rail G Line in Denver, Colorado, originally estimated to open in late 2016.

=== May ===
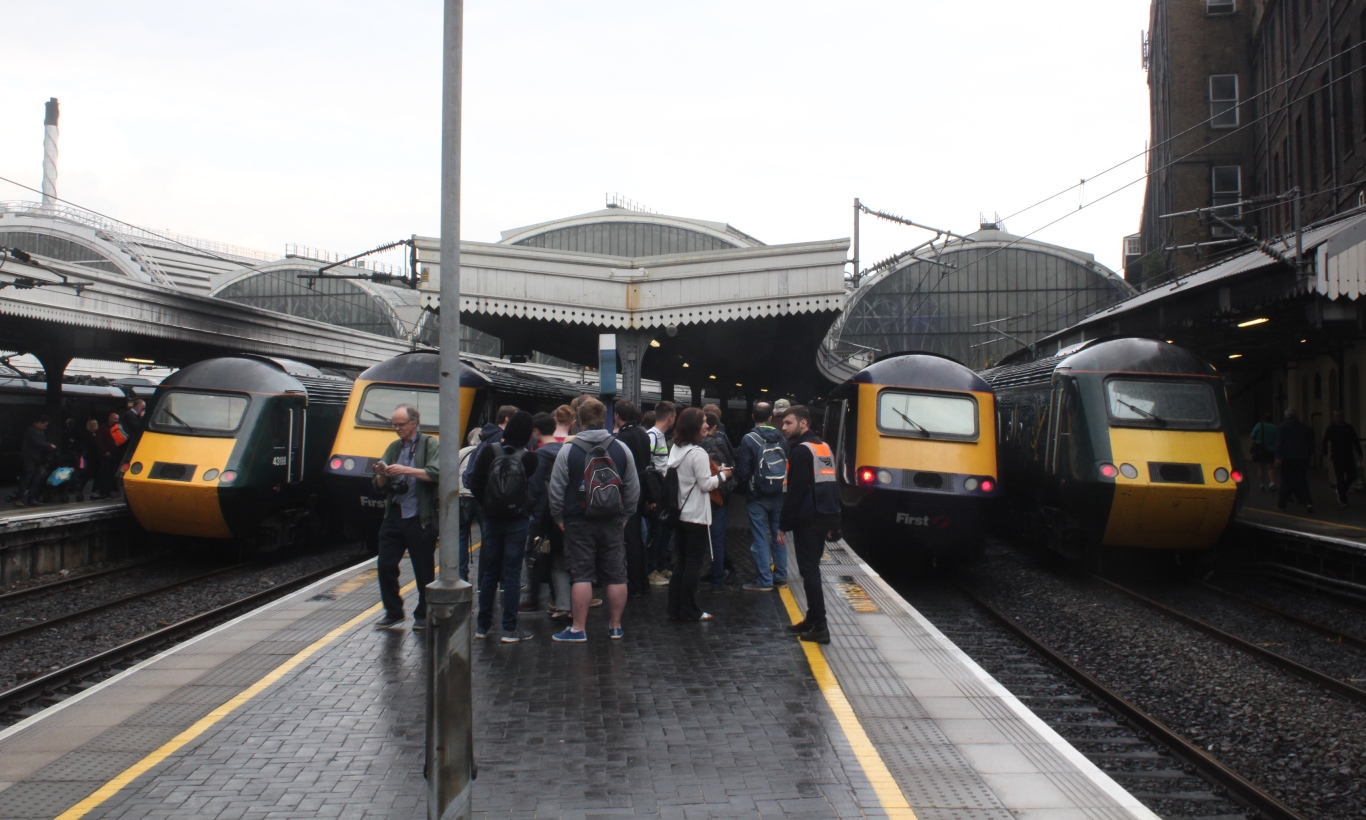
The last InterCity 125 trains about to leave London Paddington station on 18 May 2019

- May 1
  - (United States) – Union Pacific 4014 moves under its own steam for the first time in more than 59 years, at Cheyenne, Wyoming.
  - (Philippines) – Manila MRT Line 3 begins an upgrading and rehabilitation project.
- (Qatar) May 8 - Doha Metro opened.
- (Japan) May 9 – The first ALFA-X train set is shown to the public. The driving coach has a 22 meters-length "duck-shaped" front end. This train set is being tested at 360–400 km/h.
- May 18
  - (United States) – Opening of Valley Metro Rail Gilbert Road Extension in Mesa, Arizona.
  - (United Kingdom) – The last full-length Great Western Railway InterCity 125 trains leave London Paddington station, the final service being the 18.30 to Taunton and Exeter (the same set briefly returns to Paddington on June 1 as part of the 'Flying Banana' farewell tour across the GWR network before going off-lease).
- (United States) May 19 – Opening of Denver RTD Light Rail Southeast Rail Extension to RidgeGate.
- (Azerbaijan) May 21 – Baku suburban railway circle line is opened.
- May 26 – Sydney Metro Northwest, Australia's first dedicated rapid transit line, commences operations.
- (Turkey) May 29 – Touristic Eastern Express inaugurated by Turkish State Railways.
- (Denmark) May 31 – Copenhagen–Ringsted Line starts operation.

=== June ===
- (United States) June 3 – Charlotte's CityLynx Gold Line ceases operation for upgrades to the line, which include new rolling stock, raised platforms at stops to accommodate level boarding, and extensions to the north and south with 11 new stations. A Rail replacement bus service is offered in the interim.
- June 9 – Go-Ahead Germany commences operating.
- (United States) June 11 – A train on the MBTA Red Line derails near JFK/UMass station in Boston, Massachusetts due to a fractured axle. Delays and unusual transfer patterns persist along the line for months following the incident.

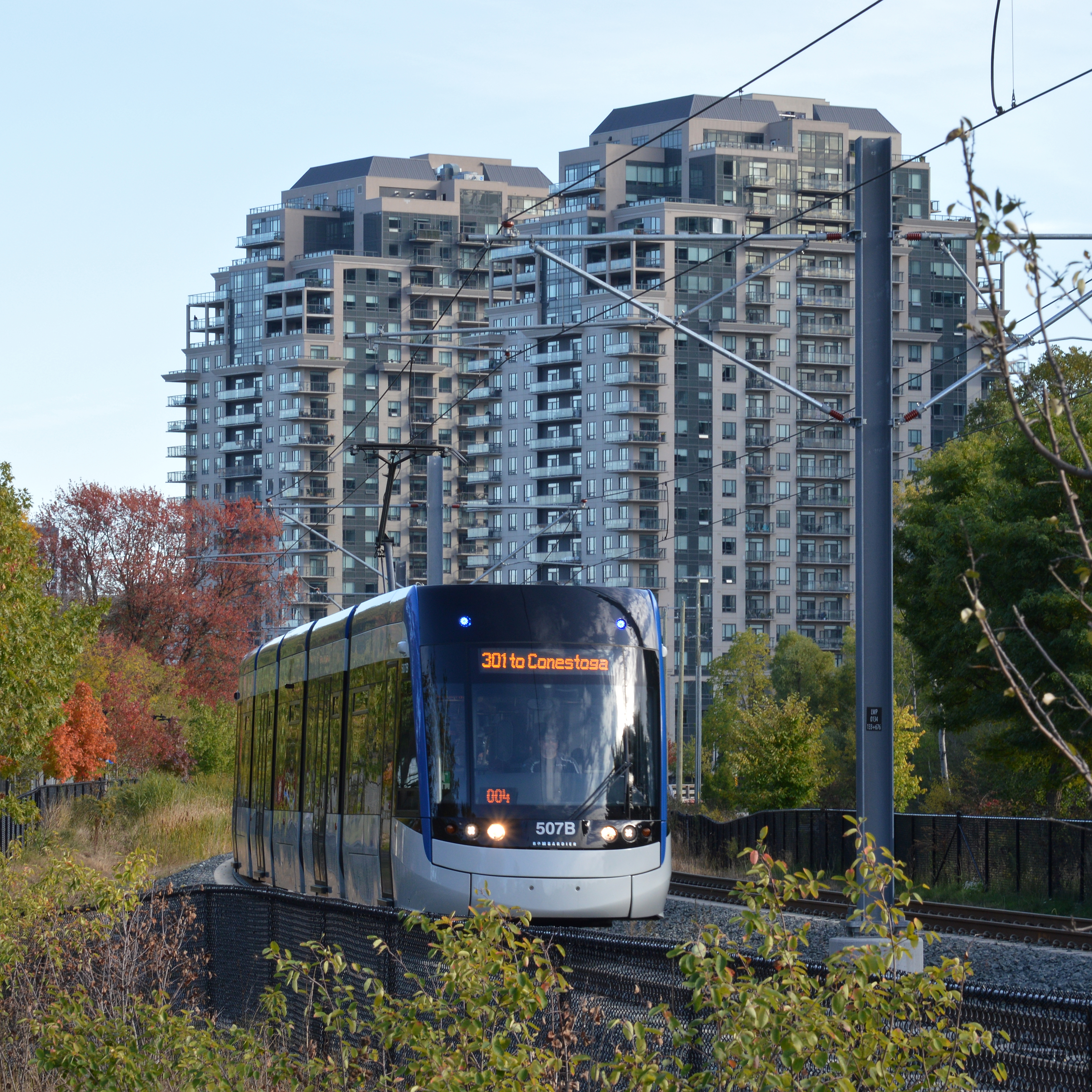
Ion rapid transit Flexity Freedom in Waterloo, Ontario, October 2019

- (Canada) June 21 – Opening of Ion rapid transit LRT.
- (China) June 23 – Opening of Lanzhou Metro.
- (Australia) June 28 – Sydney Trains retires its last S set electric multiple units.
- (United Kingdom) June 30 – East Midlands franchise orders bi-mode trains, designated British Rail Class 810.

=== July ===
- (Pakistan) July 11 – Sadiqabad Railway Accident.
- (France) July 27 – Re-opening of Caen tramway.

=== August ===
- August – Indian Railways introduces India's first bi-mode locomotive, the WDAP-5.
- (England) August 18 – East Midlands franchise passes from East Midlands Trains to East Midlands Railway.
- (United States) August 26 – The Black Mesa and Lake Powell Railroad, one of America’s few electric freight railroads, closes.

=== September ===
- (Switzerland) September 2 – Limmattal light rail line phase 1 opens over 2.9 kilometres (1.8 mi) of track with seven stops.
- (United States) September 7 – Altamont Corridor Express begins weekend service.
- (Canada) September 14 – The Confederation Line opens as part of the O-Train network in Ottawa, Ontario.
- September 28
  - (Denmark) – The City Circle Line of the Copenhagen Metro opens.
  - (South Korea) – Gimpo Goldline opens in Seoul.
  - (China) – Harbin Metro Line 3 opened one infill station.
- (Netherlands) September 30 – Schiedam–Hoek van Holland railway conversion into subway line, after several delays.

=== October ===
- October 3 – 'Soft launch' of Metro Express (Mauritius) light rail system, Phase 1, the first passenger rail transport on the island since 1956.
- (Japan) October 12 – Typhoon Hagibis results in flood, damaging ten trains of Hokuriku Shinkansen stored at Nagano City.
- October 18 – 2019 Santiago protests: After a week of fare-dodging protests following a fare increase on the Santiago Metro, thousands of protestors clash with police across Santiago in Chile and subway service is suspended in the entire city; these events trigger more widespread protests including damage to subway stations.
- (Russia) October 25 – Line 11 of Moscow metro is temporarily closed until becoming part of the Moscow Central Diameter.
- (United States) October 28–31 – Sonoma–Marin Area Rail Transit services are cancelled on October 28 and 29 due to the preemptive 2019 California power shutoffs affecting crossings throughout the system. Partial service as far north as Downtown Santa Rosa is restored on the 30th and full service resume the following day. Free rides are offered from October 30 until November 6 to provide transportation alternatives following the Kincade Fire.
- (Brazil) October 30 – Line 3 of the Rio de Janeiro Light Rail is completed, opening for revenue service and completing the initial system.
- October 31 – 2019 Pakistan train fire: A Pakistan Railways Tezgam express on the Karachi–Peshawar Line catches fire at Liaquatpur Tehsil in Punjab, Pakistan, killing at least 74 people; early reports blame the blaze on the illegal use of portable stoves by passengers cooking on board.

=== November ===
- (European Union) (Turkey) November 8 – China–Europe freight trains through subsea Marmaray tunnel.
- (Bangladesh) November 12 – Mondobhag train collision
- (Russia) November 21 – Opening of the first line of Moscow Central Diameters network in Moscow. Some lines that were previously located independently are connected.

=== December ===
- (Indonesia) December 1 – The first phase of the Jakarta LRT, from Velodrome to Pegangsaan Dua, begins commercial operations
- (Australia) December 6 – The Great Southern long-distance passenger train begins regular service between Adelaide and Brisbane.
- December 8
  - (China) – Shenzhen Metro Line 9 extended to Qianwan from Hongshuwan.
  - (Estonia) – Operations to Turba restored after being ceased in 2004.
  - (United Kingdom) – Avanti West Coast commences operating the West Coast Partnership.
- December 14
  - (Australia) – Opening of the Randwick branch of the CBD and South East Light Rail, the second light rail line in Sydney.
  - (United States) – Sonoma–Marin Area Rail Transit begins revenue service to Larkspur Landing, facilitating a rail-ferry link to San Francisco. Novato Downtown station, an infill station, is opened the same day.
- (Denmark) (Germany) December 15 – Copenhagen–Hamburg freight traffic transferred wholly to rail, ending rail freight usage of Baltic train ferries.
- (China) December 16 – Qingdao Metro Line 2 extended to Taishanlu from Zhiquanlu.
- (China) December 20 – Guangzhou Metro Line 21 extended to Zhenlong West from Yuancun.
- (South Korea) December 21 – In Seoul, Line 6 of the Seoul Metropolitan Subway is extended to Sinnae.
- December 25
  - (China) – Xiamen Metro Line 2 and Suzhou Metro Line 3 began operation.
  - (Russia) – The first scheduled passenger train crosses the Crimean Bridge.
- (China) December 26 – Hefei Metro Line 3 opened.
- (China) December 27 – Chengdu MetroLine 5 opened, Line 10 extended to Xinjin, Tram Line 2 extended.
- (China) December 28 – Ji'nan Metro Line 3 opened; extension sections of Tianjin Metro Line 1, Zhengzhou Metro Line 2 and Guiyang Metro Line 1 opened.
- December 29
  - (China) – Line 1 of Hohhot Metro opened
  - (United States) – The Loop Trolley in St. Louis, Missouri ceases running after just over 13 months of operation.
- December 30
  - (China) – Beijing–Zhangjiakou intercity railway, Zhangjiakou–Hohhot high-speed railway and Datong–Zhangjiakou high-speed railway begin operation
  - (China) – Extension sections of Chongqing Rail Transit Loop line and Line 1 opened.
  - (China) – Gaoming Tram begins operations, Line T1 of Songjiang Tram extended to Xinqiao railway station.
