= 1948 in rail transport =

This article lists events related to rail transport that occurred in 1948.

In 1948, 14 railroads in North America owned more than 1,000 steam locomotives each. See also: Historical sizes of railroads

== Events ==
=== January ===
- January 1 – All major railways in Great Britain are nationalised under terms of the Transport Act 1947, the Big Four British railway companies (the Great Western Railway, London and North Eastern Railway, London, Midland and Scottish Railway and Southern Railway) becoming British Railways.
- January 4 – Chicago, Rock Island and Pacific Railroad and Southern Pacific Railroad debut a new lightweight passenger car consist for the Golden State passenger train between Chicago, Illinois, and Los Angeles, California.

=== February ===
- February–April – Queensland Railway strike, a labor union strike over wages issues by railway workshop and locomotive depot workers in Queensland, Australia.
- February 4 – The last steam locomotive built for the Atchison, Topeka and Santa Fe Railway, 4-8-4 no. 3752, is test fired at the factory.
- February 15 – The Monon Railroad introduces the Thoroughbred streamliner between Chicago, Illinois and Louisville, Kentucky, replacing the Day Express.
- February 20 – Opening of Transandino del Norte branch of Ferrocarril General Manuel Belgrano from Salta, Argentina through to Socompa and Antofagasta, Chile.
- February 29 – Atchison, Topeka and Santa Fe Railway upgrades its El Capitan passenger train service frequency to daily.

=== March ===
- 1 March – Foreign-owned railway companies nationalised in Argentina during the first term of office of President Peron.
- 2 March – Haganah bombing in Mandatory Palestine leads to suspension of services on the Jezreel Valley railway.

=== April ===
- April 3 – The Atchison, Topeka and Santa Fe Railway introduces its Texas Chief passenger train, operating between Chicago and Galveston, Texas via Kansas City, Oklahoma City, Fort Worth and Houston.

=== May ===
- May 1 – East African Railways and Harbours Corporation formed by merger of the Kenya and Uganda Railways and Harbours and the Tanganyika Railways and Ports Services.
- May 14 – The Bangor and Aroostook Railroad inaugurates its first diesel-powered passenger train.
- May 29 – The Chicago, Milwaukee, St. Paul and Pacific Railroad introduces streamlined Skytop Lounges on its Twin Cities Hiawatha trains.

=== June ===
- June 21 – Alco delivers its last steam locomotive: Pittsburgh and Lake Erie Railroad 2-8-4 no. 9406.
- June – Lima Locomotive Works delivers Chesapeake and Ohio class L-2-A 4-8-4 no. 614, the last express passenger steam locomotive for a United States railroad.

=== July ===
- July 2 – The Nickel Plate Road orders 10 class S-3 Berkshires from Lima Locomotive Works, the last steam locomotives Lima will produce.
- July 3 – The New York Central Railroad issues a report that only 20 per cent of its long-distance passenger trains are diesel powered, but the number was expected to rise to 50% by year's end.
- July 28 – The New York, Ontario and Western Railway becomes an all-diesel railroad.

=== August ===
- August 15 – First run of Missouri Pacific’s Texas Eagle.

=== September ===
- September 15 – The postwar 20th Century Limited is put into service in ceremonies attended by several dignitaries, including Dwight Eisenhower.

=== October ===
- October 26 – The American Freedom Train, carrying the original versions of the United States Constitution, Declaration of Independence and the Bill of Rights, makes its final public display in Havre de Grace, Maryland before the official end of tour. See also American Freedom Train - 1947-1949 station stops

=== November ===
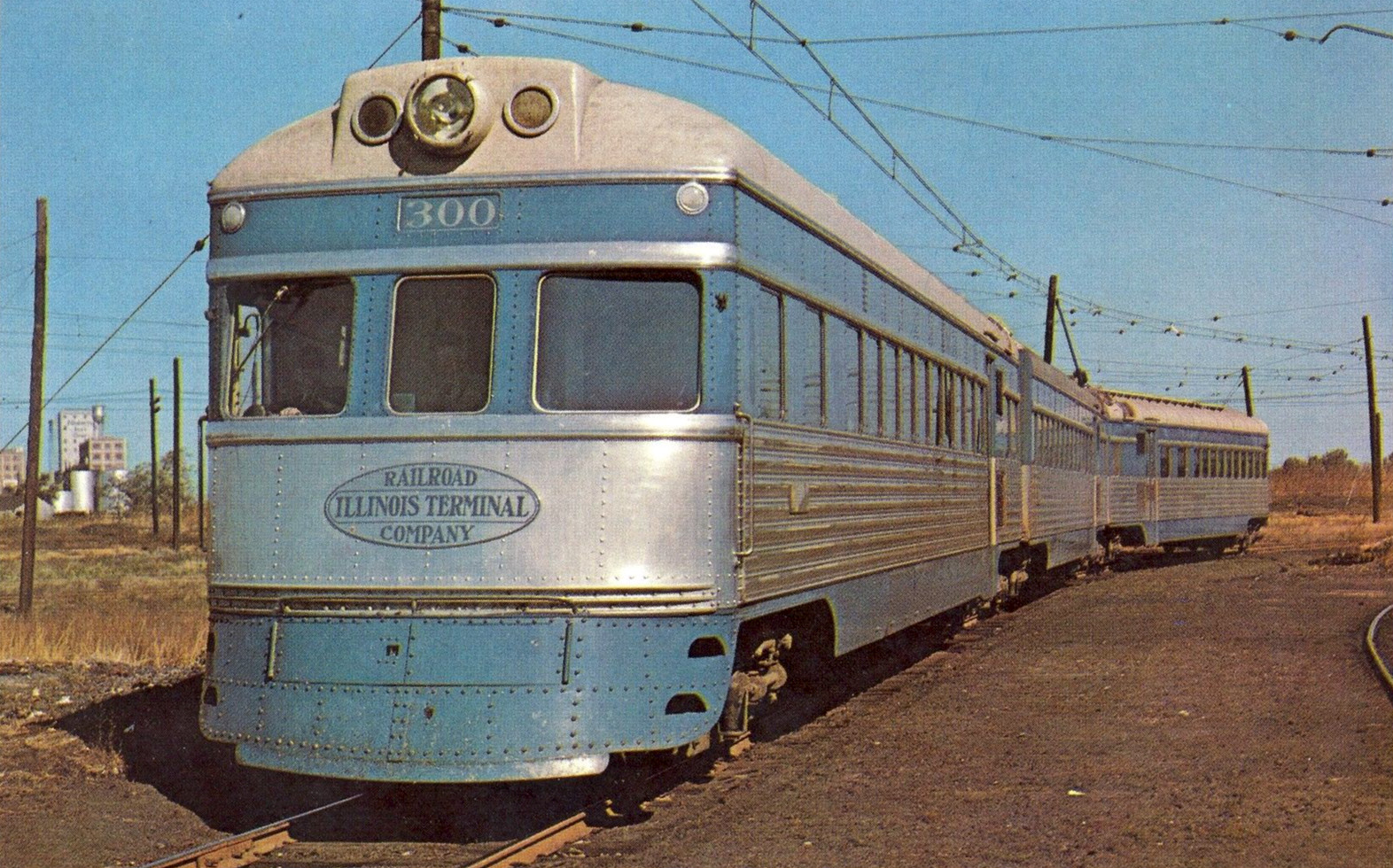
An ITC Streamliner

- November 7 – The Illinois Terminal Railroad introduces the Streamliner City of Decatur between St. Louis, Missouri and Decatur, Illinois.

=== December ===
- December 12 – The Pennsylvania Railroad introduces the Steeler passenger train between Pittsburgh, Pennsylvania and Cleveland, Ohio.

=== Unknown date ===
- George Walker succeeds William Neal as president of Canadian Pacific Railway.
- In order to avoid import tariffs into Canada, Baldwin Locomotive Works contracts the Canadian Locomotive Company to be Baldwin's Canadian representatives and locomotive builders.
- First batch of Indian Railways standard 5 ft 6 in (1,676 mm) gauge 2-8-2 goods locomotives to Class WG is ordered from the North British Locomotive Company in Glasgow. Nearly 2450 of the class will be constructed in the UK, United States and India between 1950 and 1970, the largest class in the British Commonwealth.

== Births ==
=== June births ===
- June 30 - Vladimir Yakunin, CEO of Russian Railways from 2005 (died 2015).

=== December births ===
- December 23 - Joseph H. Boardman, CEO of Amtrak 2008–16 (died 2019).

== Deaths ==
=== March deaths ===
- March 5 - H. P. M. Beames, Chief Mechanical Engineer of the London and North Western Railway 1920–1922 (born 1875).
