= Sarıkamış railway station =

Railway station in Turkey

SARIKAMIŞ

General information
- Location: Kars-Sarıkamış Yolu, Sarıkamış, Turkey
- Coordinates: 40.200857°N 42.343596°E
- Owner: TCDD
- Line: Eastern Express
- Platforms: 2
- Tracks: 4

Construction
- Structure type: At-grade

Other information
- Status: In Operation
- Station code: 4636

History
- Opened: 1913; 113 years ago
- Rebuilt: 1962; 64 years ago

Services
Preceding station	TCDD Taşımacılık	Following station
Erzurum towards Ankara	Eastern Express (Tourist)	Kars Terminus
Topdağ towards Ankara	Eastern Express	Selim towards Kars
Location

Sarıkamış station is a railway station in the town of Sarıkamış, Turkey. The station is serviced by the Eastern Express, operated by the Turkish State Railways, running between Istanbul and Kars. The station was built in 1913 with broad gauge tracks by the Russian Empire. The tracks were converted into standard gauge in 1962.
