= Divriği railway station =

Railway station in Divriği, Turkey

DİVRİĞİ
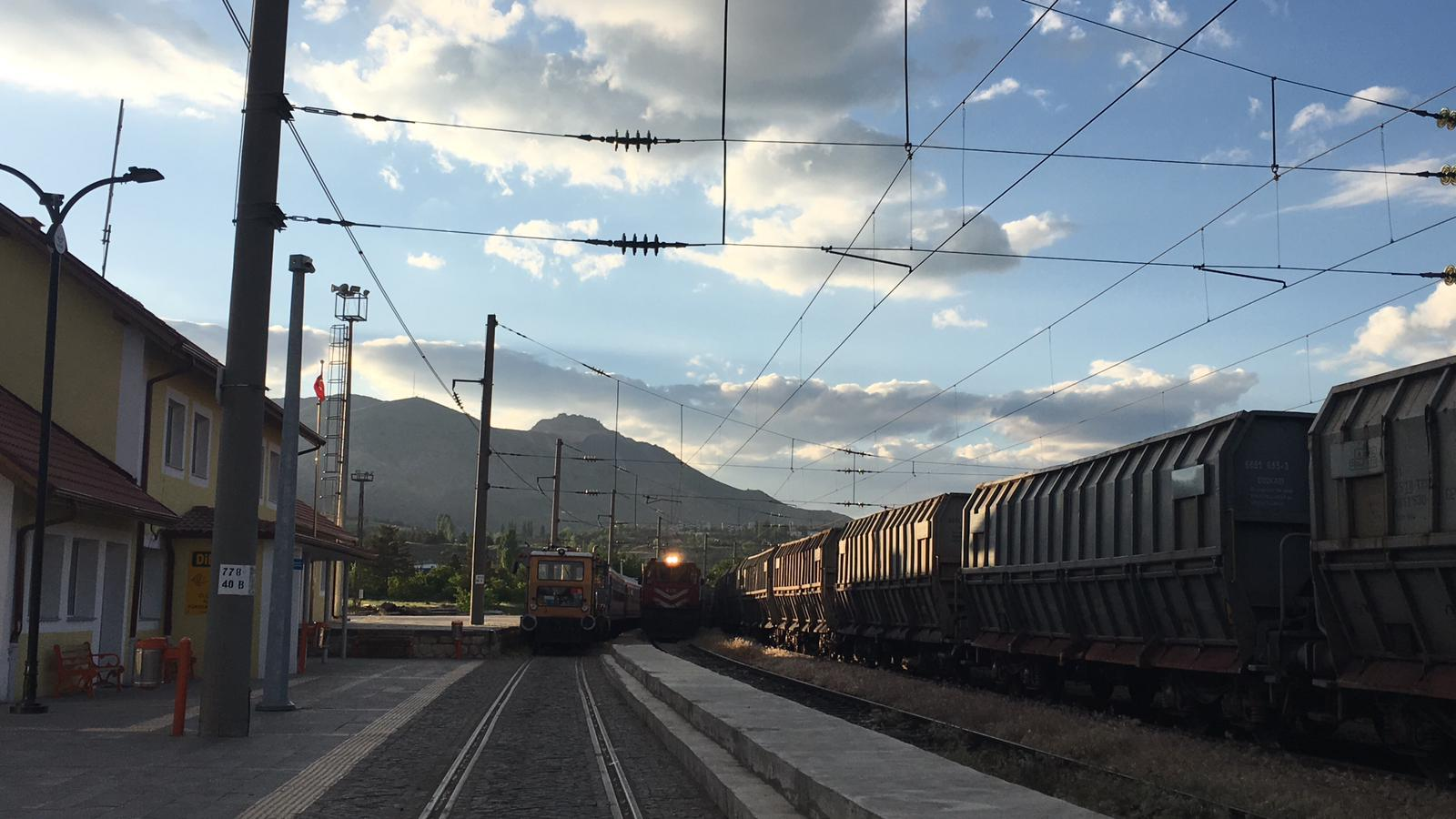
- The Eastern Express arriving at the station.

General information
- Location: İstasyon Cd., Kalealtı Mah., 58300; Divriği/Sivas; Turkey
- Coordinates: 39.3838°N 38.1138°E
- System: TCDD intercity and regional rail station
- Owner: Turkish State Railways
- Line: Eastern Express Sivas–Divriği Erzincan–Divriği
- Platforms: 2 (1 island platform, 1 side platform)
- Tracks: 2

Construction
- Structure type: At-grade

History
- Opened: 11 December 1938
- Electrified: 1994; 25 kV AC, 60 Hz

Services
Preceding station	TCDD Taşımacılık	Following station
Demirdağ towards Ankara	Eastern Express	Kemaliye Çaltı towards Kars
Demirdağ towards Sivas	Sivas–Divriği	Terminus
Terminus	Erzincan–Divriği	Dazlak towards Erzincan
Location

Divriği station (Turkish: Divriği garı) is a railway station in Divriği, Turkey. Located in the eastern Sivas Province, and in the northeast of the town, TCDD Taşımacılık operates a daily intercity train, the Eastern Express, from Ankara (temporarily Irmak) to Kars, a daily regional train to Erzincan and a thrice daily regional train to Sivas. Divriği station was opened on 11 December 1938 by the Turkish State Railways.
