= Çetinkaya, Kangal =

Çetinkaya
- Village
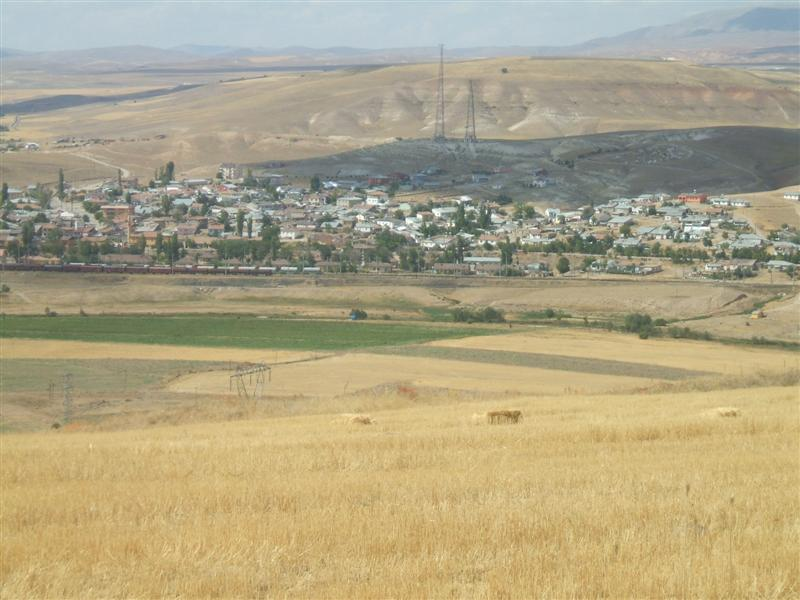
- A view from the village

- Location within Turkey Location within Turkey Central Anatolia
- Coordinates: 39.251°N 37.607°E
- Country: Turkey
- Province: Sivas
- District: Kangal
- Elevation: 1,432 m (4,698 ft)
- Population (2023): 881
- Time zone: UTC+3 (TRT)

Çetinkaya is a village in the Kangal District of the Sivas Province in Turkey. It is populated by Kurds and had a population of 882 in 2023. Before the 2013 reorganisation, it was a town (belde).

== Highway ==
The village is located just north of the D.260 state highway and Çetinkaya station is serviced by intercity trains from Ankara (temporarily Irmak) to Kars, Kurtalan, and Tatvan, as well as regional trains from Sivas to Divriği.
