= Yahşihan District =

District of Kırıkkale Province, Turkey

- District
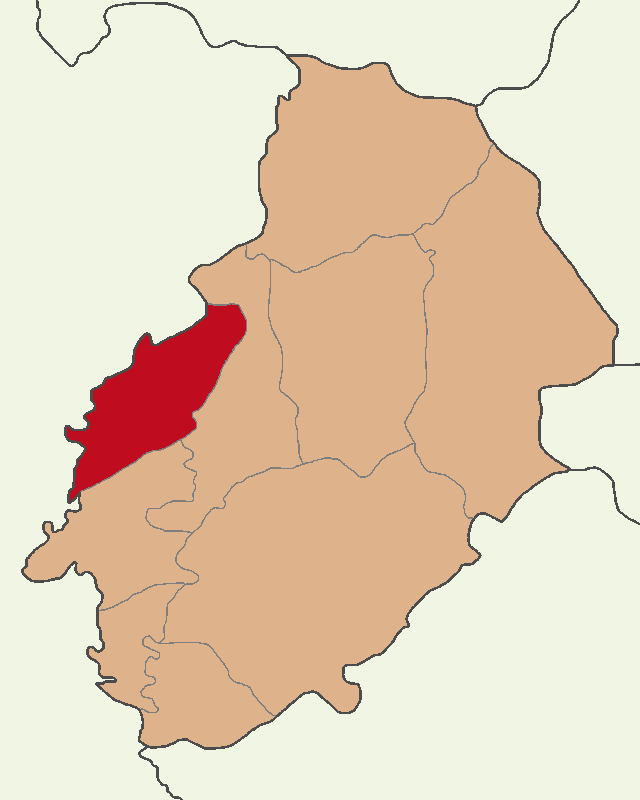
- Map showing Yahşihan District in Kırıkkale Province

- Location in Turkey Yahşihan District (Turkey Central Anatolia)
- Coordinates: 39°51′N 33°27′E
- Country: Turkey
- Province: Kırıkkale
- Seat: Yahşihan

Government
  - Kaymakam: Ender Faruk Uzunoğlu
- Area: 304 km^{2} (117 sq mi)
- Population (2022): 33,659
  - Density: 110/km^{2} (290/sq mi)
- Time zone: UTC+3 (TRT)
- Website: www.yahsihan.gov.tr

Yahşihan District is a district of the Kırıkkale Province of Turkey. Its seat is the town of Yahşihan. Its area is 304 km^{2}, and its population is 33,659 (2022).

== Composition ==
There is one municipality in Yahşihan District:

- Yahşihan

There are 7 villages in Yahşihan District:

- Bedesten
- Hacıbalı
- Hisarköy
- Irmak
- Keçili
- Kılıçlar
- Mahmutlar
