= Karasüver =

- Village
- Location within Turkey Location within Turkey Central Anatolia
- Coordinates: 39°01′46″N 37°35′57″E
- Country: Turkey
- Province: Sivas
- District: Kangal
- Population (2022): 89
- Time zone: UTC+3 (TRT)

Karasüver (formerly Kuzyaka) is a village in the Kangal District of Sivas Province, Turkey. Its population is 89 (2022). It is 35 km away from the central town of Kangal. It is a Alevi Turkish village.
