= Divriği A-Kafa mine =

Turkish mine

- Location within Turkey

Location
- Location: Divriği, Sivas Province, Turkey; 39°25′28.92″N 38°4′59.52″E

Production
- Products: Iron

History
- Opened: 1935

Owner
- Company: Etibank

The Divriği A-Kafa mine is a large mine in the east of Turkey in Sivas Province 245 km east of the capital, Ankara. Divriği A-Kafa represents the largest iron reserve in Turkey having estimated reserves of 100 million tonnes of ore grading 55% iron. The 100 million tonnes of ore contains 55 million tonnes of iron metal.
