= Akyaka railway station =

Railway station in Turkey

AKYAKA
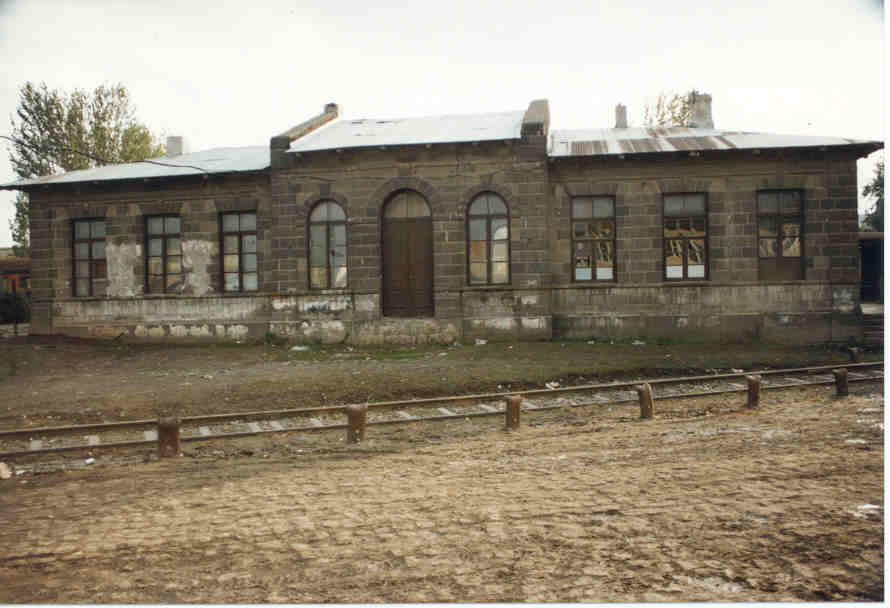
- The station building in 1997, with the now dismantled wye track in the foreground.

General information
- Location: İstasyon Cd. 25, İstasyon Mah. 36780; Akyaka/Kars; Turkey
- Coordinates: 40.739872°N 43.623831°E
- System: TCDD regional rail station
- Owner: Turkish State Railways
- Operator: TCDD Taşımacılık
- Line: Kars–Akyaka
- Platforms: 2 (1 side platform, 1 island platform)
- Tracks: 2

Construction
- Structure type: At-grade

History
- Opened: 1899
- Closed: 1993-2011
- Rebuilt: 1962

Services
Preceding station	TCDD Taşımacılık	Following station
Şahnalar towards Kars	Kars–Akyaka	Terminus
Location

Akyaka station (Turkish: Akyaka garı) is a station in the town of Akyaka, Kars in northeastern Turkey. TCDD Taşımacılık operates a twice-daily regional train from Kars.

The station was originally opened in 1899 by the Transcaucasus Railway as Shuregel station (Turkish: Şöregel, Russian: Шурегель), when Akyaka was a part of the Russian Empire. In 1922, the station was renamed Kızılçakçak station to reflect the name change of the settlement. The railway, and the station, was taken over by the Turkish government-owned Eastern Railway in 1925, which became the Turkish State Railways in 1929. In 1962, TCDD converted the broad gauge railway to standard gauge and rebuilt the station, which was renamed to its current name in 1966. Due to the border closure between Turkey and Armenia, train service east of Kars was suspended in 1993 until February 2011, when TCDD returned train service to Akyaka.

Akyaka station is located in the town center in the vicinity of the town post office and police station.
