= Humarlı, Kangal =

Village in Sivas Province, Turkey

Humarlı
- Village
- Location in Turkey Humarlı (Turkey Central Anatolia)
- Coordinates: 39.206°N 37.174°E
- Country: Turkey
- Province: Sivas
- District: Kangal
- Population (2023): 89
- Time zone: UTC+3 (TRT)

Humarlı is a village in the Kangal District of Sivas Province in Turkey. It is populated by Kurds of the Şadiyan tribe and had a population of 89 in 2023.
