= Tohma Bridge =

Tohma Bridge Tohma Köprüsü
- Coordinates: 38.50483°N 38.23863°E
- Carries: Motor vehicles
- Crosses: Karakaya Dam Reservoir
- Locale: Tohma, Malatya Province, Turkey
- Begins: 2018
- Other name(s): Şehit Gaffar Güneş Köprüsü; Martyr Gaffar Güneş Bridge

Characteristics
- Design: Box girder bridge
- Material: Prestressed concrete
- Trough construction: Steel
- Pier construction: Bored pile
- Total length: 517.5 m (1,698 ft)
- Width: 16.5 m (54 ft)
- Height: 21 m (69 ft)
- Longest span: 34.5 m (113 ft)
- No. of spans: 15
- No. of lanes: 2

History
- Contracted lead designer: Ziver İnşaat Co.
- Constructed by: PYES Co.
- Inaugurated: 6 February 2021; 4 years ago

Location
- Interactive map of Tohma Bridge

Tohma Bridge (Turkish: Tohma Köprüsü), also known as Martyr Gaffar Güneş Bridge (Şehit Gaffar Güneş Köprüsü), is a road bridge in Malatya Province, eastern Turkey.

The bridge crosses the Karakaya Dam reservoir on the State road D.875 between the provinces Malatya and Sivas. It is to connect Eastern Anatolia and Southeastern Anatolia regions with Black Sea Region via Malatya.

Started in 2018, it was designed as a box girder bridge and built with prestressed concrete using incremental launch method by PYES Co. under the contractor Ziver İnşaat Co. For the construction of the bridge were 12,000 m^{3} (420,000 cu ft) concrete, 2,700 tons steel for girders of 3 m × 16 m (9.8 ft × 52.5 ft) dimension and 4,360 m (14,300 ft) bored pile used. It features seismic base isolators on both ends to withstand earthquakes. Opened on 6 February 2021, the bridge is 517.5 m (1,698 ft) long, 16.5 m (54 ft) wide and 21 m (69 ft) high with a total of 15 spans of 34.5 m (113 ft). It carries two lanes in each direction.
