= Yahşihan =

- Municipality
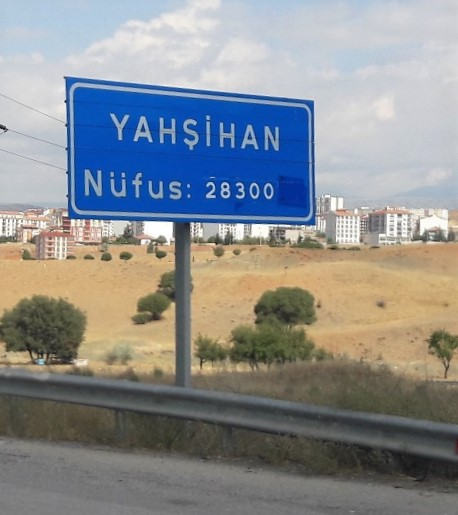

- Location within Turkey Location within Turkey Central Anatolia
- Coordinates: 39°51′01″N 33°27′13″E
- Country: Turkey
- Province: Kırıkkale
- District: Yahşihan

Government
  - Mayor: Ahmet Sungur (AKP)
- Elevation: 714 m (2,343 ft)
- Population (2024): 38,530
- Time zone: UTC+3 (TRT)
- Postal code: 71450
- Area code: 0318
- Climate: Csa
- Website: www.yahsihan.bel.tr

Yahşihan is a town in Kırıkkale Province in the Central Anatolia region of Turkey. It serves as the administrative seat of Yahşihan District. Yahşihan was elected from the AK Party in the 2024 Turkish Local Elections, with Ahmet Sungur serving as the mayor. According to the 2024 census, the district's total population was 38,530.
