= Mountain View train collision =

2019 railway incident in Pretoria, South Africa

Details
- Date: 8 January 2019
- Location: Mountain View station, Pretoria
- Country: South Africa
- Incident type: Head-on collision

Statistics
- Trains: 2
- Passengers: 800
- Deaths: 4
- Injured: 620

The Mountain View train collision occurred on 8 January 2019 when two passenger trains collided at Mountain View station, Pretoria, South Africa. Four people were killed and more than 600 others were injured.

== Collision ==
The collision occurred at about 09:30 a.m. on 8 January 2019 when two passenger trains were involved in a collision at Mountain View station, Pretoria, South Africa. It is unclear whether the accident was a head-on collision, or a rear-end collision. There were over 800 passengers on the two trains. Four people were killed and more than 620 were injured. Almost all of the injured sustained minor injuries, with some moderately injured. Two critically injured victims were airlifted to hospital. Many people were trapped in the wreckage, and fears were expressed that the casualty toll would grow as recovery operations took place.

== Investigation ==
An investigation was opened into the accident. Vandalism and cable theft were suggested as causes for the collision.
