= Faruk Mercan =

Turkish journalist and writer

Faruk Mercan (born 1971) is a Turkish journalist and writer. He is a journalist for Aksiyon and the author of a number of books on the Turkish deep state, including books on Üzeyir Garih, Nesim Malki and the Susurluk scandal. He has worked at Dünya Radyo and the Zaman newspaper.

Mercan graduated from Ankara University, Law School in 1993.

== Books ==
- Fethullah Gülen (2008), Doğan Kitap
- Niso, Nesim Malki Cinayeti (2007), Doğan Kitap
- Boğazın Şövalyesi, Üzeyir Garih Cinayeti (2007), Doğan Kitap
- Onlar Başroldeydi (2007), Doğan Kitap
- Savaşçının Dönüşü (2006)
- Apolet, Kılıç ve İktidar (2004)
- Susurluk Prensleri, Bir Gizli Savaşın Perde Arkası (1999)
- Üzeyir Garih'in Son Randevusu (2002)
- Niso: Nesim Malki'nin Sıradışı Hikâyesi (2001)
