= Çömlekli, Kurtalan =

Village in Siirt Province, Turkey

Çömlekli
- Neighbourhood
- Location in Turkey
- Coordinates: 37.90947°N 41.68104°E
- Country: Turkey
- Province: Siirt
- District: Kurtalan
- Time zone: UTC+3 (TRT)

Çömlekli (Syriac: Kūtīb) is a neighbourhood in the Kurtalan District of Siirt Province in Turkey.

== History ==
Kūtīb (today called Çömlekli) was historically inhabited by Syriac Orthodox Christians. In the Syriac Orthodox patriarchal register of dues of 1870, it was recorded that the village had 12 households, who paid 39 dues, and did not have a church or a priest. Shammās Ibrahim, son of Isḥāq, was ordained as deacon for Kūtīb on 20 January 1327 AH (1909 AD).

== Bibliography ==
- Bcheiry, Iskandar (2009). The Syriac Orthodox Patriarchal Register of Dues of 1870: An Unpublished Historical Document from the Late Ottoman Period. Gorgias Press.
- Bcheiry, Iskandar (2023). "A Syriac Orthodox List of Diyāqūs (Servants of the Church) from the Late Ottoman Period" (PDF). The International Journal of Levant Studies. 5: 25–74.
