= Mercan Erzincan =

Turkish singer (born 1976)

Mercan Erzincan, née Mercan Şimşek (1976 in Divriği, Sivas Province), is a Turkish singer of Turkish folk songs and a player of the long-necked lute (bağlama).

== Life and work ==
Mercan Erzincan was born into an Alevi family in the small Central Anatolian town of Divriği. In 1987, she began her music education studies at the Istanbul State Conservatory of Music, graduating with a bachelor's degree in 1998. A year earlier, under her birth name Mercan Şimşek, she released her first album, Alican'a Ağıt, featuring bağlama and vocals, on the label ASM ("Arif Sağ Müzik"), founded by Arif Sağ. The Turkish-Alevi musician Arif Sağ (born 1945) is considered one of the most influential bağlama players of the second half of the 20th century, whose style shaped the next generation of bağlama players. The bağlama is considered a symbol of religious identity for Alevis. Erzincan then completed a master's degree in Turkish folk music (Türk halk müziği) at Haliç University in 2005.

Erzincan's 2006 master's thesis examines the relationship between Turkish folk songs (türkü) and their performance practice with specific musical instruments, as well as the cultural reception when musicians transfer musical genres to other instruments or into other contexts. She investigates this using the example of the West Turkish folk dance style Zeybek, which, like most Turkish folk dances, is accompanied outdoors by the conical oboe zurna and the cylindrical drum davul. Indoors, Zeybek dances are traditionally performed with the bağlama and the spiked fiddle kabak-kemane. Amplifier systems now make it possible to play Zeybek melodies outdoors with stringed instruments. In such cultural adaptations, Erzincan distinguishes between a “natural adaptation” (occurring spontaneously, the work retains its character) and an “artistic adaptation” (arrangement of the musical theme by a professional musician for their own instrument).

Mercan Erzincan has been married since 2000 to the musician and singer Erdal Erzincan (born 1971), also a student of Arif Sağ. From 1994, she taught Turkish folk music and the saz at Sağ's music school, Erdal Erzincan Müzik Merkezi, in Istanbul. Since 2010, Erzincan has taught these subjects at the Nâzım Hikmet Academy of Music, Literature, Film, and Theatre, founded in 2009 by the Nâzım Hikmet Cultural Association in Istanbul. Erzincan also gave lectures on Alevi folk music and the tradition of the bards (aşık) and produced radio (2002 Radyo Barış, 2003 Cem Radyo) and television (2007 Düzgün TV) programs on Turkish folk music.

The genres of Turkish folk songs that Erzincan performs include uzun hava (“long melody”), zeybek (folk dance), ağıt (lament), and deyiş (Alevi song). Mercan Erzincan performs solo and in duets with Erdal Erzincan and other bağlama players and singers in Turkey and abroad. In addition, she also gave concerts as a member of two women's ensembles that combine music and dance with a feminist approach: Sözümüz Var Şarkılarla ("Words with Songs") from 2007 and Kırk Yamalı Bohça from 2008. Sözümüz Var Şarkılarla is based on a research project initiated in 2005 by the musician and singer Feryal Öney within the framework of the folk music association Folklor Kulübü (BÜFK) at Istanbul's Boğaziçi University. The project aims to collect folk songs (kadın ağzı türküler) originating from women and categorize them in relation to the women's socio-cultural environment.

A CD compilation released in 2021 contains pieces by 36 Turkish folk musicians: Kadınlar Dünyayı Çalıyor Söylüyor ("Women Play and Sing About the World"). Erzincan's contribution is an example of Alevi folk music. As a continuation of this project, a collection of essays with the same title, edited by ethnomusicologist Özlem Doğuş Varli, was published in 2022: Kadınlar Dünyayı Çalıyor / Söylüyor Kuramsal Yaklaşımlar ve Deneyimler Üzerine ("Women Play/Sing About the World: Theoretical Approaches and Experiences"). Mercan Erzincan's essay deals with "female bards in Anatolian Alevism in the context of cultural memory and their reflection on contemporary Alevi music."

Mercan and Erdal Erzincan have a son.

== Discography ==
=== Albums ===
- 1997: Alican'a Ağıt (ASM)
- 2002: Düslerim Yol Alir (Güvercin Müzik)
- 2008: Mihman (Güv(Ercin Music)
- 2012: "Seyir" (Iber Music)
- 2017: "Gökkuşağı" (Temkeş Music)

=== Collaboration ===
- 2014: Group: "Oyalı Yazma" with Mercan Erzincan, Devrim Kaya and Buse Katılmış: "Harran'dan Harput'a Meşk" (Kalan Music)
- 2021: Title 2: "Mecnuna Donmusem" from the Album: "Women Are Stealing/Singing the World" (Lavanta)

=== EPs ===
- 2020: "Ümit Hep Var" (Temkeş Music)
- 2021: "Bird Language" (Temkeş Music)
- 2023: "Canfeza" (Temkeş Music)

=== Singles (selection) ===
- 2014: Get News From My Prim
- 2018: I'm Offended (with Erdal Erzincan)
