= Mezraa railway station =

Railway station in Kars, Turkey

MEZRAA

General information
- Coordinates: 40.7079°N 43.1983°E
- System: TCDD
- Owner: TCDD
- Platforms: 1
- Tracks: 1

Construction
- Structure type: At-grade

Other information
- Status: In Operation

History
- Opened: 1899
- Rebuilt: 1962
Location

Mezraa station is located near the village of Mezra in the Kars Province of Turkey. The railway to Baku will split from the line here. It is serviced by the daily Kars-Akyaka Regional train.
