= Karakaya Dam =

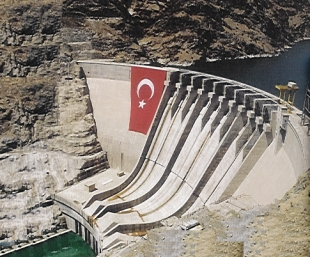

- Location within Turkey
- Interactive map of Karakaya Dam
- Location: Euphrates, Turkey
- Coordinates: 38°13′40″N 39°08′20″E
- Opening date: 1987

Dam and spillways
- Type of dam: Arch-gravity dam
- Impounds: Euphrates River
- Height: 158 m (518 ft)
- Height (foundation): 173 m (568 ft)
- Length: 462 m (1,516 ft)

Reservoir
- Total capacity: 9.5 km^{3} (7,700,000 acre⋅ft)

Power Station
- Turbines: 6 × 300 MW
- Installed capacity: 1,800 MW

The Karakaya Dam is one of the 21 dams of the Southeastern Anatolia Project of Turkey, built on the Euphrates River and completed in 1987. The hydroelectric dam generates power with six units of 300 MW, totalling the installed capacity to 1,800 MW.

== Conflict with Iraq and Syria ==
The Euphrates River is an important water source for both Syria and Iraq, and both countries expressed concerns about the Karakaya Dam construction project. A treaty guaranteed a minimum water flow of 500 m^{3}/s (18,000 cu ft/s) through the dam.

== Involuntary resettlement ==
According to Terminski (2013), the construction of the Karakaya Dam resulted in involuntary resettlement of approximately 30,000 people.

== See also ==
- List of conventional hydroelectric power stations
- List of power stations in Turkey
- Tohma Bridge

== Notes ==
- State Hydraulic Works (DSİ), Turkey. "General information on Karakaya Dam, Turkey". Archived from the original on 2014-07-02.
- "United Nations Southeast Anatolia Sustainable Human Development Program (GAP)". Archived from the original on 2 March 2006.
- "Current status of GAP as of June 2000". Archived from the original on 16 July 2011.
- "Data sheet" (PDF). Archived from the original (PDF) on 28 September 2007.
