= Lake Kadı =

Kadıgölü

Location
- country: Turkey
- district: Erzincan Province

Physical characteristics
- Source
  - coordinates: 39.26278126384159°N 38.49319507332276°E
- Mouth: Euphrates
  - coordinates: 39.2658°N 38.4977°E

Kadıgölü (Turkish: Kadıgölü) is a fresh water creek located in Kemaliye district of Erzincan Province, Turkey.

The source of the river is the outlet of groundwater (that comes from mountains) between Taşdibi and Orta mosques. Source water of the river is a rapid cold stream, which rises particularly in April. Kadıgölü is used for the needs of tap water and irrigation in Kemaliye district. In the past, Kadıgölü was used to supply electric power to the town. There are many watermills with some restored ones on the banks of the creek. Fish hatcheries around the lake offer also fish food.

Access to the creek from the district center is available only by private car.
