= Haydar Çetinkaya =

Turkish para-Nordic skier (born 1976)

Personal information
- National team: Turkey
- Born: 1976 (age 48–49) Gerede, Bolu Province, Turkey
- Home town: Bolu, Turkey
- Occupation(s): Sportt executive, coach

Sport
- Country: Turkey
- Sport: para-Nordic skiing =
- Disability class: LW2

Haydar Çetinkaya (born 1976) is a Turkish para-Nordic skier, who competes in the LW2 disability class. He is Turkey's first international para-Nordic skier.

== Personal life ==
Haydar Çetinkaya was born in 1976. He lives in Gerede, Bolu Province, Turkey.

He serves as a member of the Board of Directors of the Turkey Ski Federation responsible for the national cross-country ski team. In March 2018, he was appointed District Sports Director of Gerede.

== Sport career ==
He established the Arkut Cross-country Skiing and Biathlon Center in Gerede, where he instructed and coached many cross-country skiers.

On the last weekend of March 2022, he was participating on the track preparations for the Balkan Cup to be held at Arkut Center in Gerede. As he passed by the snow groomer, his sholace got caught in the tracks of the vehicle, and he was trapped under the tracked machine. He was helped by colleagues, and was immediately treated at the scene by a medical staff. He survived the accident, and was rushed to the hospital of the Bolu Abant İzzet Baysal University. He suffered serious damage to his left leg. After rehabilitation, he returned to cross-country skiing using a limb prostheses.

Already in December 2022, Çetinkaya represented Turkey at the 2023 FIS Para Nordic World Cup in Vuokatti, Finland. He competed in the LW2 disability class of men's standing 10km Nordic skiing event, did not, however, finish the race. He became so Turkey's first international para-Nordic skier.
