= Kangal District =

District of Sivas Province, Turkey

- District
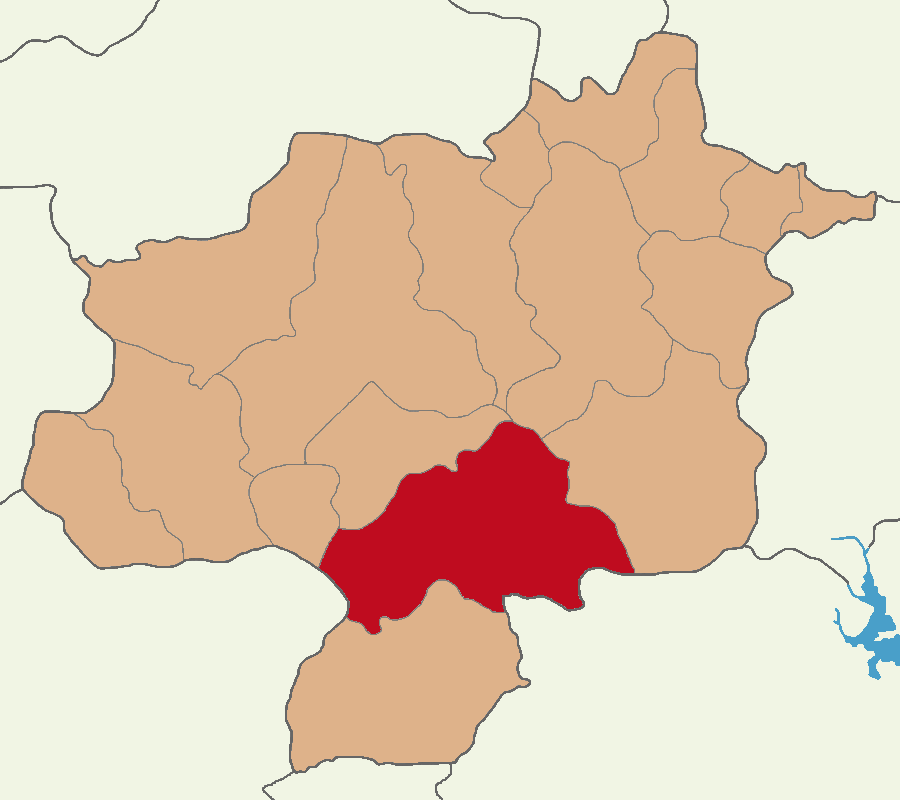
- Map showing Kangal District in Sivas Province

- Location in Turkey Kangal District (Turkey Central Anatolia)
- Coordinates: 39°14′N 37°23′E
- Country: Turkey
- Province: Sivas
- Seat: Kangal

Government
  - Kaymakam: Onur Aykaç
- Area: 3,342 km^{2} (1,290 sq mi)
- Population (2022): 19,667
  - Density: 5.9/km^{2} (15/sq mi)
- Time zone: UTC+3 (TRT)
- Website: www.kangal.gov.tr

Kangal District is a district of the Sivas Province of Turkey. Its seat is the town of Kangal. Its area is 3,342 km^{2}, and its population is 19,667 (2022).

The district is populated by Turks, Kurds, Circassians, Chechens, and Armenians.

== Composition ==
There is one municipality in Kangal District:

- Kangal

There are 112 villages in Kangal District:

- Akçakale
- Akçamağara
- Akçaşehir
- Akdere
- Akgedik
- Akpınar
- Aktepe
- Alacahan
- Alacahan Yeniköy
- Armağan
- Arpalı
- Aşağıhüyük
- Avşarören
- Bahçeliyurt
- Bektaşköy
- Beyyurdu
- Boğaz
- Bozarmut
- Bulak
- Çağlıcaören
- Çamurlu
- Çatköy
- Çayırova
- Çetinkaya
- Cevizköy
- Çiftlikören
- Çipil
- Dağönü
- Davulbaz
- Dayılı
- Deligazili
- Deliktaş
- Delioğlanderesi
- Dereköy
- Dışlık
- Düzce
- Eğricek
- Elalibey
- Elkondu
- Etyemez
- Eymir
- Gebelikatran
- Gençali
- Güneypınar
- Gürükbekir
- Hamal
- Hamzabey
- Hatunçayırı
- Havuz
- Humarlı
- Hüyüklüyurt
- İğdeli
- İğdelidere
- İmamınköyü
- Irmaç
- Kabakçevliği
- Kalkım
- Kangaltekkesi
- Karacaören
- Karagücük
- Karamehmetli
- Karanlık
- Karasüver
- Kavak
- Kavak Mescit
- Killik
- Kırkpınar
- Kızıldikme
- Kızıliniş
- Kocakurt
- Koçköprü
- Külekli
- Kürkçü
- Kuruayşe
- Kuşkayası
- Maksutlu
- Mancılık
- Mescit
- Minarekaya
- Mısırören
- Mühürkulak
- Mürsel
- Oğlaklı
- Onaran
- Örencik
- Paşamçayırı
- Pınargözü
- Saçayağı
- Sarıkadı
- Sarıpınar
- Seçenyurdu
- Şekerpınar
- Sipahi
- Soğukpınar
- Sultanpınarı
- Sutaşı
- Tahtalı
- Taşlı
- Taşlık
- Tatlıpınar
- Tilkihüyük
- Topardıç
- Turnalı
- Yarhisar
- Yaylacık
- Yellice
- Yeşildere
- Yeşilkale
- Yeşilvadi
- Yeşilyurt
- Yukarıhüyük
- Zerk
