= Kangal =

- Municipality
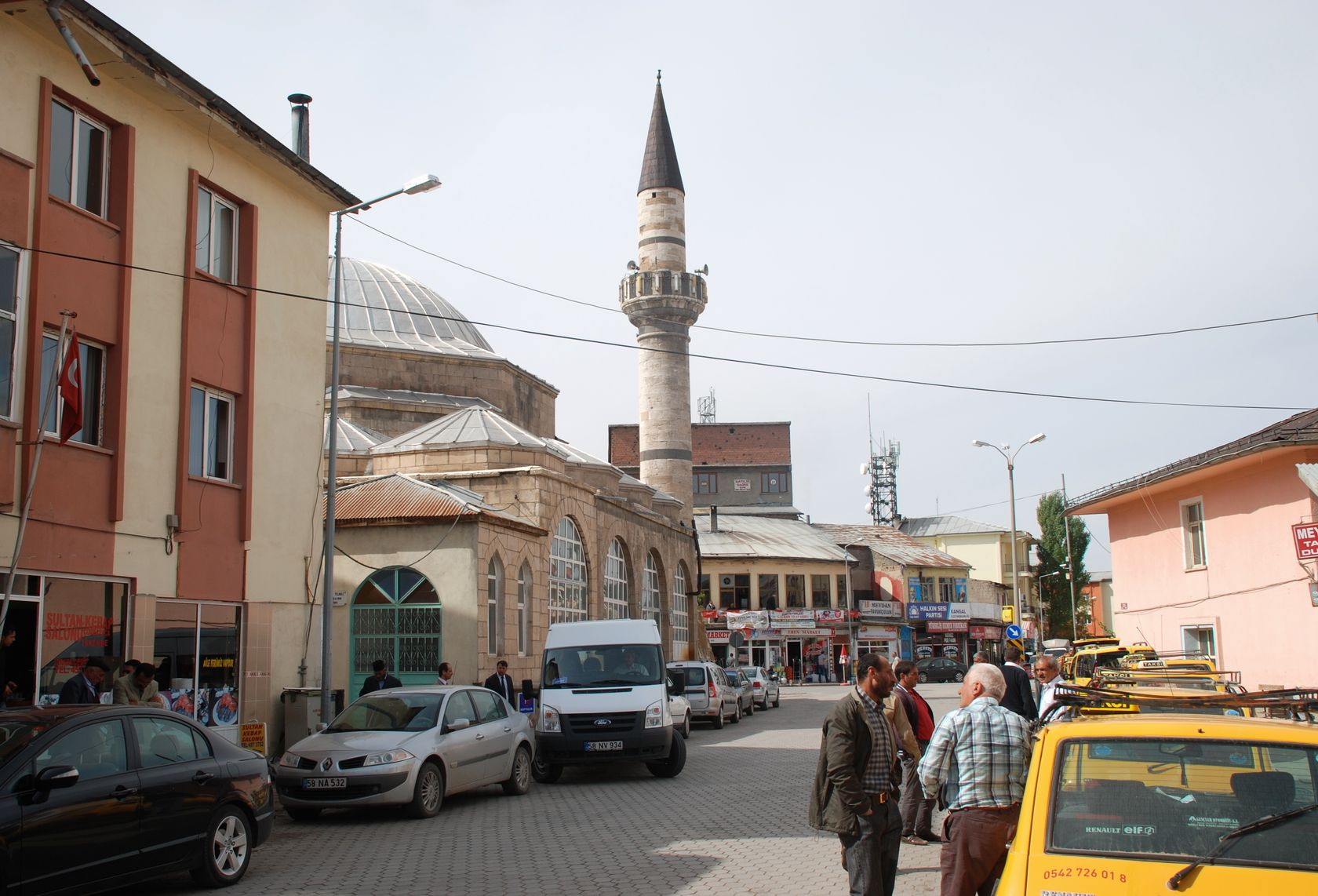
- Kangal city center

- Location within Turkey Location within Turkey Central Anatolia
- Coordinates: 39°14′12″N 37°23′19″E
- Country: Turkey
- Province: Sivas
- District: Kangal

Government
  - Mayor: Ahmet Kürşad Apaydın (BBP)
- Elevation: 1,540 m (5,050 ft)
- Population (2022): 8,948
- Time zone: UTC+3 (TRT)
- Postal code: 58900
- Area code: 0346
- Website: www.kangal.bel.tr

Kangal is a town in Sivas Province in Turkey. It is the seat of Kangal District. Its population is 8,948 (2022). The current mayor is Ahmet Kürşad Apaydın from the Great Unity Party (BBP).

== History ==
Kangal was known in the time of emperor Diocletian under the name Euspena and later during the Byzantine Empire as Spynin. The Byzantine general Eustathios Argyros was buried here in the monastery of St Elizabeth which had been constructed by his grandfather Leon. The town, known in Ottoman times as Qangal, had an Armenian church until the first massacres against the Armenians in 1895.

== Demographics ==
The town is populated by Sunni Kurds and Sunni Turks in addition to a very small Alevi and Armenian population.

== Climate ==
Kangal has a dry-summer continental climate (Köppen: Dsb). Winters are very cold, and summers are dry, with hot days and cold nights.

Climate data for Kangal (1991–2020)
Month	Jan	Feb	Mar	Apr	May	Jun	Jul	Aug	Sep	Oct	Nov	Dec	Year
Mean daily maximum °C (°F)	−0.5 (31.1)	1.3 (34.3)	7.7 (45.9)	14.2 (57.6)	19.2 (66.6)	24.2 (75.6)	28.9 (84.0)	29.5 (85.1)	24.9 (76.8)	18.2 (64.8)	9.8 (49.6)	2.3 (36.1)	15.0 (59.0)
Daily mean °C (°F)	−5.6 (21.9)	−4.4 (24.1)	1.2 (34.2)	6.9 (44.4)	11.3 (52.3)	15.4 (59.7)	19.1 (66.4)	19.2 (66.6)	14.5 (58.1)	9.0 (48.2)	2.0 (35.6)	−3.1 (26.4)	7.2 (45.0)
Mean daily minimum °C (°F)	−10.6 (12.9)	−9.7 (14.5)	−4.6 (23.7)	−0.3 (31.5)	3.4 (38.1)	6.0 (42.8)	8.4 (47.1)	8.2 (46.8)	4.2 (39.6)	0.9 (33.6)	−4.3 (24.3)	−7.9 (17.8)	−0.5 (31.1)
Average precipitation mm (inches)	33.13 (1.30)	32.52 (1.28)	40.78 (1.61)	55.1 (2.17)	58.42 (2.30)	34.62 (1.36)	10.92 (0.43)	6.82 (0.27)	15.13 (0.60)	32.75 (1.29)	29.89 (1.18)	36.03 (1.42)	386.11 (15.20)
Average precipitation days (≥ 1.0 mm)	6.3	6.2	8.1	8.9	9.2	5.5	1.8	1.6	2.5	5.5	5.6	6.5	67.7
Average relative humidity (%)	81.2	80.0	73.7	66.5	66.9	62.0	55.0	53.8	56.2	66.3	74.4	81.2	68.1
Source: NOAA

== Notable people ==
- Hüseyin Alp (1935–1983) basketball player and actor

== See also ==
- Kangal dog
- Deliktaş Tunnel, Turkey's longest railway tunnel
