= Irmak, Yahşihan =

Irmak
- Village
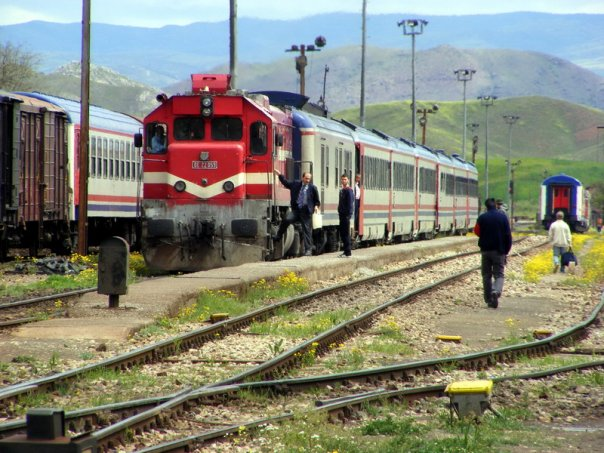
- Irmak railway station.

- Location within Turkey Location within Turkey Central Anatolia
- Coordinates: 39.9328°N 33.3890°E
- Country: Turkey
- Province: Kırıkkale
- District: Yahşihan

Government
  - Muhtar: Raşit Çayırli
- Elevation: 764 m (2,507 ft)
- Population (2022): 1,125
- Time zone: UTC+3 (TRT)
- Postal code: 71450

Irmak is a village in the Yahşihan District of Kırıkkale Province in Turkey. Its population is 1,125 (2022). Before the 2013 reorganisation, it was a town (belde).

Irmak is most notable for the railway junction located just north of the village. TCDD Taşımacılık operates two trains that stop at Irmak railway station. Once construction of the Başkentray commuter rail system in Ankara is complete, more trains will service the station. The D.200 state highway bypasses the village along its southern perimeter.

Irmak is about 12.5 km (7.8 mi) northwest of Kırıkkale, the provincial capital, and about 39.6 km (24.6 mi) east of Ankara, the capital of Turkey.
