= Divriği =

- Municipality
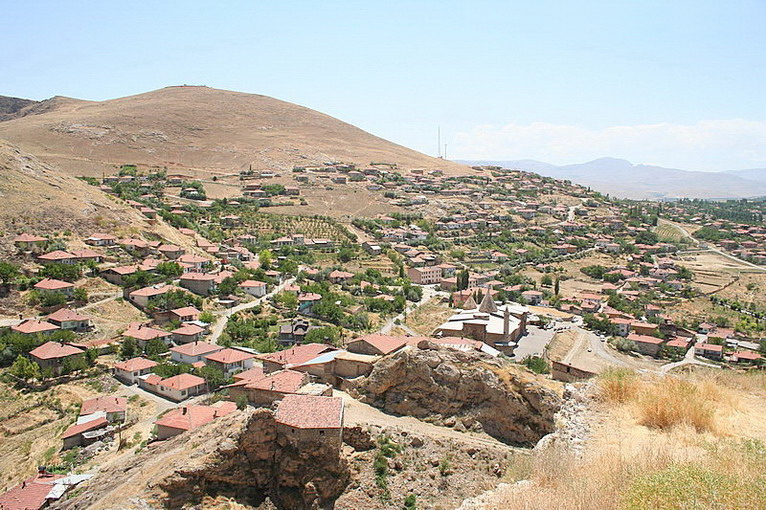

- Location within Turkey Location within Turkey Central Anatolia
- Coordinates: 39°22′N 38°07′E
- Country: Turkey
- Province: Sivas
- District: Divriği

Government
  - Mayor: Cihan Deniz Akbaş (CHP)
- Population (2022): 10,800
- Time zone: UTC+3 (TRT)
- Postal code: 58300
- Area code: 0346
- Website: www.divrigi.bel.tr

Divriği (Kurdish: Dîvrîgî; Armenian: Տեւրիկ, romanized: Tevrik) is a town of eleven thousand people in Sivas Province, Turkey, and is the district capital of Divriği District. The town lies on a gentle slope on the south bank of the Çaltısuyu river, a tributary of the Karasu river which flows into the Euphrates.

The 13th-century Great Mosque and Hospital of Divriği are on UNESCO's World Heritage List by virtue of the exquisite carvings and architecture of both buildings. There are large iron mines nearby and the town is on the Turkish rail network.

== History ==
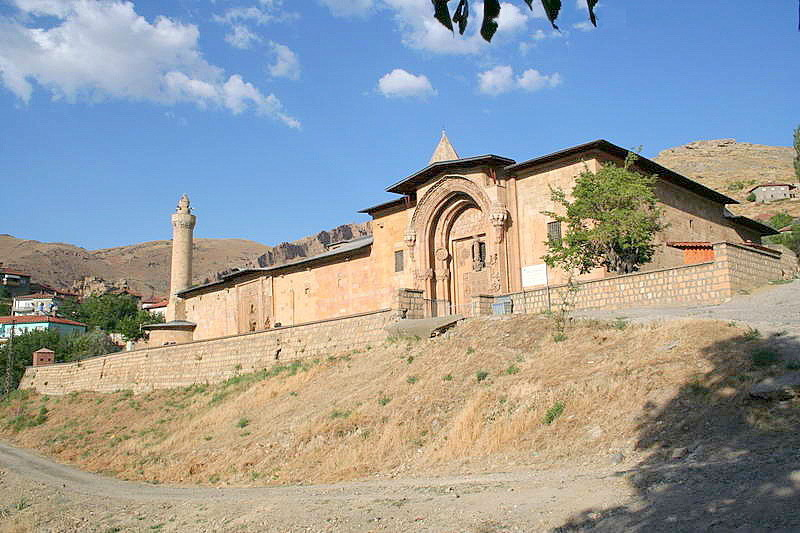
Great Mosque and Hospital of Divriği

The Hittites may have mined and made use of the iron ore in the area.

In the 9th century the town was known as Abrik and controlled by the Paulicians with the support of Arabs and the emir of Malatya. It had been founded ca. 850 by Karbeas, the leader of the Paulicians, a heretical Armenian sect. The Paulicians fortified it and used it as refuge and the capital of their state during the ninth century.

Later called Tephrike (Greek: Τεφρική) it was recaptured by the Byzantine Empire during the reign of Emperor Basil I and was temporarily named Leontokome (after Emperor Leo VI) and made into a thema. In the early eleventh century, the town was part of the territory given to the Armenian king Seneqerim-Hovhannes of Vaspurakan in exchange for his lands in Vaspurakan.

After the battle of Manzikert (present day Malazgirt), Divriği came under the control of the Sultanate of Rûm. The Mengüjeks built the Great Mosque and hospital. A medieval castle, with remains mostly from the thirteenth century, is situated on top of a steep hill overlooking the town.

== Economy ==
The railway arrived in 1937 and exports ore from iron mines which still supports the economy of the town and national economy. The Great Mosque and hospital is the main draw, and there are some other places which attract tourists.

== Climate ==
Divriği has a dry-summer continental climate (Köppen: Dsa), bordering a semi-arid climate (Köppen: BSk), with hot, dry summers, and cold, snowy winters.

Climate data for Divriği (1991–2020)
Month	Jan	Feb	Mar	Apr	May	Jun	Jul	Aug	Sep	Oct	Nov	Dec	Year
Mean daily maximum °C (°F)	2.6 (36.7)	4.6 (40.3)	11.0 (51.8)	17.3 (63.1)	22.5 (72.5)	28.1 (82.6)	32.7 (90.9)	33.2 (91.8)	28.2 (82.8)	21.0 (69.8)	11.9 (53.4)	4.9 (40.8)	18.2 (64.8)
Daily mean °C (°F)	−1.6 (29.1)	−0.1 (31.8)	5.5 (41.9)	11.1 (52.0)	15.6 (60.1)	20.4 (68.7)	24.5 (76.1)	24.8 (76.6)	20.1 (68.2)	13.9 (57.0)	6.2 (43.2)	0.7 (33.3)	11.8 (53.2)
Mean daily minimum °C (°F)	−5.0 (23.0)	−4.0 (24.8)	0.7 (33.3)	5.4 (41.7)	9.3 (48.7)	13.1 (55.6)	16.5 (61.7)	16.8 (62.2)	12.5 (54.5)	7.8 (46.0)	1.5 (34.7)	−2.5 (27.5)	6.1 (43.0)
Average precipitation mm (inches)	33.74 (1.33)	34.26 (1.35)	43.84 (1.73)	69.0 (2.72)	51.4 (2.02)	22.64 (0.89)	8.7 (0.34)	4.86 (0.19)	13.95 (0.55)	34.87 (1.37)	29.55 (1.16)	33.02 (1.30)	379.83 (14.95)
Average precipitation days (≥ 1.0 mm)	6.1	6.4	7.4	9.1	9.2	4.5	1.8	1.7	2.5	5.6	5.0	7.1	66.4
Average relative humidity (%)	73.0	69.7	61.1	56.3	56.9	49.6	42.3	41.7	43.0	54.8	65.0	73.3	57.2
Source: NOAA

== Demographics ==
About 103 of the 109 villages are populated by Alevis. The majority of the Alevi population is Turkish, with a significant Kurdish Alevi minority. Evliya Çelebi included that Divriği was made up of Greeks and Turkomans as well as Armenians and Kurds in his seyahatname.

== Notable people ==
- Nuri Demirağ
- Müslüm Doğan
- Mercan Erzincan

== Sources ==
- (Book cover) Oktay Aslanapa (1991). Anadolu'da ilk Türk mimarisi: Başlangıcı ve gelişmesi (Early Turkish architecture in Anatolia: Beginnings and development) (in Turkish). AKM Publications, Ankara. ISBN 978-975-16-0264-0.
