= Eastern Express =

Train service in Turkey

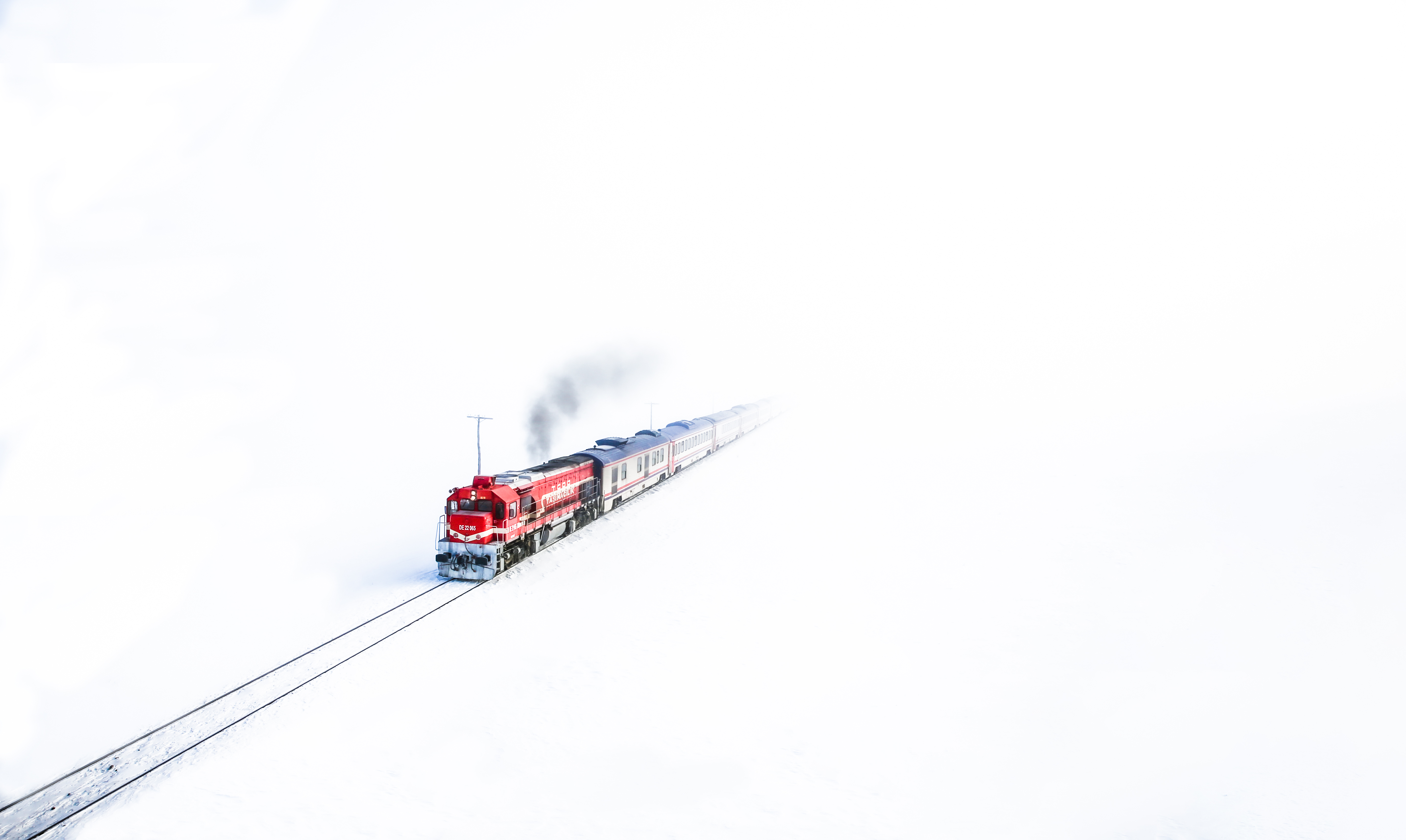

Overview
- Service type: Inter-city rail
- Status: Operating
- Locale: North-Central, Central, North-Eastern Anatolia
- First service: 1936
- Current operator: TCDD Taşımacılık
- Former operator: Turkish State Railways

Route
- Termini: Ankara railway station Kars railway station, Kars
- Stops: 47
- Distance travelled: 1,944 km (1,208 mi)
- Average journey time: 32 hours, 27 minutes (Eastbound)
- Service frequency: Daily
- Train numbers: 11410 (Eastbound); 41409 (Westbound)

On-board services
- Disabled access: Limited
- Seating arrangements: Coach
- Sleeping arrangements: 2 Couchettes; Private sleeping cars
- Catering facilities: Dining Car
- Baggage facilities: Overhead baggage storage

Technical
- Rolling stock: TVS2000
- Track gauge: 1,435 mm (4 ft 8 1/2 in)
- Electrification: Ankara-Sivas (25 kV AC)
- Operating speed: 120 km/h (75 mph) max 80 km/h (50 mph) average
- Track owner: Turkish State Railways

The Eastern Express (Turkish: Doğu Ekspresi) is an overnight passenger train operated by TCDD Taşımacılık. The train runs from Ankara to Kars. The train was the first overnight service east of Ankara. The Eastern Express stops in 7 provincial capitals: Ankara, Kırıkkale, Kayseri, Sivas, Erzincan, Erzurum and Kars. The first train ran in 1936 from Istanbul's Haydarpaşa Terminal to Çetinkaya.

Until the Ankara–Istanbul high-speed railway project, the train ran between Istanbul and Kars.

Due to the increasing popularity of the train, TCDD Taşımacılık added a second train named the Touristic Eastern Express. This new train operates three times a week with fewer stops and costs more than the regular Eastern Express train. The Touristic Eastern Express was inaugurated in 2019 from Ankara.

== History ==
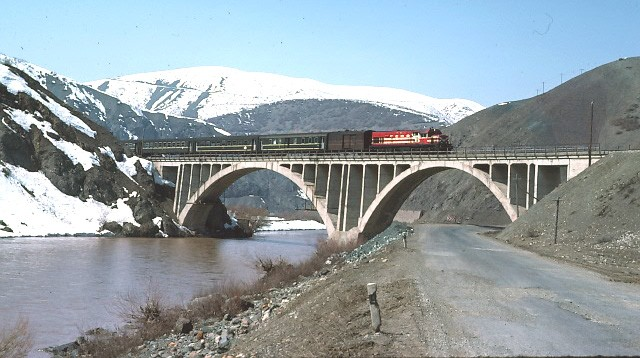
The Eastern Express crossing the Euphrates in 1976.

During the 1930s, railway construction in Turkey reached its peak, where 2,846.2 km (1,769 mi) of lines were completed. Ever since the Turkish State Railways were formed in 1927, railways extended to eastern Turkey. A main line was to be constructed from Ankara to Erzurum, where it would connect with the broad gauge line to the Turkey/Soviet Union border built by the Russian Empire in 1916. Construction of the line started in 1924 (by the CFAB, TCDD took over in 1927) and reached Kayseri in 1927, Sivas in 1930 and Çetinkaya in 1936. The Eastern Express made its first run with the opening of the line to Çetinkaya. The railway finally reached Erzurum in 1939. In the same year the Eastern Express started operating from Haydarpaşa to Erzurum. By transferring to a broad gauge train in Erzurum, passengers could travel to Kars, the last Turkish city before the Soviet Union. In 1962, the broad gauge line from Erzurum-Kars-Akkaya was made standard gauge by the State Railways. The Eastern Express was extended to Kars in 1962.

== Equipment ==
The Eastern Express had many layouts over the years. The Turkish steam locomotives were the source of power from 1936 to the 1970s when the diesel locomotive took over. The layout today is:

- DE 22 000, (Note: Sometimes DE 33 000 may be used instead) Head End Power Car, Coach, Coach, Coach, Diner, couchette, couchette, private cars at the end, helper engine if used

== Route ==
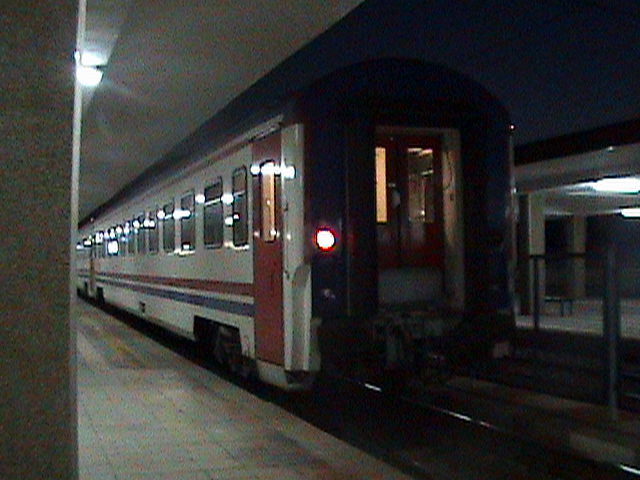
An Istanbul-bound train at Eskişehir in 2009.

Prior to the commencement of high-speed rail service from Istanbul to Ankara the train departed from Haydarpaşa Terminal on the Bosphorus and traveled along the south-eastern shores of Istanbul. The journey out of the extensive suburbs of the metropolis took an average of 45 minutes after which the train followed the Bay of İzmit coastline before reaching İzmit and then traveling across the Sakarya plain. At Arifye, the line headed south through the mountainous route towards Eskişehir. After crossing many gorges and after Bilecik, the train ascended the Anatolian plateau and arrived in Ankara.

The Eastern Express runs east through Ankara's eastern suburbs. After Kırıkkale, the train heads south-east towards Kayseri. At Kayseri the train is refuelled and has a crew change. The Eastern Express then continues east into the dusk. The route then heads north-east until Sivas, where the train has its second break. After Sivas the tracks travel through very mountainous terrain so the speed is limited. A small portion between Çetinkaya and Divriği is electrified for freight trains carrying iron ore south to the Mediterranean Sea. After Divriği the Eastern Express steadily climbs towards the Armenian Highlands. After a break in Erzurum, the train arrives in Kars in the evening.
