= Lake Van Express =

Train service in Turkey

Van Gölü Ekspresi

Overview
- Service type: Inter-city rail
- Status: Operating
- Locale: Central, Eastern Anatolia
- Current operator: TCDD Taşımacılık
- Former operator: Turkish State Railways
- Website: Van Gölü Ekspresi (in Turkish)

Route
- Termini: Ankara; Tatvan
- Distance travelled: 1,352 km (840 mi)
- Average journey time: 25 hr 50 min (to Tatvan); 25 hr 40 min (to Ankara)
- Service frequency: 2 days a week From Ankara Tuesdays and Sundays; From Tatvan Tuesdays and Thursdays

Technical
- Track gauge: 1,435 mm (4 ft 8 1/2 in)
- Operating speed: 80

The Lake Van Express or Van Lake Express (Turkish: Van Gölü Ekspresi), operated by TCDD Transport is an overnight train consisting of pullman, couchettes, sleeping and dining wagons, which runs twice a week on the Ankara-Tatvan route of over 1,300 km.

Travelling the full route takes about 26 hours.

The train previously ran between Haydarpaşa, Istanbul and Tatvan, but due to the construction of the Ankara–Istanbul high-speed railway, the service was shortened and the starting point of the journey became Ankara.

== Services ==
It runs on Tuesdays and Sundays from Ankara. There is one train service from Tatvan on Tuesdays and Thursdays.

The South Kurtulan Express runs on other days with the train going to Kurtalan instead of Van with a journey time of about 24 hours.
