= Tatvan railway station =

TATVAN
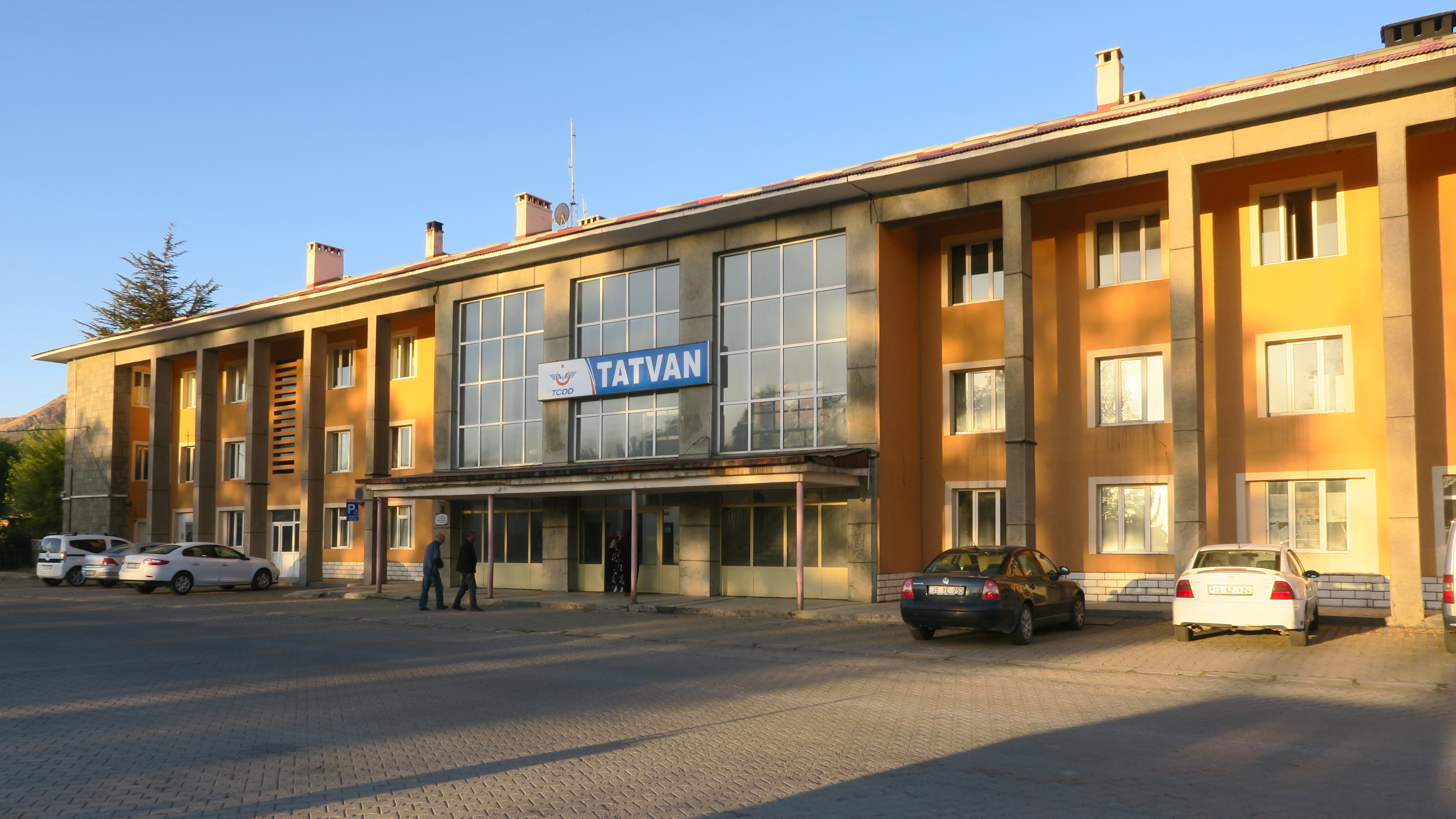

General information
- Coordinates: 38.5087°N 42.2763°E
- System: TCDD intercity and regional railway station
- Owner: Turkish State Railways
- Platforms: 1
- Tracks: 1

Construction
- Structure type: At-grade
- Parking: Yes

History
- Opened: 1964

Services
| Preceding station | TCDD Taşımacılık | Following station |
|---|---|---|
| Rahova towards Ankara | Trans-Asia Express Service suspended | Tatvan Pier Terminus |
| Rahova towards Ankara | Lake Van Express | Terminus |
| Rahova towards Elazığ | Elazığ–Tatvan | Terminus |
Location

Tatvan railway station is located in the town of Tatvan, Turkey in eastern Anatolia. It is one of two railway stations serving the town, the other one being Tatvan Pier.

Opened in 1964 by the Turkish State Railways, it is serviced by a twice-weekly intercity train, the Van Lake Express to Ankara, as well as a daily regional train to Elazığ.
