= Kars railway station =

Railway station in Kars, Turkey

KARS
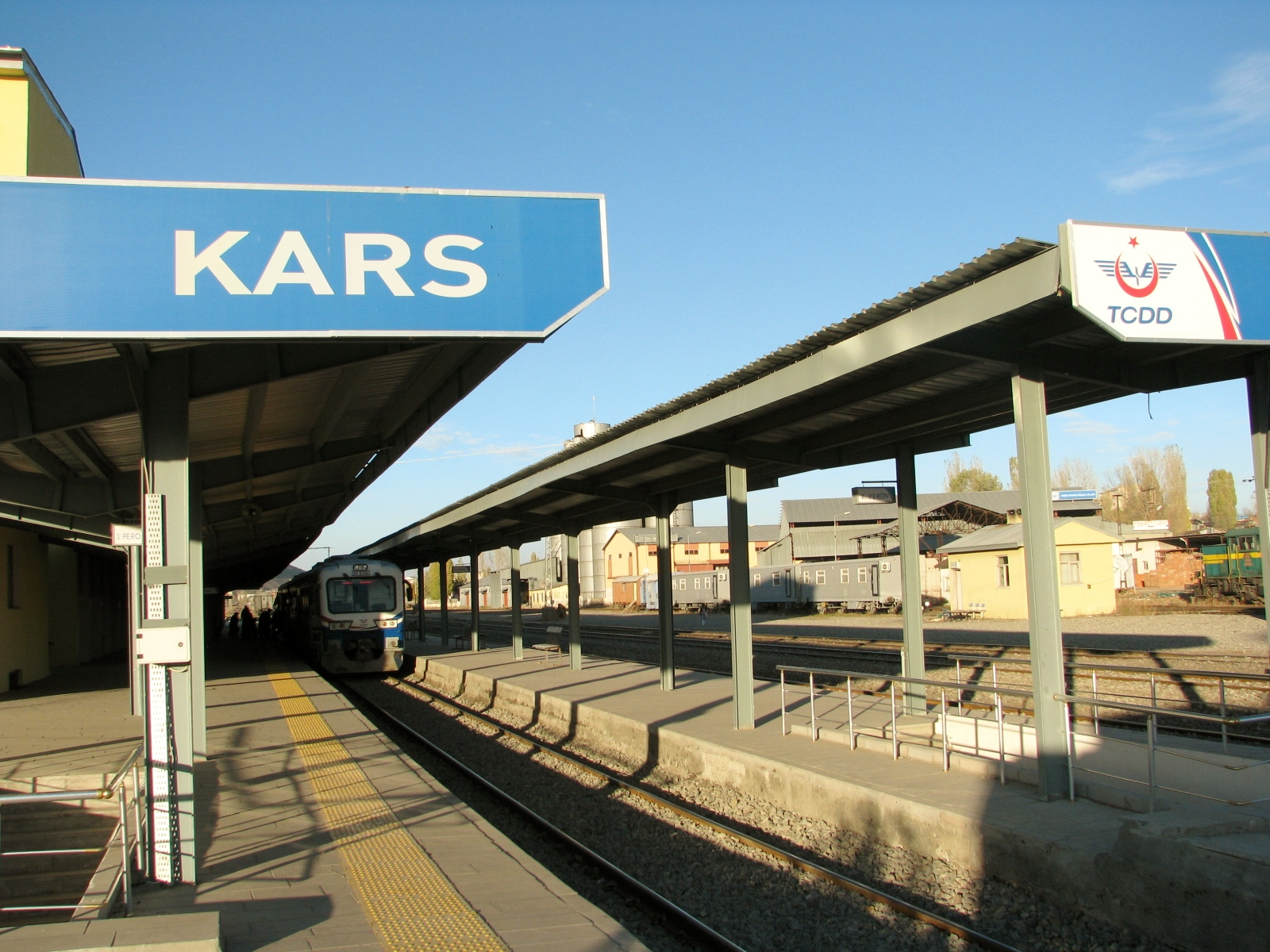

General information
- Location: Bayram Acar Sk, Kars, Turkey
- Coordinates: 40.361865°N 43.062405°E
- Owner: TCDD
- Lines: Ankara-Kars railway Kars–Gyumri–Tbilisi railway Kars-Khashuri railway
- Platforms: 2
- Tracks: 6

Construction
- Structure type: At-grade

Other information
- Status: In Operation
- Station code: 4594

History
- Opened: 1899; 127 years ago
- Rebuilt: 1962; 64 years ago

Services
Preceding station	TCDD Taşımacılık	Following station
Sarıkamış towards Ankara	Eastern Express (Tourist)	Terminus
Selim towards Ankara	Eastern Express	Terminus
Terminus	Kars–Akyaka	Mezraa towards Akyaka
Preceding station	Georgian Railway	Following station
Terminus	Baku–Tbilisi–Kars	Akhalkalaki towards Baku, Azerbaijan
Terminus	Kars–Gyumri–Tbilisi	Mezra towards Tbilisi
Location

Kars station (Turkish: Kars garı) is a railway station, serving the eastern Turkish city of Kars. It is one of the easternmost stations on the Trans-Anatolian railway. The Eastern Express services Kars once a day to Istanbul. Between 1993 and 2011, there was no train service east of Kars due to the Turkish-Armenian border closure. But as of February 2011, a regional train operates twice daily from Kars to Akyaka, the last Turkish town before the border, stopping at the Akyaka railway station.

The station was opened in 1899, by the Transcaucasus Railway, when Kars was under the rule of the Russian Empire in order to have better control over the Ottoman front. The tracks were originally standard Russian 5-foot gauge. After the Turkish War of Independence, Kars was given back to Turkey. The Turkish State Railways took over the station, but Kars remained isolated from the rest of the network until 1939, when a standard gauge line was built to Erzurum. Passengers would change to a narrow gauge train from Erzurum to Kars. The Narrow gauge line was replaced with standard gauge in 1957 and the broad gauge line was replaced in 1962.

It is the terminus of the Kars–Gyumri–Tbilisi railway, and the Baku–Tbilisi–Akhalkalaki–Kars railway.
