= Kurtalan =

Municipality in Siirt Province, Turkey

- Municipality
- Logo

- Location in Turkey
- Coordinates: 37°55′34″N 41°42′01″E
- Country: Turkey
- Province: Siirt
- District: Kurtalan

Government
  - Mayor: Baran Akgül (HDP)
- Population (2021): 36,273
- Time zone: UTC+3 (TRT)
- Website: kurtalan.bel.tr

Kurtalan (Kurdish: Misircê, Armenian: Խարզան, romanized: Xarzan or Հարզան, Harzan) is a municipality in the Kurtalan District of Siirt Province in Turkey. It was called Garzan until 1938 when it was renamed. The municipality is populated by Kurds of the Pencenarî Kurdish tribe and had a population of 36,273 in 2021.

== Demographics ==
According to Vital Cuinet, the kaza of Garzan had a population of 13,000 in 1891, including 8,800 Muslims, 3,600 Armenians, and others 600. The Muslim population were mostly Kurds. Syriac Catholics also lived in the area. With the exception of a few dozen, all Armenians were massacred during the Armenian genocide. The fate of Syriacs was similar to that of Armenians during the Syriac genocide.

Mother tongue, Garzan District, 1927 Turkish census
Turkish	Arabic	Kurdish	Circassian	Armenian	Unknown or other languages
585	736	12,739	3	0	90

Religion, Garzan District, 1927 Turkish census
Muslim	Armenian	Jewish	Other
13,407	55	1	406

== Government ==
In the local elections of 2019 Baran Akgül was elected as Mayor.

== Transport ==
In Kurtalan railway station is the eastern terminus of the Southern Kurtalan Express between Ankara and Kurtalan operated by TCDD Taşımacılık.

== See also ==
- Çömlekli, Kurtalan
