= Kurtalan railway station =

Railway station in Siirt, Turkey

KURTALAN

General information
- Location: Recep Tayyip Erdoğan Blv., Sümer Mah., 56500; Kurtalan/Siirt; Turkey
- Coordinates: 37.9281°N 41.6971°E
- System: TCDD intercity rail station
- Owner: Turkish State Railways
- Operator: TCDD Taşımacılık
- Line: Southern Express
- Platforms: 1 side platform
- Tracks: 6

Construction
- Structure type: At-grade
- Parking: Yes

History
- Opened: 1944

Services
Preceding station	TCDD Taşımacılık	Following station
Beşiri towards Ankara	Southern Express	Terminus
Location

Kurtalan railway station (Turkish: Kurtalan Garı) is the easternmost railway station in Siirt Province, Turkey. It is also the eastern terminus of the Southern Kurtalan Express which connects Ankara and Kurtalan.

Kurtalan station was opened in 1944 by the Turkish State Railways. The station was built as part of the railway from Diyarbakır to the Iranian border, via Tatvan and Van, which began in 1937. The railway reached Kurtalan in 1940, but due to the mountainous terrain around Lake Van, the route to Van was altered to begin at Elazığ, leaving Kurtalan as the eastern terminus of the railway. In 2017 the State Railways began planning a 21 km (13 mi) extension east to the provincial capital, Siirt.

TCDD Taşımacılık operates a daily intercity train to Ankara. (temporarily Irmak)
