= Ali Shah =

Ali Shah may refer to:

- Ali Shah (cricketer), Zimbabwean cricketer
- Ali Shah (Pakistani politician)
- Ali Shah (Kashmir), Sultan of Kashmir in 1585
- Ali Shah Bukhari (1914-1979), Kashmiri philosopher
- Ali Shah Chak (r. 1570–1578), Sultan of Kashmir from the Chak dynasty
- Ali-Shah Jivraj (born 1987), Indian-Ugandan businessman and entrepreneur
- Ali Shah Miri (r. 1413–1420), Sultan of Kashmir from the Shah Mir dynasty
- Ali Shah, East Azerbaijan, a city in East Azerbaijan province, Iran

== See also ==
- Alishah (disambiguation)
