= Mashnaq =

Village in East Azerbaijan province, Iran

Mashnaq Persian: مشنق
- Village
- Location within Iran
- Coordinates: 38°13′45″N 45°34′15″E
- Country: Iran
- Province: East Azerbaijan
- County: Shabestar
- District: Central
- Rural District: Guney-ye Markazi

Population (2016)
  - Total: 515
- Time zone: UTC+3:30 (IRST)

Mashnaq (Persian: مشنق) (Note: Also romanized as Meshnaq; also known as Eslāmābād-e Mashnaq, Meshnak, and Moshnegh) is a village in Guney-ye Markazi Rural District of the Central District in Shabestar County, East Azerbaijan province, Iran.

== Demographics ==
=== Population ===
At the time of the 2006 National Census, the village's population was 533 in 195 households. The following census in 2011 counted 409 people in 155 households. The 2016 census measured the population of the village as 515 people in 214 households.
