= Sareban Qoli =

Village in East Azerbaijan province, Iran

Sareban Qoli Persian: ساربانقلي
- Village
- Location within Iran
- Coordinates: 38°09′17″N 45°52′27″E
- Country: Iran
- Province: East Azerbaijan
- County: Shabestar
- District: Central
- Rural District: Sis

Population (2016)
  - Total: 1,276
- Time zone: UTC+3:30 (IRST)

Sareban Qoli (Persian: ساربانقلي) (Note: Also romanized as Sārebān Qolī and Sārebānqolī; also known as Sarvān Qolī, Sorsan Kuli, and Sorvankuli) is a village in Sis Rural District of the Central District in Shabestar County, East Azerbaijan province, Iran.

== Demographics ==
=== Population ===
At the time of the 2006 National Census, the village's population was 1,340 in 338 households. The following census in 2011 counted 1,302 people in 359 households. The 2016 census measured the population of the village as 1,276 people in 421 households.
