= Amir Zakaria =

Village in East Azerbaijan province, Iran

Amir Zakaria Persian: اميرذكريا
- Village
- Location within Iran
- Coordinates: 38°12′11″N 45°51′14″E
- Country: Iran
- Province: East Azerbaijan
- County: Shabestar
- District: Central
- Rural District: Sis

Population (2016)
  - Total: 665
- Time zone: UTC+3:30 (IRST)

Amir Zakaria (Persian: اميرذكريا) (Note: Also romanized as Amīr Z̄akareyyā, Amīr Zakarīā, Amīr Zakarīyā, and Amīr Z̄akaryā; also known as Mīrzā Karān, Mīrzā Qareh, and Mirzakeran) is a village in Sis Rural District of the Central District in Shabestar County, East Azerbaijan province, Iran.

== Demographics ==
=== Population ===
At the time of the 2006 National Census, the village's population was 952 in 284 households. The following census in 2011 counted 781 people in 250 households. The 2016 census measured the population of the village as 665 people in 229 households.
