= Dizaj Khalil =

Village in East Azerbaijan province, Iran

Dizaj Khalil Persian: ديزج خليل
- Village
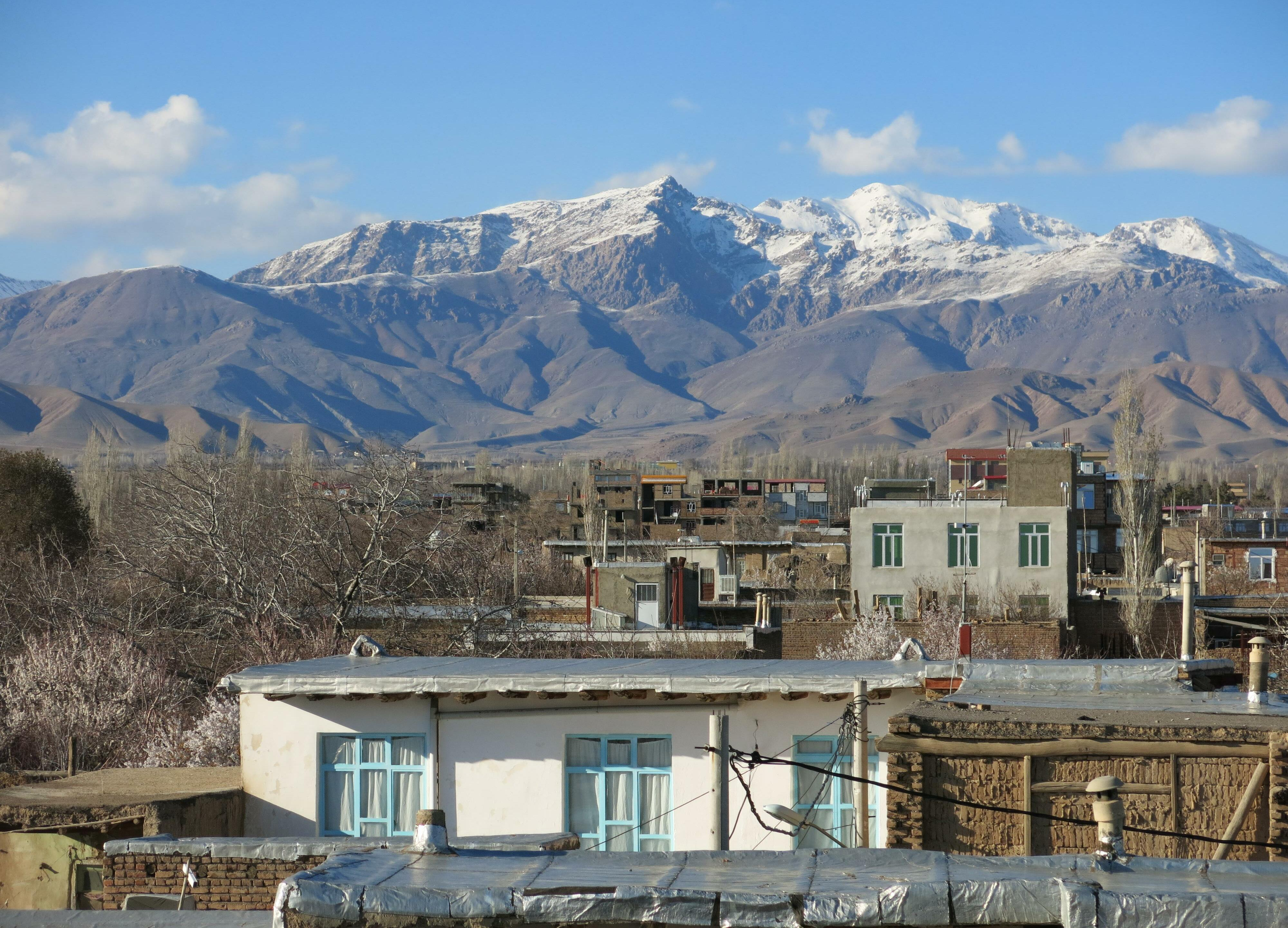
- Dizaj Khalil village at the foot of the Mt. Mishu

- Location within Iran
- Coordinates: 38°09′07″N 45°43′33″E
- Country: Iran
- Province: East Azerbaijan
- County: Shabestar
- District: Central
- Rural District: Guney-ye Sharqi

Population (2016)
  - Total: 3,137
- Time zone: UTC+3:30 (IRST)

Dizaj Khalil (Persian: ديزج خليل) (Note: Also romanized as Dīzaj Khalīl and Dīzaj-e Khalīl; also known as Dīza-Khalīl, Dizeh, and Dizeh Khalīl) is a village in Guney-ye Sharqi Rural District of the Central District in Shabestar County, East Azerbaijan province, Iran.

== Demographics ==
=== Population ===
At the time of the 2006 National Census, the village's population was 2,941 in 842 households. The following census in 2011 counted 4,048 people in 1,203 households. The 2016 census measured the population of the village as 3,137 people in 1,048 households. It was the most populous village in its rural district.
