= Kushk, East Azerbaijan =

Village in East Azerbaijan province, Iran

Kushk Persian: كوشك
- Village
- Location within Iran
- Coordinates: 38°08′09″N 45°35′16″E
- Country: Iran
- Province: East Azerbaijan
- County: Shabestar
- District: Central
- Rural District: Guney-ye Markazi

Population (2016)
  - Total: 865
- Time zone: UTC+3:30 (IRST)

Kushk (Persian: كوشك) (Note: Also romanized as Kooshk and Kūshk; also known as Keshk, Koshk, Kūshg, and Maḩalleh-ye Kūshk) is a village in Guney-ye Markazi Rural District of the Central District in Shabestar County, East Azerbaijan province, Iran.

== Demographics ==
=== Population ===
At the time of the 2006 National Census, the village's population was 625 in 157 households. The following census in 2011 counted 722 people in 222 households. The 2016 census measured the population of the village as 865 people in 282 households.
