= Zangi, East Azerbaijan =

Village in East Azerbaijan province, Iran

Zangi Persian: زنگي
- Village
- Location within Iran
- Coordinates: 38°11′02″N 45°52′57″E
- Country: Iran
- Province: East Azerbaijan
- County: Shabestar
- District: Central
- Rural District: Sis

Population (2016)
  - Total: 539
- Time zone: UTC+3:30 (IRST)

Zangi (Persian: زنگي) (Note: Also romanized as Zangī) is a village in Sis Rural District of the Central District in Shabestar County, East Azerbaijan province, Iran.

== Demographics ==
=== Population ===
At the time of the 2006 National Census, the village's population was 705 in 185 households. The following census in 2011 counted 755 people in 208 households. The 2016 census measured the population of the village as 539 people in 171 households.
