= Shangolabad, Shabestar =

Village in East Azerbaijan province, Iran

Shangolabad Persian: شنگل اباد
- Village
- Location within Iran
- Coordinates: 38°08′30″N 45°39′26″E
- Country: Iran
- Province: East Azerbaijan
- County: Shabestar
- District: Central
- Rural District: Guney-ye Markazi

Population (2016)
  - Total: 699
- Time zone: UTC+3:30 (IRST)

Shangolabad (Persian: شنگل اباد) (Note: Also romanized as Shangolābād and Shengelābād; also known as Shangool Abadé Arvanagh and Shingilabad) is a village in Guney-ye Markazi Rural District of the Central District in Shabestar County, East Azerbaijan province, Iran.

== Demographics ==
=== Population ===
At the time of the 2006 National Census, the village's population was 426 in 124 households. The following census in 2011 counted 630 people in 196 households. The 2016 census measured the population of the village as 699 people in 221 households.
