= Yusofabad, Shabestar =

Village in East Azerbaijan province, Iran

Yusofabad Persian: يوسف اباد
- Village
- Location within Iran
- Coordinates: 38°08′58″N 45°33′02″E
- Country: Iran
- Province: East Azerbaijan
- County: Shabestar
- District: Central
- Rural District: Guney-ye Markazi

Population (2016)
  - Total: 840
- Time zone: UTC+3:30 (IRST)

Yusofabad (Persian: يوسف اباد) (Note: also romanized as Yusefabad, Yūsefābād and Yūsofābād; also known as Maḩalleh-ye Mojāver-e Ḩeşār) is a village in Guney-ye Markazi Rural District of the Central District in Shabestar County, East Azerbaijan province, Iran.

== Demographics ==
=== Population ===
At the time of the 2006 National Census, the village's population was 362 in 92 households. The following census in 2011 counted 331 people in 99 households. The 2016 census measured the population of the village as 840 people in 255 households.
