= Nowjeh Deh, Shabestar =

Village in East Azerbaijan province, Iran

Nowjeh Deh Persian: نوجه ده
- Village
- Location within Iran
- Coordinates: 38°10′32″N 45°43′58″E
- Country: Iran
- Province: East Azerbaijan
- County: Shabestar
- District: Central
- Rural District: Guney-ye Sharqi

Population (2016)
  - Total: 859
- Time zone: UTC+3:30 (IRST)

Nowjeh Deh (Persian: نوجه ده) (Note: Also known as Novādi, Novady, Nowqadī, and Nūrī) is a village in Guney-ye Sharqi Rural District of the Central District in Shabestar County, East Azerbaijan province, Iran.

== Demographics ==
=== Population ===
At the time of the 2006 National Census, the village's population was 571 in 187 households. The following census in 2011 counted 566 people in 196 households. The 2016 census measured the population of the village as 659 people in 301 households.
