= Malekzadeh =

Village in East Azerbaijan province, Iran

Malekzadeh Persian: ملك زاده
- Village
- Location within Iran
- Coordinates: 38°10′50″N 45°50′53″E
- Country: Iran
- Province: East Azerbaijan
- County: Shabestar
- District: Central
- Rural District: Sis

Population (2016)
  - Total: 1,122
- Time zone: UTC+3:30 (IRST)

Malekzadeh (Persian: ملك زاده) (Note: Also romanized as Malekzādeh; also known as Malakzāden) is a village in Sis Rural District of the Central District in Shabestar County, East Azerbaijan province, Iran.

== Demographics ==
=== Population ===
At the time of the 2006 National Census, the village's population was 957 in 219 households. The following census in 2011 counted 1,253 people in 386 households. The 2016 census measured the population of the village as 1,122 people in 323 households.
