= Beygjeh Khatun =

Village in East Azerbaijan province, Iran

Beygjeh Khatun Persian: بيگجه خاتون
- Village
- Location within Iran
- Coordinates: 38°09′57″N 45°49′57″E
- Country: Iran
- Province: East Azerbaijan
- County: Shabestar
- District: Central
- Rural District: Sis

Population (2016)
  - Total: 635
- Time zone: UTC+3:30 (IRST)

Beygjeh Khatun (Persian: بيگجه خاتون) (Note: Also romanized as Beygjeh Khātūn; also known as Bech-Khanum, Besh Khanom, Besh Khānum, Beygī Khātūn, Bīgjah Khānūn, Yengejeh Khātūn, and Yengejeh-ye Khātūn) is a village in Sis Rural District of the Central District in Shabestar County, East Azerbaijan province, Iran.

== Demographics ==
=== Population ===
At the time of the 2006 National Census, the village's population was 707 in 193 households. The following census in 2011 counted 628 people in 181 households. The 2016 census measured the population of the village as 635 people in 207 households.
