= Aq Kahriz, East Azerbaijan =

Village in East Azerbaijan province, Iran

Aq Kahriz Persian: اق كهريز
- Village
- Location within Iran
- Coordinates: 38°09′20″N 45°47′39″E
- Country: Iran
- Province: East Azerbaijan
- County: Shabestar
- District: Central
- Rural District: Sis

Population (2016)
  - Total: 214
- Time zone: UTC+3:30 (IRST)

Aq Kahriz (Persian: اق كهريز) (Note: Also romanized as Āq Kahrīz; also known as Tāzeh Kand) is a village in Sis Rural District of the Central District in Shabestar County, East Azerbaijan province, Iran.

== Demographics ==
=== Population ===
At the time of the 2006 National Census, the village's population was 261 in 68 households. The following census in 2011 counted 248 people in 68 households. The 2016 census measured the population of the village as 214 people in 73 households.
