= Darvish Baqqal =

Village in East Azerbaijan province, Iran

Darvish Baqqal Persian: درويش بقال
- Village
- Location within Iran
- Coordinates: 38°09′44″N 45°51′04″E
- Country: Iran
- Province: East Azerbaijan
- County: Shabestar
- District: Central
- Rural District: Sis

Population (2016)
  - Total: 747
- Time zone: UTC+3:30 (IRST)

Darvish Baqqal (Persian: درويش بقال) (Note: Also romanized as Darvīsh Baqqāl; also known as Darvish Baghghal and Dashpakal) is a village in Sis Rural District of the Central District in Shabestar County, East Azerbaijan province, Iran.

== Demographics ==
=== Population ===
At the time of the 2006 National Census, the village's population was 613 in 144 households. The following census in 2011 counted 700 people in 207 households. The 2016 census measured the population of the village as 747 people in 241 households.
