= Ali Beyglu =

Ali Beyglu or Alibeyglu (Persian: علي بيگلو), also rendered as Alibeglu, may refer to:

- Ali Beyglu, Meyaneh, East Azerbaijan Province
- Ali Beyglu, Shabestar, East Azerbaijan Province
- Ali Beyglu, Miandoab, West Azerbaijan Province
- Alibeyglu, Urmia, West Azerbaijan Province
- Ali Beygluy (disambiguation)
