= Gholamlu =

Village in East Azerbaijan province, Iran

Gholamlu Persian: غلاملو
- Village
- Location within Iran
- Coordinates: 38°10′22″N 45°50′03″E
- Country: Iran
- Province: East Azerbaijan
- County: Shabestar
- District: Central
- Rural District: Sis

Population (2016)
  - Total: 490
- Time zone: UTC+3:30 (IRST)

Gholamlu (Persian: غلاملو) (Note: Also romanized as Gholāmlū; also known as Shalāmlū) is a village in Sis Rural District of the Central District in Shabestar County, East Azerbaijan province, Iran.

== Demographics ==
=== Population ===
At the time of the 2006 National Census, the village's population was 388 in 103 households. The following census in 2011 counted 297 people in 94 households. The 2016 census measured the population of the village as 490 people in 140 households.
