= Zinab =

Village in East Azerbaijan province, Iran

Zinab Persian: زيناب
- Village
- Location within Iran
- Coordinates: 38°09′10″N 45°52′51″E
- Country: Iran
- Province: East Azerbaijan
- County: Shabestar
- District: Central
- Rural District: Sis

Population (2016)
  - Total: 1,036
- Time zone: UTC+3:30 (IRST)

Zinab (Persian: زيناب) (Note: Also romanized as Zīnāb) is a village in Sis Rural District of the Central District in Shabestar County, East Azerbaijan province, Iran.

== Demographics ==
=== Population ===
At the time of the 2006 National Census, the village's population was 1,257 in 281 households. The following census in 2011 counted 1,184 people in 297 households. The 2016 census measured the population of the village as 1,036 people in 332 households.
