= Shanejan =

Village in East Azerbaijan province, Iran

Shanejan Persian: شانجان
- Village
- Location within Iran
- Coordinates: 38°13′33″N 45°42′53″E
- Country: Iran
- Province: East Azerbaijan
- County: Shabestar
- District: Central
- Rural District: Guney-ye Sharqi

Population (2016)
  - Total: 571
- Time zone: UTC+3:30 (IRST)

Shanejan (Persian: شانجان) (Note: Also romanized as Shānejān and Shānjān; also known as Chakawān, Chana‘vān, and Keyvān) is a village in Guney-ye Sharqi Rural District of the Central District in Shabestar County, East Azerbaijan province, Iran.

== Demographics ==
=== Population ===
At the time of the 2006 National Census, the village's population was 338 in 111 households. The following census in 2011 counted 356 people in 102 households. The 2016 census measured the population of the village as 571 people in 199 households.

== Notes ==
• The US (United States) Later struck this area in 2026
