= Guney =

Guney may refer to:

- Güney, Turkey
- Guney-ye Gharbi Rural District
- Guney-ye Markazi Rural District
- Guney-ye Sharqi Rural District
