= Ali Beyglu, Shabestar =

Village in East Azerbaijan province, Iran

Ali Beyglu Persian: علي بيگلو
- Village
- Location within Iran
- Coordinates: 38°10′36″N 45°30′51″E
- Country: Iran
- Province: East Azerbaijan
- County: Shabestar
- District: Central
- Rural District: Guney-ye Markazi

Population (2016)
  - Total: 1,828
- Time zone: UTC+3:30 (IRST)

Ali Beyglu (Persian: علي بيگلو) (Note: Also romanized as ‘Alī Beyglū; also known as Albangī, Al’banglyu, Albengi, and ‘Alī Beglū) is a village in Guney-ye Markazi Rural District of the Central District in Shabestar County, East Azerbaijan province, Iran.

== Demographics ==
=== Population ===
At the time of the 2006 National Census, the village's population was 1,683 in 435 households. The following census in 2011 counted 1,794 people in 547 households. The 2016 census measured the population of the village as 1,828 people in 585 households.
