= 2021 KAIF Trophy =

Tournament details
- Host country: Austria
- Dates: 5–8 August 2021
- Teams: 6 (from 6 associations)
- Venue: 1 (in 1 host city)

Final positions
- Champions: (Germany) FFC Turbine Potsdam (1st title)
- Runners-up: (Spain) Real Madrid

Tournament statistics
- Matches played: 8
- Goals scored: 28 (3.5 per match)
- Top scorer(s): (Germany) Dina Orschmann (Turbind Potsdam) (Spain) Rocío Gálvez (Real Madrid) (Germany) Selina Cerci (Turbine Potsdam) (Germany) Merle Barth (Turbine Potsdam) (2 goals each)

The 2021 KAIF Trophy was the 1st edition of the KAIF Trophy, is a women's club football tournament organised and hosted by the AFA for the women's clubs of association nations. This edition will held from 5–8 August 2021 in Austria. Sponsored by KAIF Energy.

== Participants ==
The following six team's are participating in inaugural tournament.

Team	Appearances	Previous best performance
(Czech Republic) AC Sparta Praha	1st	n/a
(Austria) FC Wacker Innsbruck	1st	n/a
(Germany) FFC Turbine Potsdam	1st	n/a
(Spain) Real Madrid	1st	n/a
(Portugal) S.L Benfica	1st	n/a
Austria Wien	1st	n/a äh

== Venue ==
All matches are played at Donawitz Stadium located in Leoben, Austria.

Leoben	2021 KAIF Trophy is located in Austria
Donawitz Stadium	2021 KAIF Trophy is located in Austria
Capacity: 6,000	2021 KAIF Trophy is located in Austria

== Draw ==
The draw of the tournament was held on 27 July 2021 at Leoben, Austria. The six participants will contest in round Robin league for the trophy.

== Group stage ==
Tie-breaking criteria for group play
The ranking of teams in each group was based on the following criteria:
1. Number of points obtained in games between the teams involved
2. Goal difference in games between the teams involved
3. Goals scored in games between the teams involved
4. Away goals scored in games between the teams involved
5. Goal difference in all games
6. Goals scored in all games
7. Drawing of lots

Key to colour in group tables
The top finisher from group will qualify for the Final

Pos	Team	Pld	W	D	L	GF	GA	GD	Pts	Qualification
1	(Germany) FFC Turbine Potsdam	2	2	0	0	8	0	+8	6	Final
2	(Spain) Real Madrid	2	2	0	0	6	0	+6	6	Final
3	(Portugal) SL Benfica	2	1	0	1	3	2	+1	3	Third place match
4	(Czech Republic) AC Sparta Praha	2	1	0	1	5	3	+2	3	Third place match
5	(Austria) FC Wacker Innsbruck	2	0	0	2	0	5	−5	0	
6	Austria Wien (H)	2	0	0	2	0	9	−9	0	

Source: Soccerway
(H) Hosts
5 August 2021
17:00 UTC+2

Austria Wien	0–6	(Germany) Turbine Potsdam
	Report	D. Orschmann 9', 62'; S. Cerci 11'; M. Platter 13'; M. Barth 64'; A. Gerhardt 64'

Donawitz Stadium, Leoben
5 August 2021
19:30 UTC+2

Real Madrid (Spain)	3–0	(Czech Republic) AC Sparta Praha
M. Cardona 21'; K. Robles 37'; R. Gálvez 45'	Report

Donawitz Stadium, Leoben

6 August 2021
17:00 UTC+2

SL Benfica (Portugal)	0–2	(Germany) Turbine Potsdam
	Report	M. Kössler 14'; N. Ehegötz 69'

Donawitz Stadium, Leoben
6 August 2021
19:30 UTC+2

Real Madrid (Spain)	3–0	(Austria) FC FC Wacker Innsbruck
R. Gálvez 83'; O. Carmona 88' (pen.); L. Navarro 90'	Report

Donawitz Stadium, Leoben

7 August 2021
17:00 UTC+2

AC Sparta Praha (Czech Republic)	5–0	(Austria) FC Wacker Innsbruck
	Report

Donawitz Stadium, Leoben
7 August 2021
19:30 UTC+2

Austria Wien	0–3	(Portugal) SL Benfica
	Report

Donawitz Stadium, Leoben

== Third place match ==
8 August 2021
15:00 UTC+2

AC Sparta Praha (Czech Republic)	1–2	(Portugal) SL Benfica
	Report

Donawitz Stadium, Leoben

== Final ==
8 August 2021
17:30 UTC+2

Turbine Potsdam (Germany)	3–0	(Spain) Real Madrid
S. Cerci 42'; K. Holmgaard 50'; M. Barth 79' (pen.)	Report

Donawitz Stadium, Leoben

== Statistics ==
=== Goalscorers ===
There have been 28 goals scored in 8 matches, for an average of 3.5 goals per match.

2 goals

- (Spain) Rocío Gálvez (Real Madrid)
- (Germany) Dina Orschmann (Turbine Potsdam)
- (Germany) Selina Cerci (Turbine Potsdam)
- (Germany) Merle Barth (Turbine Potsdam)

1 goal

- (Germany) Maria Platter (Turbine Potsdam)
- (Germany) Anna Gerhardt (Turbine Potsdam)
- (Spain) Lorena Navarro (Real Madrid)
- (Mexico) Kenti Robles (Real Madrid)
- (Spain) Marta Cardona (Real Madrid)
- (Germany) Melissa Kössler (Turbine Potsdam)
- (Germany) Nina Ehegötz (Turbine Potsdam)
- (Spain) Olga Carmona (Real Madrid)
- (Denmark) Karen Holmgaard (Turbine Potsdam)
