= Alishah =

Alishah or Ali Shah (Persian: عليشاه) may refer to:

- Ali Shah, East Azerbaijan
- Alishah, Kurdistan
- Alishah, Lorestan
- Alishah, North Khorasan
- Omid Alishah, Iranian footballer
