= Benis =

Village in East Azerbaijan province, Iran

Benis Persian: بنیس
- Village
- Location within Iran
- Coordinates: 38°12′46″N 45°43′44″E
- Country: Iran
- Province: East Azerbaijan
- County: Shabestar
- District: Central
- Rural District: Guney-ye Sharqi

Government
  - Mayor: Abdullah Benishiddin

Population (2016)
  - Total: 709
- Time zone: UTC+3:30 (IRST)

Benis (Persian: بنیس, pronounced [bæˈniːs]) (Note: Also romanized as Banis, Beniss, Bennis, Benīz, Biniz, and Benus; Azerbaijani: Bennis) is a village in Guney-ye Sharqi Rural District of the Central District in Shabestar County, East Azerbaijan province, Iran.

== Demographics ==
=== Population ===
At the time of the 2006 National Census, the village's population was 1,422 in 455 households. The following census in 2011 counted 1,008 people in 331 households. The 2016 census measured the population of the village as 709 people in 296 households.

== Structure and history ==
The layout of Benis is centralized; the village is surrounded by nearby mountains, which supply a stream that feeds into a local aqueduct. The aqueduct waters local gardens and greenery. There is a mosque, public bath, and various shops located around the village square. A main asphalt road leads south out of the village into the rest of Shabestar County.

During the summer, the population of Benis increases significantly. Agriculture has been a local industry in Benis for many years, and continues to grow. In the 19th century, most migrations from the village were to foreign cities such as Istanbul, Baku, and Tbilisi. After the Russian Revolution, more immigration took place from Benis across the country and into cities such as Abadan, Ahvaz and Tehran. Many workers are chiefly active in the businesses of confectionery production and the processing of paper.
