= Ali Asghar Rahimi Azad =

Iranian Grand Ayatollah (1936–2024)

- Ayatollah Ali Asghar Rahimi Azad
- Title: Grand Ayatollah

Personal life
- Born: 1936 Benis, Iran
- Era: Modern era
- Region: Iran
- Website: www.rahimi-azad.org

Religious life
- Religion: Islam
- Jurisprudence: Ja`fari

Grand Ayatollah Ali Asghar Rahimi Azad (Persian: علی اصغر رحیمی آزاد) (born 1936) was an Iranian Twelver Shi'a Marja.

Rahimi Azad published a personal Resalah. His office was in Qom.

== Early life and education ==
Ali Asghar Rahimi Azad was born in 1936 in Benis, near Shabestar, into a religious family. After studying at the Tabriz Seminary, he went to Qom to continue his studies. There, he studied jurisprudence and principles under scholars such as Hossein Borujerdi, Kazem Shariatmadari, and Mohammad Ruhani. For many years, he taught jurisprudence, Islamic principles, and religious studies in Qom. He was also active in religious and social activities in Tehran and Benis.

== Works ==
Among his works are Resalah Towzih al-Masael and Manasik Hajj. He also wrote about Quranic legal verses, Islamic history, and Forty Hadith. These works remained handwritten and were not published.

== Death ==
Rahimi Azad died in Qom on 12 August 2024, and was buried in the in the city's Baqi' Cemetery.

== See also ==
- List of maraji
