= Kafi ol Molk =

Village in East Azerbaijan province, Iran

Kafi ol Molk Persian: کافی‌الملک
- Village
- Location within Iran
- Coordinates: 38°08′23″N 45°34′16″E
- Country: Iran
- Province: East Azerbaijan
- County: Shabestar
- District: Central
- Rural District: Guney-ye Markazi

Population (2016)
  - Total: 1,251
- Time zone: UTC+3:30 (IRST)

Kafi ol Molk (Persian: کافی‌الملک) (Note: Also romanized as Kāfī el Molk, Kāfī ol Melak, and Kāfī ol Molk; also known as Kafal’myul’k, Kaflomolk, Kaif al Mulk, and Maḩalleh-ye Kāfī ol Malek) is a village in Guney-ye Markazi Rural District of the Central District in Shabestar County, East Azerbaijan province, Iran.

== Demographics ==
=== Population ===
At the time of the 2006 National Census, the village's population was 1,340 in 415 households. The following census in 2011 counted 1,225 people in 433 households. The 2016 census measured the population of the village as 1,251 people in 440 households.
