= Daryan, East Azerbaijan =

City in East Azerbaijan province, Iran

Daryan Persian: داریان
- City
- Location within Iran
- Coordinates: 38°12′59″N 45°37′39″E
- Country: Iran
- Province: East Azerbaijan
- County: Shabestar
- District: Central
- Established as a city: 2019

Population (2016)
  - Total: 4,138
- Time zone: UTC+3:30 (IRST)

Daryan (Persian: داریان) (Note: Also romanized as Dāreyān, Dārīān, Dārīyān, Dāryān, Daryān, and Daryon) is a city the Central District of Shabestar County, East Azerbaijan province, Iran. The main source of income for families is agriculture and farming.

== Demographics ==
=== Population ===
At the time of the 2006 National Census, Daryan's population was 2,220 in 691 households, when it was a village in Guney-ye Markazi Rural District. The following census in 2011 counted 3,954 people in 1,207 households. The 2016 census measured the population of the village as 4,138 people in 1,242 households. It was the most populous village in its rural district.

Daryan was converted to a city in 2019.

== Points of interest ==
- Yas Darreh: The village has a small lake and a small fountain
- Soltanabad: A very small village nearby full of almond trees
