= Yukan (disambiguation) =

Yukan is a place name in Koumala, Queensland, Australia.

Yukan or Yūkan may also refer to:

- Enchanting View (幽観, yūkan)
- Yūkan Club, a Japanese manga
- Yukan Losing (張祖鈞), an Atayal Taiwanese male artist
- Masha Pan (潘君侖, Atayal name: Yukan Temu), an Atayal Taiwanese male artist
- Kuzeh Yukan, a city in the Central District of Shabestar County, East Azerbaijan province, Iran
- Matsui Yūkan (松井友閑), a general of the Sengoku period in Japan
