= Ali Beygluy =

Ali Beygluy (Persian: علي بيگلوي), also rendered as Ali Beyglu or Alibeyglu, may refer to:

- Ali Beygluy-e Olya
- Ali Beygluy-e Sofla
