= Sis Rural District =

Sis Rural District (Persian: دهستان سيس) may refer to:

- Sis Rural District (Shabestar County)
- Sis Rural District (Kurdistan Province)
