= Kaif =

Name list

Kaif is a masculine given name and surname of Arabic origin. Notable people with the name include:

== Given name ==
- Kaif Ahmed (born 1997), Indian cricketer
- Kaif Bhopali (1917–1991), Indian Urdu poet and lyricist
- Kaif Ghaury (born 1964), Indian cricketer
- Kaif Ghaznavi, Pakistani actress and director of cultural festivals
- Kaif Raza Khan (born 2001), Indian Islamic scholar, cleric, and activist

== Surname ==
- Katrina Kaif (born 1983), British film actress and model
- Mohammad Kaif (born 1980), Indian cricketer

== See also ==
- Aivan-i-Kaif, city in and capital of Eyvanki District, Garmsar County, Semnan Province, Iran
- Tel Kaif District, a district in Ninawa Governorate, Iraq
- Tel Kaif, an Assyrian town in northern Iraq
- Kaif al Mulk, a village in Guney-ye Markazi Rural District, East Azerbaijan Province, Iran
- KAIF Trophy, an annual international women's association football club competition
