= Kauf =

Kauf is a surname. Notable people with the surname include:

- Bob Kauf (1942–1999), American racing driver
- Jaelin Kauf (born 1996), American freestyle skier
- Rüdiger Kauf (born 1975), German footballer

== See also ==
- Kaif
- Kauf (musician), American musician
