= Ali Beygluy-e Olya =

Ali Beygluy-e Olya علي بيگلوي عليا
- Village
- Location within Iran
- Coordinates: 36°53′51″N 46°57′41″E
- Country: Iran
- Province: East Azerbaijan
- County: Charuymaq
- Bakhsh: Central
- Rural District: Charuymaq-e Jonubegharbi

Population (2006)
  - Total: 116
- Time zone: UTC+3:30 (IRST)
  - Summer (DST): UTC+4:30 (IRDT)

Ali Beygluy-e Olya (Persian: علي بيگلوي عليا, also Romanized as ‘Alī Beyglūy-e ‘Olyā; also known as ‘Alī Beyglū-ye ‘Olyā and ‘Alībeyglū-ye ‘Olyā) is a village in Charuymaq-e Jonubegharbi Rural District, in the Central District of Charuymaq County, East Azerbaijan Province, Iran. At the 2006 census, its population was 116, in 21 families.
