= Guney-ye Markazi Rural District =

Rural district in East Azerbaijan province, Iran

Guney-ye Markazi Rural District Persian: دهستان گوني مركزئ
- Rural District
- Location within Iran
- Coordinates: 38°10′N 45°28′E
- Country: Iran
- Province: East Azerbaijan
- County: Shabestar
- District: Central

Population (2016)
  - Total: 10,136
- Time zone: UTC+3:30 (IRST)

Guney-ye Markazi Rural District (Persian: دهستان گوني مركزئ) is in the Central District of Shabestar County, East Azerbaijan province, Iran.

== Demographics ==
=== Population ===
At the time of the 2006 National Census, the rural district's population was 7,189 in 2,109 households. There were 9,065 inhabitants in 2,859 households at the following census of 2011. The 2016 census measured the population of the rural district as 10,136 in 3,239 households. The most populous of its seven villages was Daryan (now a city), with 4,138 people.

=== Other villages in the rural district ===
- Ali Beyglu
- Kafi ol Molk
- Kushk
- Mashnaq
- Shangolabad
- Yusofabad
