= Sis Rural District (Shabestar County) =

Rural district in East Azerbaijan province, Iran

Sis Rural District Persian: دهستان سيس
- Rural District
- Location within Iran
- Coordinates: 38°09′N 45°50′E
- Country: Iran
- Province: East Azerbaijan
- County: Shabestar
- District: Central

Population (2016)
  - Total: 9,734
- Time zone: UTC+3:30 (IRST)

Sis Rural District (Persian: دهستان سيس) is in the Central District of Shabestar County, East Azerbaijan province, Iran.

== Demographics ==
=== Population ===
At the time of the 2006 National Census, the rural district's population was 9,829 in 2,521 households. There were 10,899 inhabitants in 3,127 households at the following census of 2011. The 2016 census measured the population of the rural district as 9,734 in 3,139 households. The most populous of its 10 villages was Ali Shah (now a city), with 3,010 people.

=== Other villages in the rural district ===
- Amir Zakaria
- Aq Kahriz
- Beygjeh Khatun
- Darvish Baqqal
- Gholamlu
- Malekzadeh
- Sareban Qoli
- Zangi
- Zinab
