= Shendabad =

City in East Azerbaijan province, Iran

Shendabad Persian: شندآباد
- City
- Location within Iran
- Coordinates: 38°08′39″N 45°37′45″E
- Country: Iran
- Province: East Azerbaijan
- County: Shabestar
- District: Central

Population (2016)
  - Total: 8,489
- Time zone: UTC+3:30 (IRST)

Shendabad (Persian: شندآباد) (Note: Also romanized as Shendābād; formerly Shindavar (شيندِوار), also romanized as Shīndevār, Shindivar, Shindiwār, and Shindyvar) is a city in the Central District of Shabestar County, East Azerbaijan province, Iran.

== Demographics ==
=== Population ===
At the time of the 2006 National Census, the city's population was 8,797 in 2,220 households. The following census in 2011 counted 9,034 people in 2,474 households. The 2016 census measured the population of the city as 8,489 people in 2,703 households.
