= Sharafkhaneh =

City in East Azerbaijan province, Iran

Sharafkhaneh Persian: شرفخانه
- City
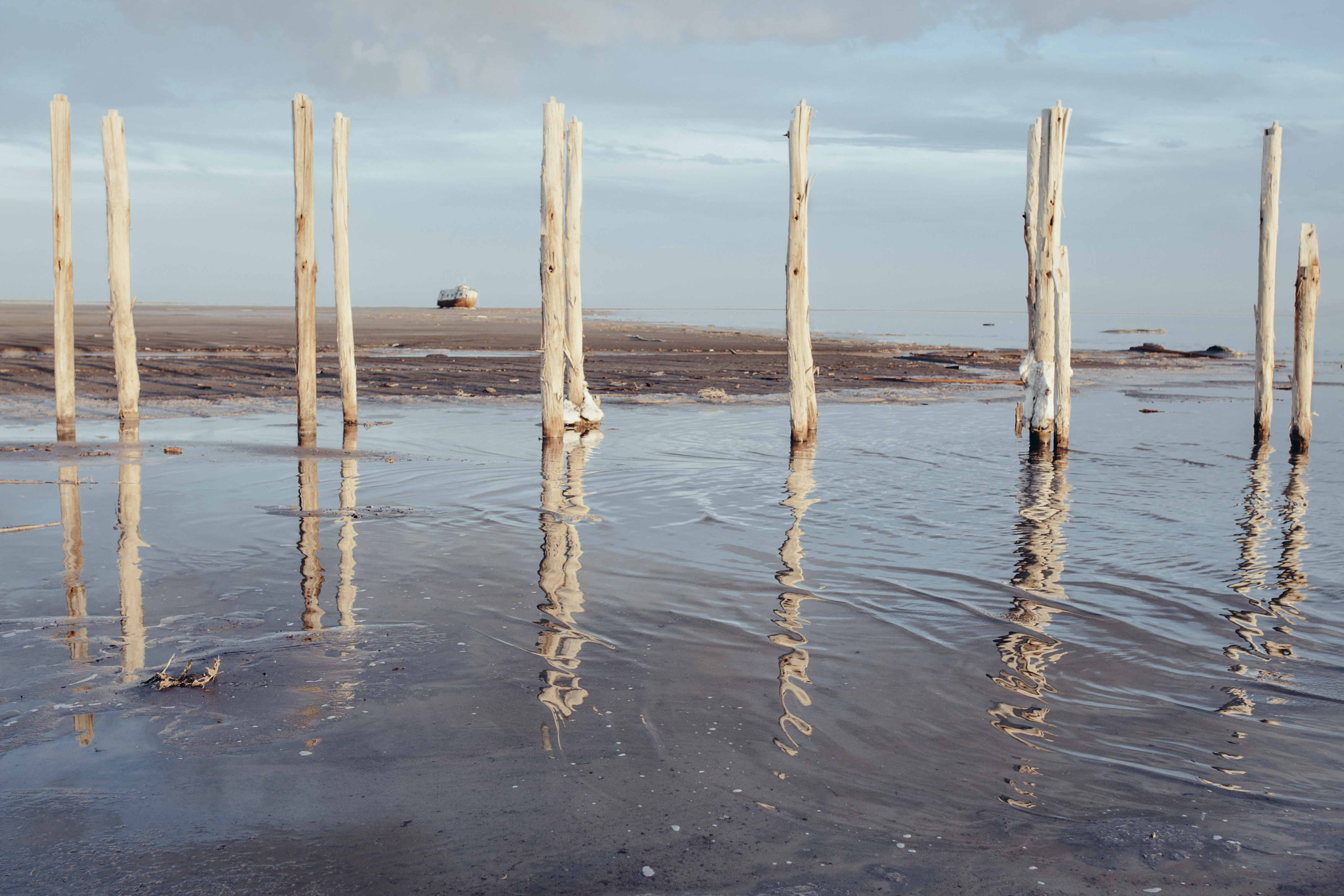
- Remnants of a dilapidated dock, Sharafkhaneh port

- Location within Iran
- Coordinates: 38°10′41″N 45°29′23″E
- Country: Iran
- Province: East Azerbaijan
- County: Shabestar
- District: Central

Population (2016)
  - Total: 4,244
- Time zone: UTC+3:30 (IRST)

Sharafkhaneh (Persian: شرفخانه) (Note: Also romanized as Sharafkhāneh; also known as Bandar-e Sharafkhāneh, Sharifkhane, Sharifkhaneh, and Sheraf-Khane) is a city in the Central District of Shabestar County, East Azerbaijan province, Iran. The city is on Lake Urmia.

== Demographics ==
=== Population ===
At the time of the 2006 National Census, the city's population was 3,872 in 1,132 households. The census in 2011 counted 3,585 people in 1,133 households. The 2016 census measured the population of the city as 4,244 people in 1,446 households.
