= Ali Beygluy-e Sofla =

Ali Beygluy-e Sofla علي بيگلوي سفلي
- Village
- Location within Iran
- Coordinates: 36°54′04″N 46°57′52″E
- Country: Iran
- Province: East Azerbaijan
- County: Charuymaq
- Bakhsh: Central
- Rural District: Charuymaq-e Jonubegharbi

Population (2006)
  - Total: 91
- Time zone: UTC+3:30 (IRST)
  - Summer (DST): UTC+4:30 (IRDT)

Ali Beygluy-e Sofla (Persian: علي بيگلوي سفلي, also Romanized as ‘Alī Beyglūy-e Soflá; also known as ‘Alī Beyglū-ye Soflá and ‘Alībeyglū-ye Soflá) is a village in Charuymaq-e Jonubegharbi Rural District, in the Central District of Charuymaq County, East Azerbaijan Province, Iran. At the 2006 census, its population was 91, in 20 families.
