= Guney-ye Sharqi Rural District =

Rural district in East Azerbaijan province, Iran

Guney-ye Sharqi Rural District Persian: دهستان گوني شرقي
- Rural District
- Location within Iran
- Coordinates: 38°09′N 45°43′E
- Country: Iran
- Province: East Azerbaijan
- County: Shabestar
- District: Central

Population (2016)
  - Total: 5,579
- Time zone: UTC+3:30 (IRST)

Guney-ye Sharqi Rural District (Persian: دهستان گوني شرقي) (Note: Turkish: Doğu Güney Rural District) is in the Central District of Shabestar County, East Azerbaijan province, Iran.

== Demographics ==
=== Population ===
At the time of the 2006 National Census, the rural district's population was 5,276 in 1,596 households. There were 6,357 inhabitants in 1,947 households at the following census of 2011. The 2016 census measured the population of the rural district as 5,579 in 1,936 households. The most populous of its six villages was Dizaj Khalil, with 3,137 people.

=== Other villages in the rural district ===
- Benis
- Nowjeh Deh
- Shanejan
