= KAIF Trophy =

Top African football / soccer tournament

KAIF Cup
- Organiser(s): Austrian Football Association
- Founded: 2021
- Region: Europe
- Teams: 8
- Current champions: (Germany) Turbine Potsdam
- Most championships: (Germany) 1.FFC Turbine Potsdam (1 title)
- 2021 KAIF Trophy

The KAIF Trophy is annual international women's association football club competition. The tournament organised by the Austrian Football Association, and will involve the top women's club teams of association members nations. The tournament severe as a preparation for the UEFA Women's Champions League

== Results ==
| Season | Champion | Runner up | Ref. |
|---|---|---|---|
| 2021 | (Germany) FFC Turbine Potsdam | (Spain) Real Madrid | |

== Top goalscorers ==
| Season | Player | Clubs | Goals | Ref. |
|---|---|---|---|---|
| 2021 | (Germany) Dina Orschmann (Spain) Rocío Gálvez (Germany) Selina Cerci (Germany) Merle Barth | Turbine Potsdam; Real Madrid; Turbine Potsdam; Turbine Potsdam | 2 | |
