= Sis, Iran =

City in East Azerbaijan province, Iran

Sis Persian: سيس
- City
- Location within Iran
- Coordinates: 38°11′59″N 45°48′46″E
- Country: Iran
- Province: East Azerbaijan
- County: Shabestar
- District: Central
- Established as a city: 1993

Population (2016)
  - Total: 6,106
- Time zone: UTC+3:30 (IRST)

Sis (Persian: سيس) (Note: Also romanized as Sīs; also known as Siz) is a city in the Central District of Shabestar County, East Azerbaijan province, Iran. The village of Sis was converted to a city in 1993.

== Demographics ==
=== Population ===
At the time of the 2006 National Census, the city's population was 5,127 in 1,391 households. The following census in 2011 counted 5,502 people in 1,586 households. The 2016 census measured the population of the city as 6,106 people in 1,928 households.
