= Ali Beyglu, Meyaneh =

Ali Beyglu علي بيگلو
- Village
- Location within Iran
- Coordinates: 37°41′28″N 47°49′45″E
- Country: Iran
- Province: East Azerbaijan
- County: Meyaneh
- Bakhsh: Kandovan
- Rural District: Kandovan

Population (2006)
  - Total: 21
- Time zone: UTC+3:30 (IRST)
  - Summer (DST): UTC+4:30 (IRDT)

Ali Beyglu (Persian: علي بيگلو, also Romanized as ‘Alī Beyglū) is a village in Kandovan Rural District, Kandovan District, Meyaneh County, East Azerbaijan Province, Iran. At the 2006 census, its population was 21, in 7 families.
