= Vayqan =

City in East Azerbaijan province, Iran

Vayqan Persian: وايقان
- City
- Location within Iran
- Coordinates: 38°07′45″N 45°42′45″E
- Country: Iran
- Province: East Azerbaijan
- County: Shabestar
- District: Central
- Established as a city: 1993

Population (2016)
  - Total: 4,678
- Time zone: UTC+3:30 (IRST)

Vayqan (Persian: وايقان) (Note: Also romanized as Vayeqān and Vāyqān; also known as Vaighan, Vayagan, and Vāygān) is a city in the Central District of Shabestar County, East Azerbaijan province, Iran. The village of Vayqan was converted to a city in 1993.

== Demographics ==
=== Population ===
At the time of the 2006 National Census, the city's population was 4,091 in 1,095 households. The following census in 2011 counted 4,298 people in 1,273 households. The 2016 census measured the population of the city as 4,678 people in 1,501 households.
