= Khamaneh =

City in East Azerbaijan province, Iran

Khamaneh Persian: خامنه
- City
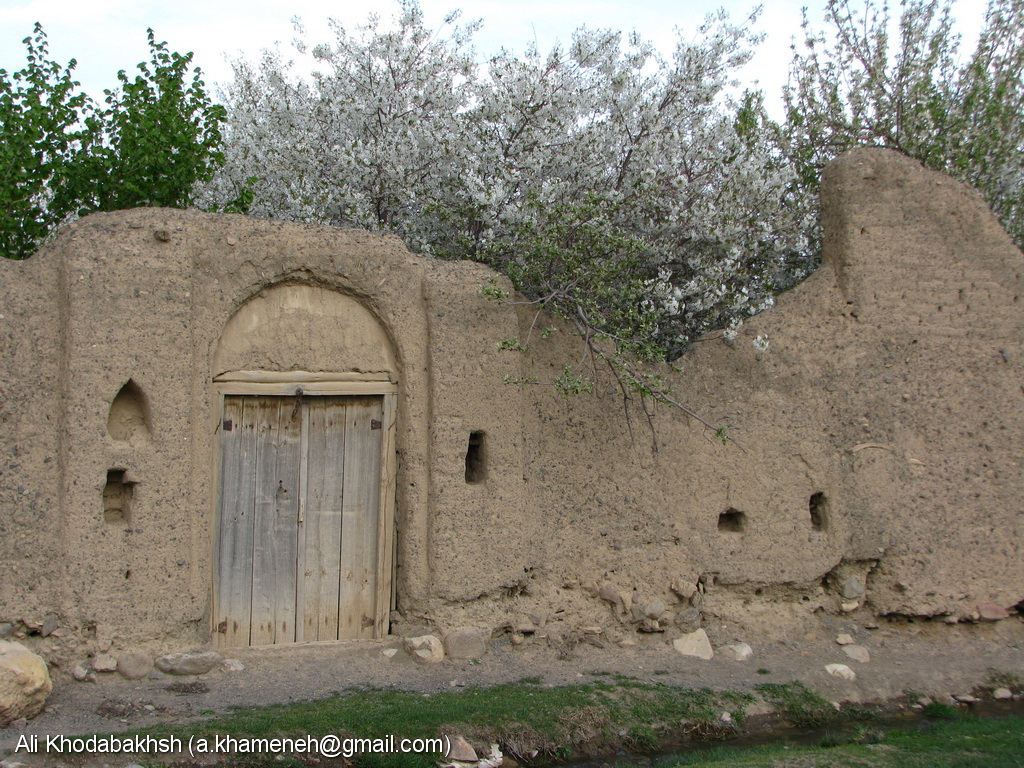
- House in Khamaneh

- Location within Iran
- Coordinates: 38°11′34″N 45°37′51″E
- Country: Iran
- Province: East Azerbaijan
- County: Shabestar
- District: Central

Population (2016)
  - Total: 3,056
- Time zone: UTC+3:30 (IRST)

Khamaneh (Persian: خامنه) (Note: Also romanized as Khamaneh, Khāmeneh, and Khāmneh; also known as Khāminah, Khumla, and Khumna) is a city in the Central District of Shabestar County, East Azerbaijan province, Iran. The city is 72 kilometres (45 mi) from Tabriz.

== History ==
The main industry of Khameneh used to be fabric and wool. Marefat (Nesar) school, the first school in Shabestar area, was built in Khameneh in 1899.

== Demographics ==
=== Population ===
At the time of the 2006 National Census, the city's population was 2,750 in 827 households. The following census in 2011 counted 2,541 people in 812 households. The 2016 census measured the population of the city as 3,056 people in 1,009 households.

== Attractions ==
- Masjid MirPanj (MirPanj Mosque)
- Qanatin (Aqueducts) of Khameneh
- Bazar (Market) of Khameneh
- Historical bathroom of Khameneh
- Qareh Kahriz tourism area

== Notable people ==
- Khamenei family
- Mohammad Khiabani
- Mir-Hossein Mousavi
- Mirza Fatali Akhundzadeh, whose father was born in Khameneh
