= Alishah, Kurdistan =

Alishah عليشاه
- Village
- Location within Iran
- Coordinates: 36°12′11″N 47°28′46″E
- Country: Iran
- Province: Kurdistan
- County: Bijar
- Bakhsh: Central
- Rural District: Siyah Mansur

Population (2006)
  - Total: 86
- Time zone: UTC+3:30 (IRST)
  - Summer (DST): UTC+4:30 (IRDT)

Alishah (Persian: عليشاه, also Romanized as ‘Alīshāh) is a village in Siyah Mansur Rural District, in the Central District of Bijar County, Kurdistan Province, Iran. At the 2006 census, its population was 86, in 18 families. The village is populated by Azerbaijanis.
