= Shabestar =

City in East Azerbaijan province, Iran

Shabestar شبستر
- City
- Location within Iran
- Coordinates: 38°10′48″N 45°42′11″E
- Country: Iran
- Province: East Azerbaijan
- County: Shabestar
- District: Central

Government
  - Mayor: Seyed Bagher Mousavian
- Elevation: 1,400 m (4,600 ft)

Population (2016)
  - Total: 22,181
- Time zone: UTC+3:30 (IRST)

Shabestar (Persian: شبستر) (Note: Also known as Chabiastar, Shabiastar, and Shabistar) is a city in the Central District of Shabestar County, East Azerbaijan province, Iran, serving as capital of both the county and the district.

Shabestar, with an altitude of 1,400 meters, is located in the southern foothills of Mishudagh, 575 km northwest of Tehran and 54 km northwest of Tabriz, on the road from Tabriz to Khuy, Selmas, Urumiye, Ushnawiye and Piranshahr. The railway line from Tabriz to Türkiye passes by this city.

== Demographics ==
=== Ethnicity ===
The population is Azerbaijanis.

=== Population ===
At the time of the 2006 National Census, the city's population was 13,857 in 3,989 households. The following census in 2011 counted 15,663 people in 4,824 households. The 2016 census measured the population of the city as 22,181 people in 7,004 households.

Shabestar is located in proximity to Tabriz, the provincial capital, on the main Iranian-International railway line which connects Tehran and Tabriz to Turkey and Europe. During the Safavid period. Shabestar's economy and development has received a major boost due to the 'Azad' university built there.

== Historical monuments ==
- Mosque of Tasouj
- Mojoumbar Church
- Sohrol Church
- Mosque Sheykh Esmayil Shabestari
- Great Jameh Mosque
- Khalil Shrine and Rudqat Bridge are the historic and ancient monuments of Shabestar.
