= Ali-Shah Jivraj =

Ugandan businessman and entrepreneur (born 1987)

- Born: 1987 (age 38–39); Uganda
- Occupations: Businessman, entrepreneur
- Years active: 2006 - present

Ali-Shah Jivraj (born in 1987) is a Ugandan businessman and entrepreneur. He is the former founder of an electronics firm, a Ugandan company that assembles products such as television sets, DVD players, radios, and speakers, in 2010 the company was ranked seventh in KPMG's annual ranking of the top 100 mid-sized companies in Uganda.

== Background and education ==
He was born in 1987 into a wealthy Ugandan family of Indian descent. He first considered becoming an entrepreneur in 2006 at age 19, when he was still attending high school.

== Career ==
In 2006, an acquaintance who was moving to Uganda in search of employment. The visitor was an experienced television repairman who impressed Jivraj and his mother by repairing the family television set. The still teenage-aged Jivraj borrowed money from family members, hired the visitor, and started assembling television sets with the help of parts imported from Malaysia and China. He has also set up a television assembly factory in neighboring Tanzania

More recently, Jivraj has been manufacturing dry-cell batteries. His factory is located in China and the products are marketed in Uganda and neighboring countries. He has branched out into real estate, with loans from Ugandan banks, by building luxury apartment complexes.

== See also ==
- List of banks in Uganda
- Banking in Uganda
