= Kuzeh Kanan =

City in East Azerbaijan province, Iran

KouzehKanan Persian: کوزه‌کَنان
- City
- kouzehkanan
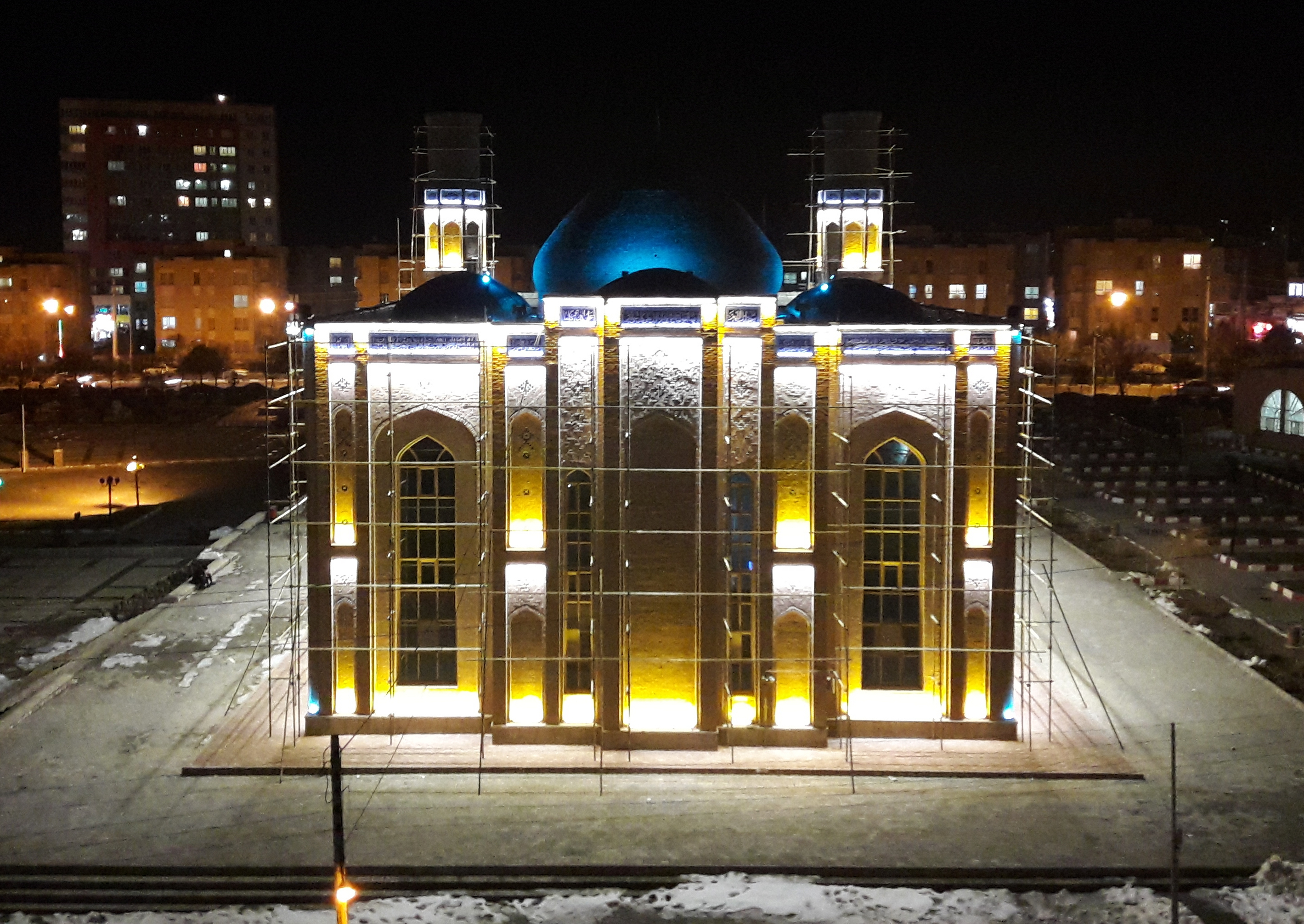
- The Congregational Mosque of Sahand

- Location within Iran
- Coordinates: 38°11′22″N 45°34′42″E
- Country: Iran
- Province: East Azerbaijan
- County: Shabestar
- District: Central
- Established as a city: 2003

Population (2016)
  - Total: 4,730
- Time zone: UTC+3:30 (IRST)

KouzehKanan (Persian: کوزه‌کَنان) (Note: Also romanized as KoozehKanan, Kouzehkanan, and KūzehKanān;) is a city in the Central District of Shabestar County, East Azerbaijan province, Iran. The village of KouzehKanan was converted to a city in 2003.

== Demographics ==
=== Population ===
At the time of the 2006 National Census, the city's population was 3,524 in 892 households. The following census in 2011 counted 3,274 people in 917 households. The 2016 census measured the population of the city as 4,730 people in 1,536 households.
