= Ali Shah, East Azerbaijan =

City in East Azerbaijan province, Iran

Ali Shah Persian: عليشاه
- City
- Location within Iran
- Coordinates: 38°08′31″N 45°50′05″E
- Country: Iran
- Province: East Azerbaijan
- County: Shabestar
- District: Central
- Established as a city: 2019

Population (2016)
  - Total: 3,010
- Time zone: UTC+3:30 (IRST)

Ali Shah (Persian: عليشاه) (Note: Also romanized as ‘Alī Shāh and ‘Alīshāh; also known as Ali-Shakh) is a city in the Central District of Shabestar County, East Azerbaijan province, Iran.

== Demographics ==
=== Population ===
At the time of the 2006 National Census, Ali Shah's population was 2,649 in 706 households, when it was a village in Sis Rural District. The following census in 2011 counted 3,751 people in 1,077 households. The 2016 census measured the population of the village as 3,010 people in 1,002 households. It was the most populous village in its rural district.

Ali Shah was converted to a city in 2019.
