= Ali Shah Bukhari =

Kashmiri philosopher (1914-1979)

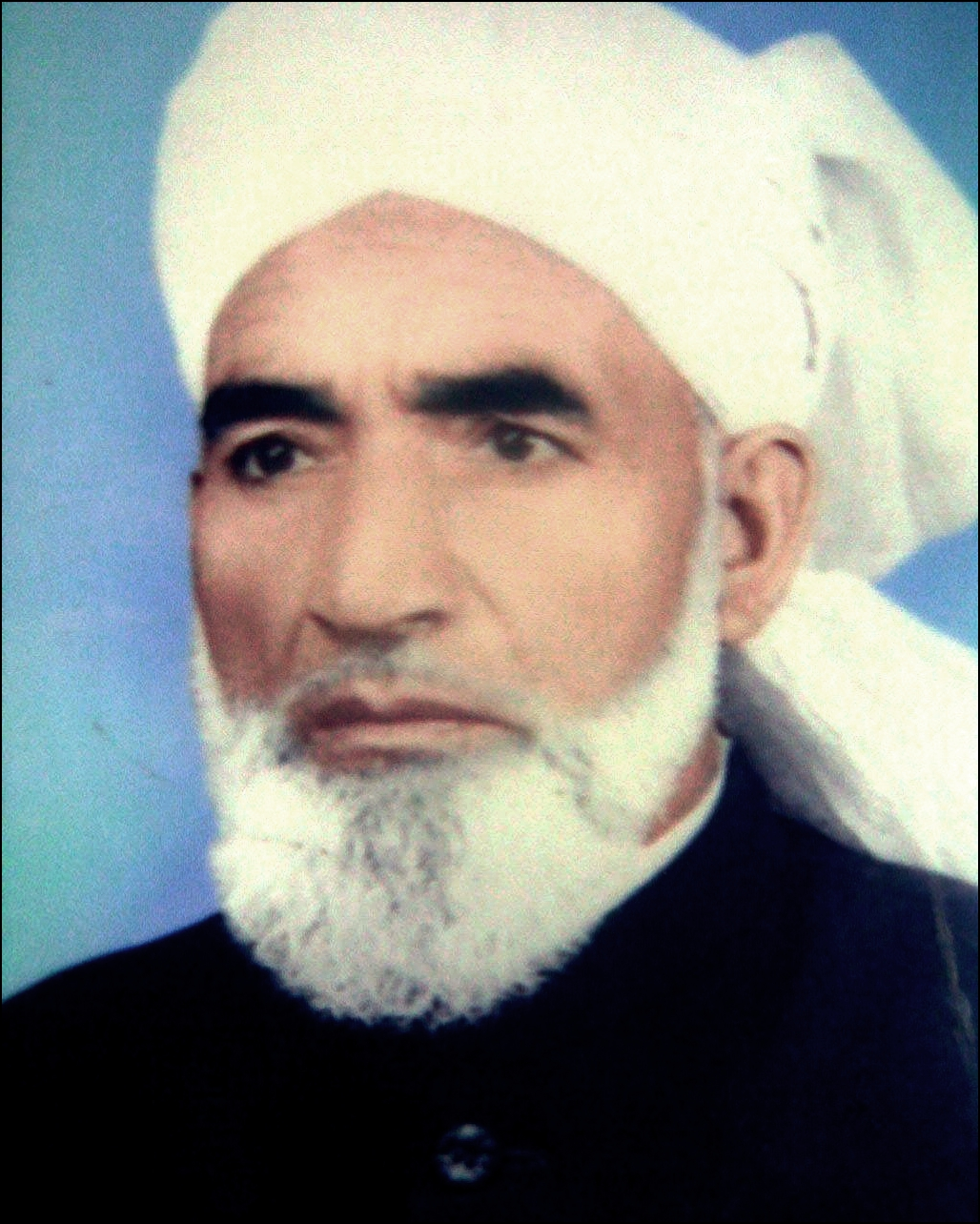
- سرسید ثانی سید علی شاہ بُخاری
- Born: 30 November 1914; Sodipora, Beerwah
- Died: 30 March 1979 (aged 64); Beerwah
- Resting place: Beerwah
- Other name: Sir Syed Sani
- Children: Mirwaiz Syed Abdul Lateef Bukhari Syed Abdul Raoouf Bukhari

Education
- Education: Mazhar Ul Haq High School

Philosophical work
- Era: 20th century, Modern era
- Region: Kashmir
- School: Islamic
- Institutions: Mazhar Ul Haq High School, Beerwah, Anjuman Mazhar Ul Haq
- Main interests: Pragmatism, education, Philanthropy, Islam

Sir Syed Sani Syed Ali Shah Bukhari (Kashmiri: سر سید سانی سید علی شاہ بُخاری) (born 30 November 1914 – 30 March 1979) commonly known as Ali Shah, Sir Syed Sani, Molvi Saeeb, Sir Syed Kashmir, Chirag-i-Beerwah, or Musleh-Millat, was a 20th-century Kashmiri Muslim pragmatist, Islamic modernist, philosopher, Islamic jurist, social activist and educator in the tehsil Beerwah of the Budgam district of Jammu and Kashmir. He was the khateeb, Imam and Mirwaiz of the Grand Jamia Masjid Beerwah.

== Early life and education ==
Syed Ali Shah Bukhari was born on 30 November 1914, the second born son of the Syed family in Sodipora, Beerwah. His ancestor Syed Ali Allauddin (Khansahib) Rizvi-Al Bukhari are said to have come from Bukhara in Uzbekistan. His father, Syed Gulam Mohammed Bukhari, a religious scholar in the Budgam district, was a close friend of Mirwaiz Mohamed Yusuf Shah. Bukhari studied Arabic, Persian, and Islamic literature with his father. Later, he pursued his education in Amritsar with his maternal uncle. Like many of the scholars of his time, Bukhari lived a very simple life, growing up poor but religious.

== Social activism ==
Syed Ali Shah Bukhari founded a missionary primary school Mazhar Ul Haq High School in 1934 to improve children's education, particularly for poor families. Founded thirteen years before the independence of India, the school worked as a madrassa and primary school in which both academic Arabic and Persian were taught. Students came from tehsil Beerwah, the district of Budgam, the district of Srinagar and the district of Baramulla. Syed Ali also founded "Anjuman Mazhar ul Haq" in 1951, which functions as a semi-governing body in Beerwah and manages the Jamia Masjid Beerwah and Mazhar ul Haq High School Beerwah. Apart from playing a role in the promotion of literacy, Bukhari was a religious scholar and social activist guiding people in their day-to-day lives. He laid down the foundation stone of Jamia Masjid Beerwah in 1928 along with his elder brother Syed Saeed Bukhari and gave Friday sermons in the Masjid until his death.

== Political activism ==
Syed Ali Shah Bukhari's association with politics was a means of helping his area improve its socio-economic situation. His close association with Prime Ministers Bakshi Ghulam Mohammad and Sheikh Mohammad Abdullah entailed the establishment of tehsil (administrative division) headquarters at Beerwah as well as associated offices. He ran twice for a seat in the Jammu and Kashmir Legislative Assembly. In 1957, he ran in the election for the Beerwah constituency on behalf of the National Conference and in 1977, he ran for the Budgam constituency on behalf of the Janata Party. He was arrested on political grounds in 1965, released on parole, and re-arrested and eventually released in 1969.

== Title of Sir Syed Sani ==
He was awarded the title of Sir Syed Sani (second Sir Syed ) by the Prime Minister of Jammu and Kashmir Sheikh Mohamad Abdullah for his works in the field of education and social work. Fazil Kashmiri, a poet, wrote a piece on Mawlana Ali Bukhari which is called "Chirag-e-Beerwah".

== Death ==
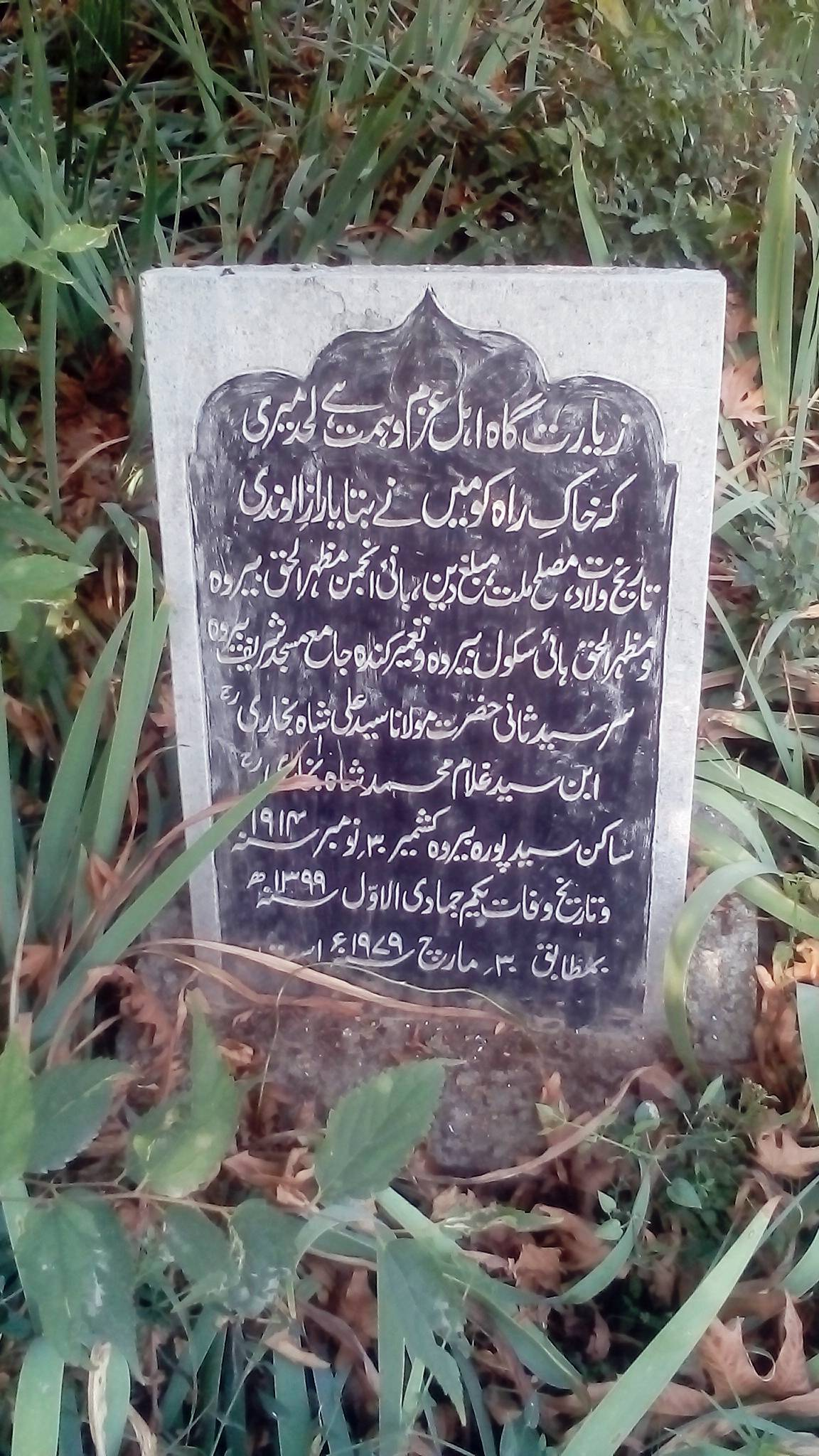
Sir Syed Sani Hazrat Mawlana Syed Ali Shah Bukhari's Grave

Mawlana Syed Ali Shah Bukhari died on 30 March 1979 (1399 AH), at the age of sixty-four. He was buried in the courtyard of Jamia Masjid Beerwah. His funeral prayers were led by Mirwaiz Kashmir Maulana Mohammad Farooq and it was attended by thousands of people. He commanded respect from Sikhs, Hindus and Muslims for his views and dedication to the cause of education.
