= Donawitz Stadium =

Football stadium in Austria

Coordinates: 47.3768°N 15.0788°E

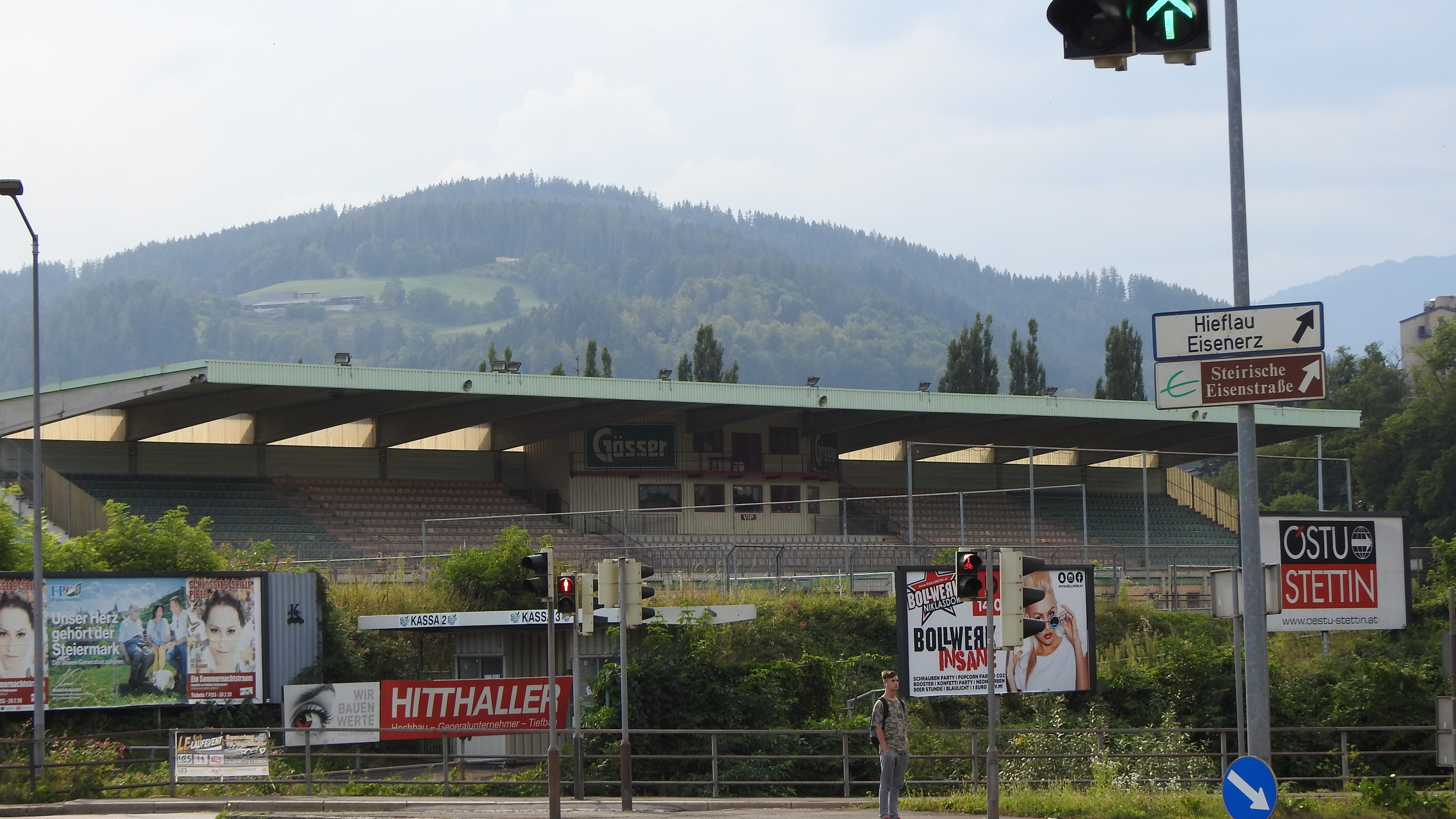
The Donawitz Stadium in Leoben

Donawitz Stadium is a multi-use stadium in Leoben, Austria. It is used mostly for football matches and is the home ground of DSV Leoben. The stadium holds 8,450 people and was built in 2000.
