= Merle Barth =

German footballer (born 1994)

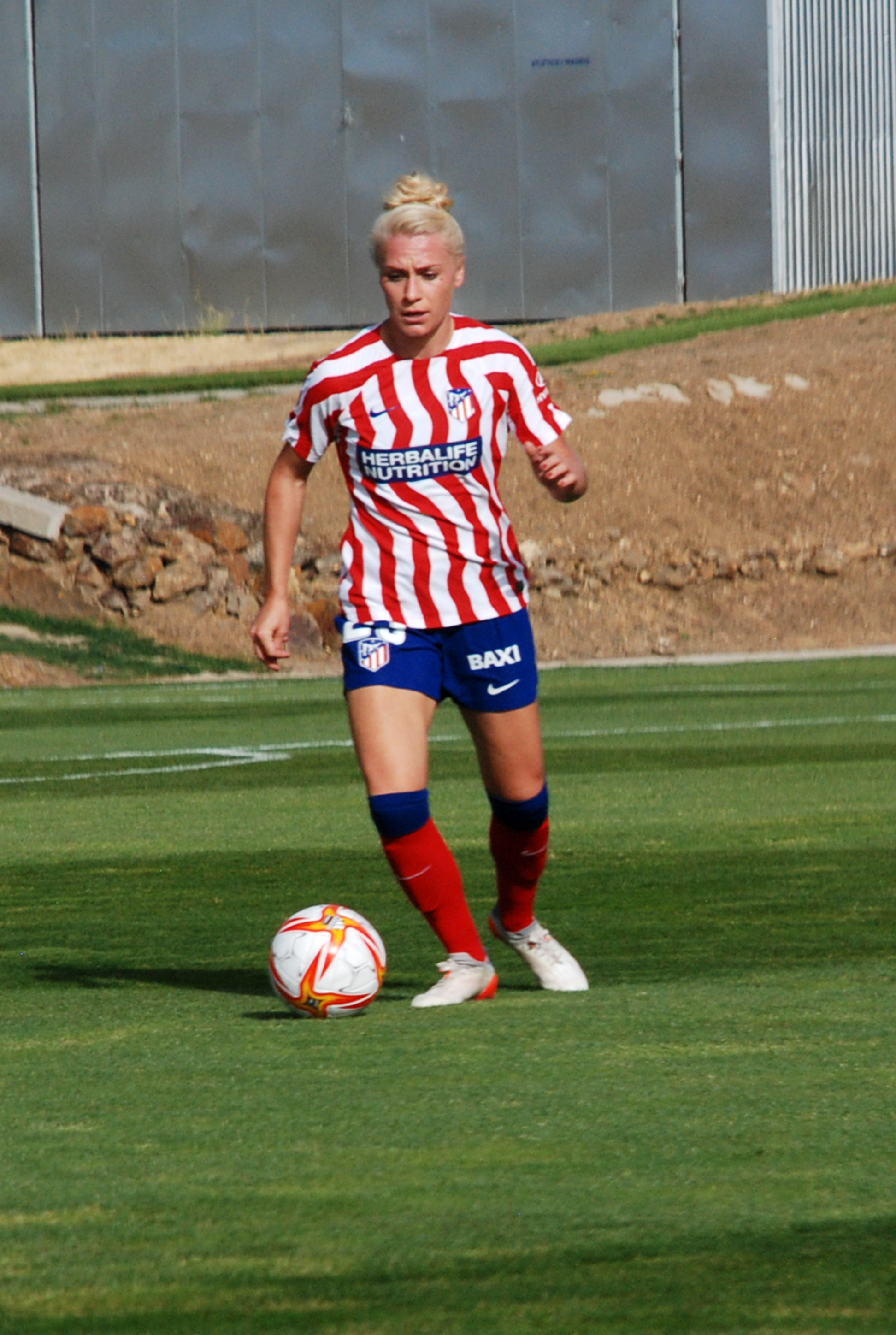
- Barth with Atlético Madrid in 2022

Personal information
- Date of birth: 21 April 1994 (age 32)
- Height: 1.68 m (5 ft 6 in)
- Positions: Defender; midfielder

Team information
- Current team: Deportivo de La Coruña
- Number: 23

Youth career
- 2009–2011: Bayer Leverkusen

Senior career*
Years	Team	Apps	(Gls)
2010–2020	Bayer Leverkusen	137	(10)
2020–2022	Turbine Potsdam	41	(0)
2022–2025	Atlético Madrid	11	(0)
2025–	Deportivo de La Coruña	13	(0)
- * Club domestic league appearances and goals as of 22 December 2025

Merle Barth (born 21 April 1994) is a German professional footballer who plays as a defender or midfielder for Liga F club Deportivo de La Coruña.
