= Central District (Shabestar County) =

District in East Azerbaijan province, Iran

Central District (Shabestar County) Persian: بخش مرکزی شهرستان شبستر
- District
- Location within Iran
- Coordinates: 38°10′N 45°35′E
- Country: Iran
- Province: East Azerbaijan
- County: Shabestar
- Established: 1990
- Capital: Shabestar

Population (2016)
  - Total: 78,933
- Time zone: UTC+3:30 (IRST)

The Central District of Shabestar County (Persian: بخش مرکزی شهرستان شبستر) is in East Azerbaijan province, Iran. Its capital is the city of Shabestar.

== History ==
The villages of Ali Shah and Daryan were converted to cities in 2019.

== Demographics ==
=== Population ===
At the time of the 2006 National Census, the district's population was 64,312 in 17,772 households. The following census in 2011 counted 70,218 people in 20,952 households. The 2016 census measured the population of the district as 78,933 inhabitants in 25,441 households.

=== Administrative divisions ===
Central District (Shabestar County) Population
Administrative Divisions	2006	2011	2016
Guney-ye Markazi RD	7,189	9,065	10,136
Guney-ye Sharqi RD	5,276	6,357	5,579
Sis RD	9,829	10,899	9,734
Ali Shah (city) (Note: Became a city after the 2016 census)			
Daryan (city) (Note: Became a city after the 2016 census)			
Khamaneh (city)	2,750	2,541	3,056
Kuzeh Kanan (city)	3,524	3,274	4,730
Shabestar (city)	13,857	15,663	22,181
Sharafkhaneh (city)	3,872	3,585	4,244
Shendabad (city)	8,797	9,034	8,489
Sis (city)	5,127	5,502	6,106
Vayqan (city)	4,091	4,298	4,678
Total	64,312	70,218	78,933
RD = Rural District
