= Shabestar County =

County in East Azerbaijan province, Iran

Shabestar County Persian: شهرستان شبستر
- County
- Location of Shabestar County in East Azerbaijan province (center left, yellow)

- Location of East Azerbaijan province in Iran
- Coordinates: 38°14′N 45°43′E
- Country: Iran
- Province: East Azerbaijan
- Established: 1990
- Capital: Shabestar
- Districts: Central, Sufian, Tasuj

Population (2016)
  - Total: 135,421
- Time zone: UTC+3:30 (IRST)

Shabestar County (Persian: شهرستان شبستر) is in East Azerbaijan province, Iran. Its capital is the city of Shabestar.

== History ==
The villages of Ali Shah and Daryan were converted to cities in 2019. In 2024, the village of Nazarlu became a city.

== Demographics ==
=== Population ===
At the time of the 2006 National Census, the county's population was 121,787 in 33,255 households. The following census in 2011 counted 124,499 people in 37,358 households. The 2016 census measured the population of the county as 135,421 in 43,982 households.

=== Administrative divisions ===
Shabestar County's population history and administrative structure over three consecutive censuses are shown in the following table.

Shabestar County Population
Administrative Divisions	2006	2011	2016
Central District	64,312	70,218	78,933
Guney-ye Markazi RD	7,189	9,065	10,136
Guney-ye Sharqi RD	5,276	6,357	5,579
Sis RD	9,829	10,899	9,734
Ali Shah (city) (Note: Became a city after the 2016 census)			
Daryan (city) (Note: Became a city after the 2016 census)			
Khamaneh (city)	2,750	2,541	3,056
Kuzeh Kanan (city)	3,524	3,274	4,730
Shabestar (city)	13,857	15,663	22,181
Sharafkhaneh (city)	3,872	3,585	4,244
Shendabad (city)	8,797	9,034	8,489
Sis (city)	5,127	5,502	6,106
Vayqan (city)	4,091	4,298	4,678
Sufian District	38,767	36,235	37,646
Chelleh Khaneh RD	7,921	7,630	7,877
Mishu-e Jonubi RD	10,276	8,563	8,648
Rudqat RD	11,837	10,916	11,158
Nazarlu (city) (Note: Became a city after the 2016 census)			
Sufian (city)	8,733	9,126	9,963
Tasuj District (Note: Formerly Anzab District)	18,708	18,046	18,842
Chehregan RD	3,509	3,171	2,981
Guney-ye Gharbi RD	7,867	7,505	8,339
Tasuj (city)	7,332	7,370	7,522
Total	121,787	124,499	135,421
RD = Rural District

== Publications ==
International Journal of Forest, Soil and Erosion has been published as a peer-reviewed journal in Shabestar city since November 2011.

== See also ==
Media related to Shabestar County at Wikimedia Commons
