= East Azerbaijan province =

Province of Iran

East Azerbaijan Province استان آذربایجان شرقی (Persian)
- Province
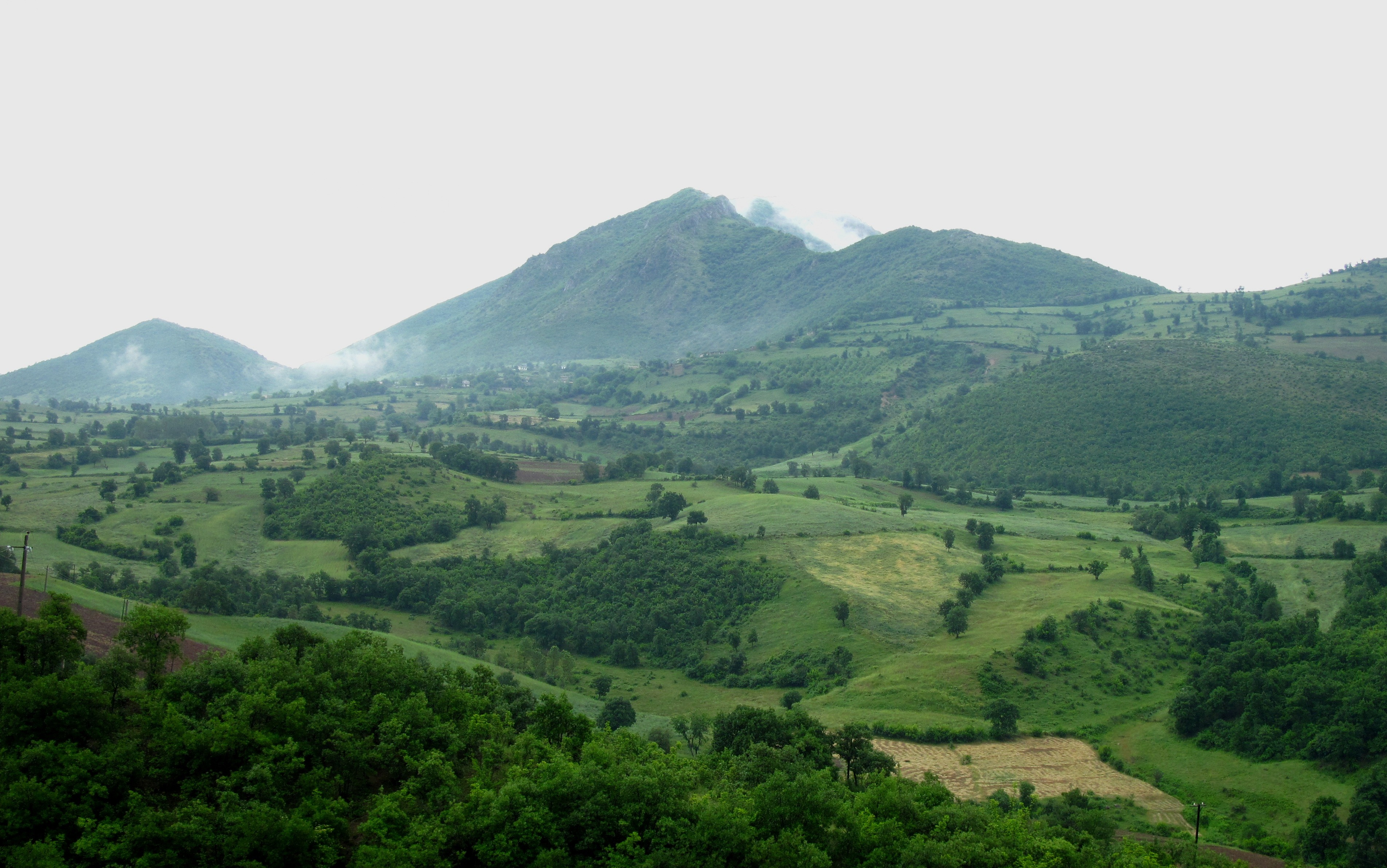
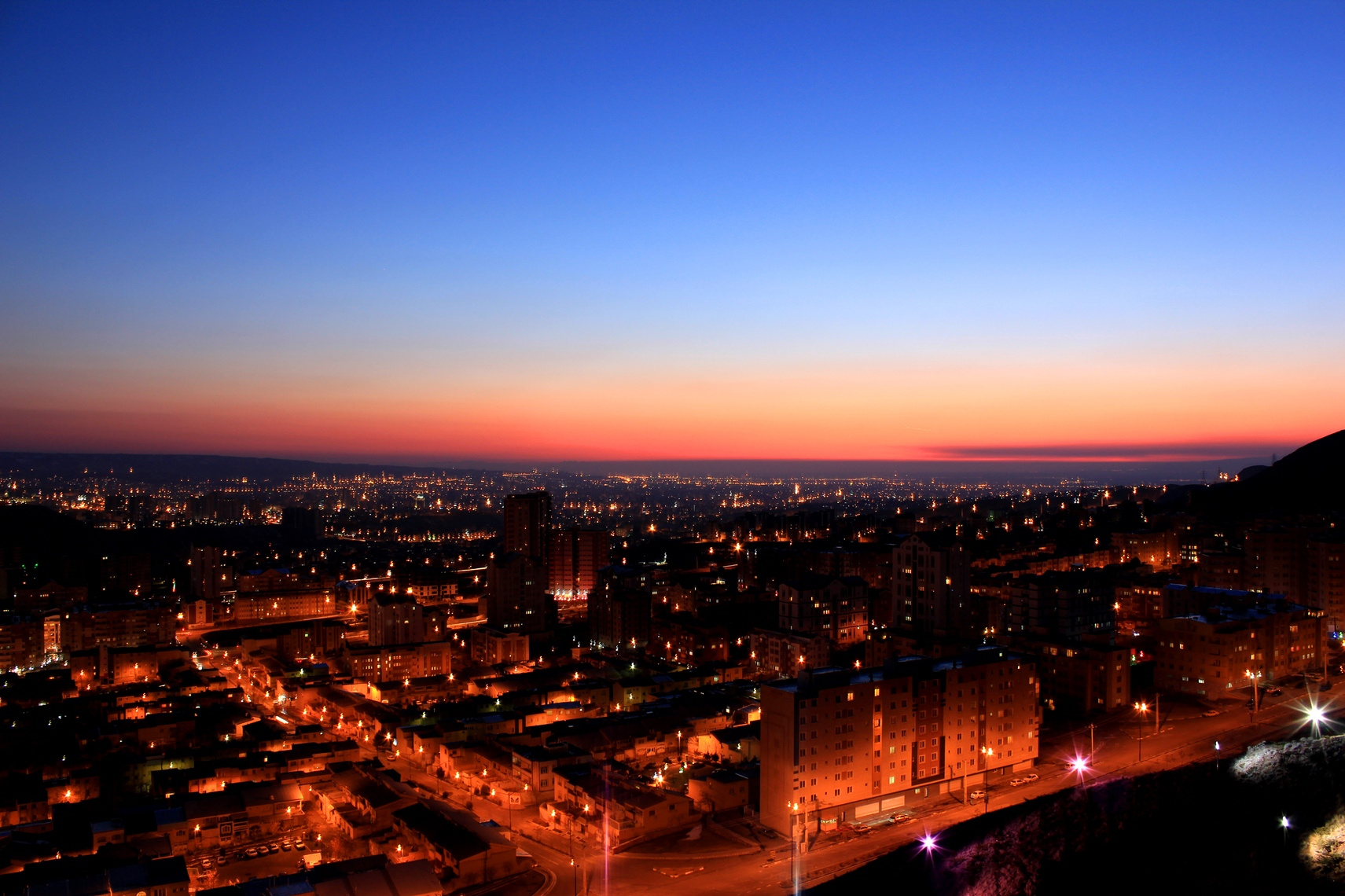
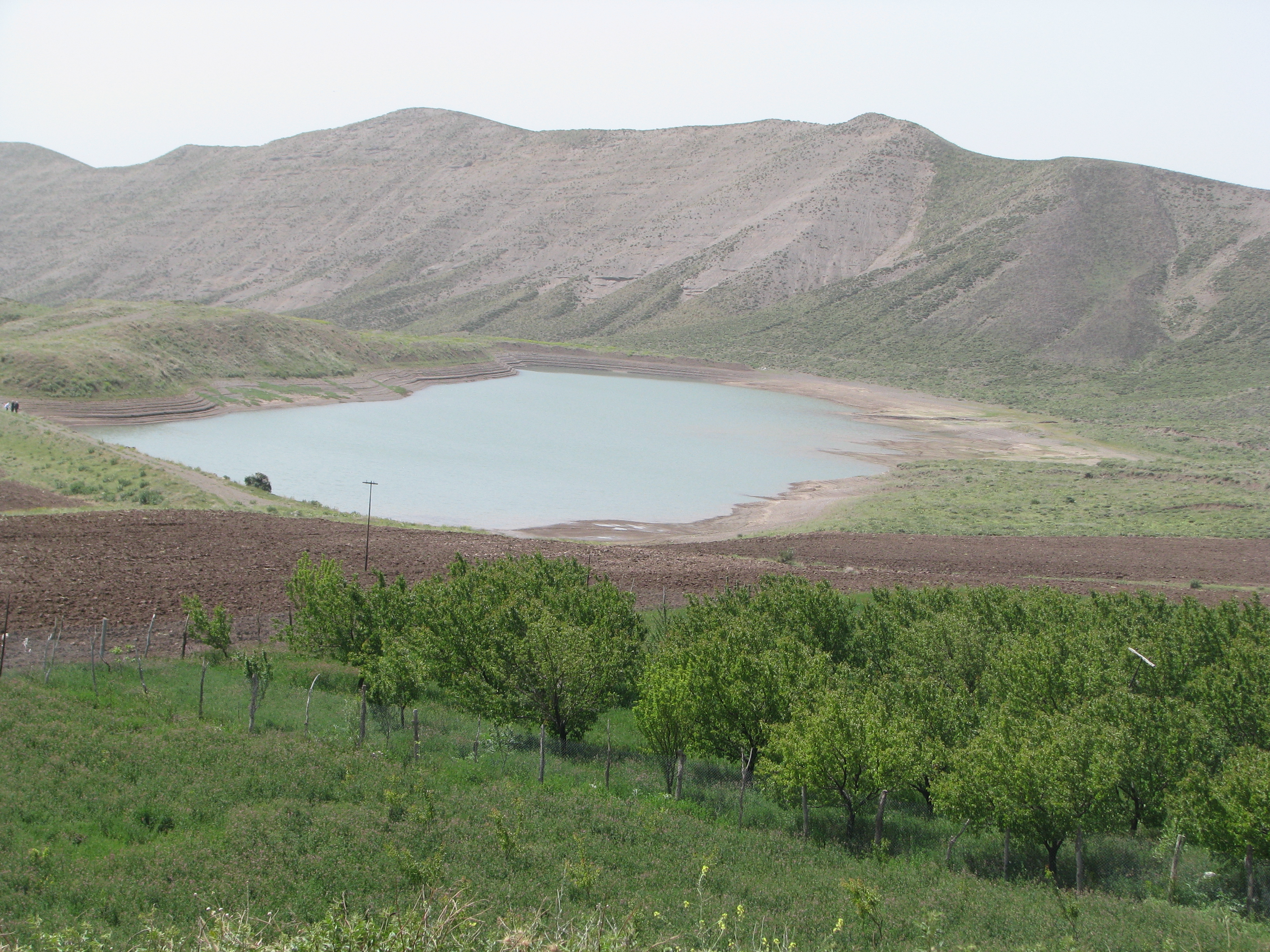
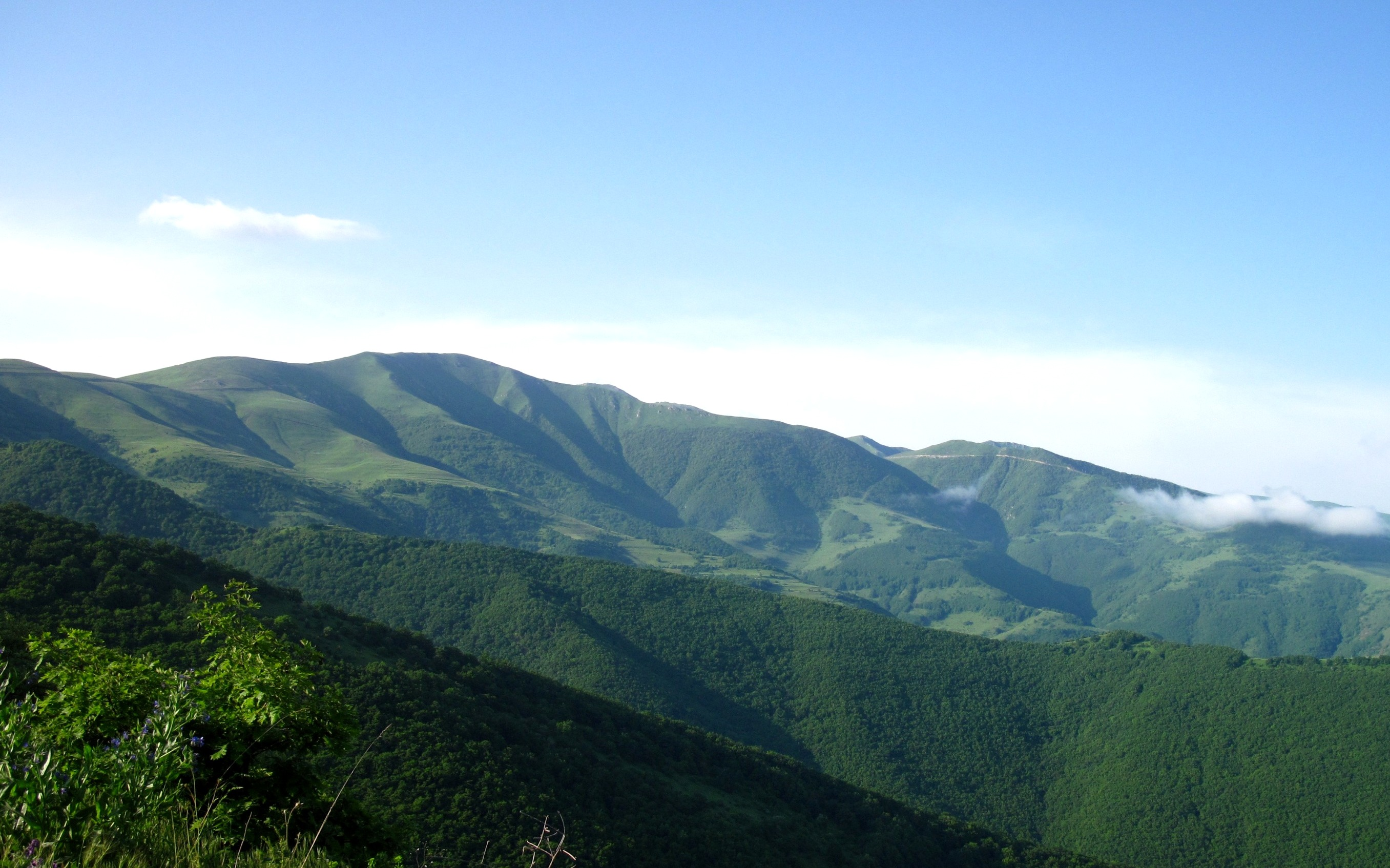
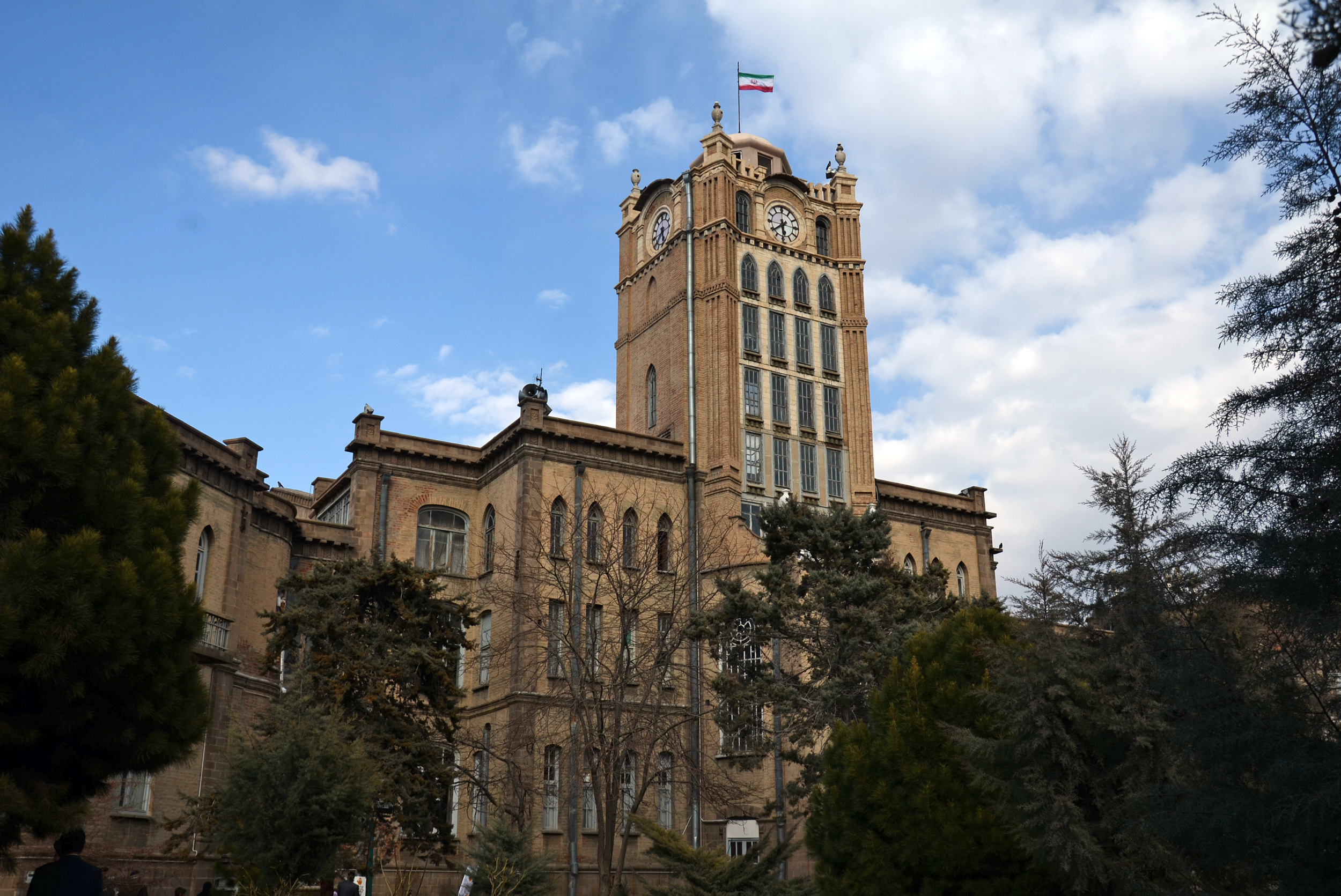
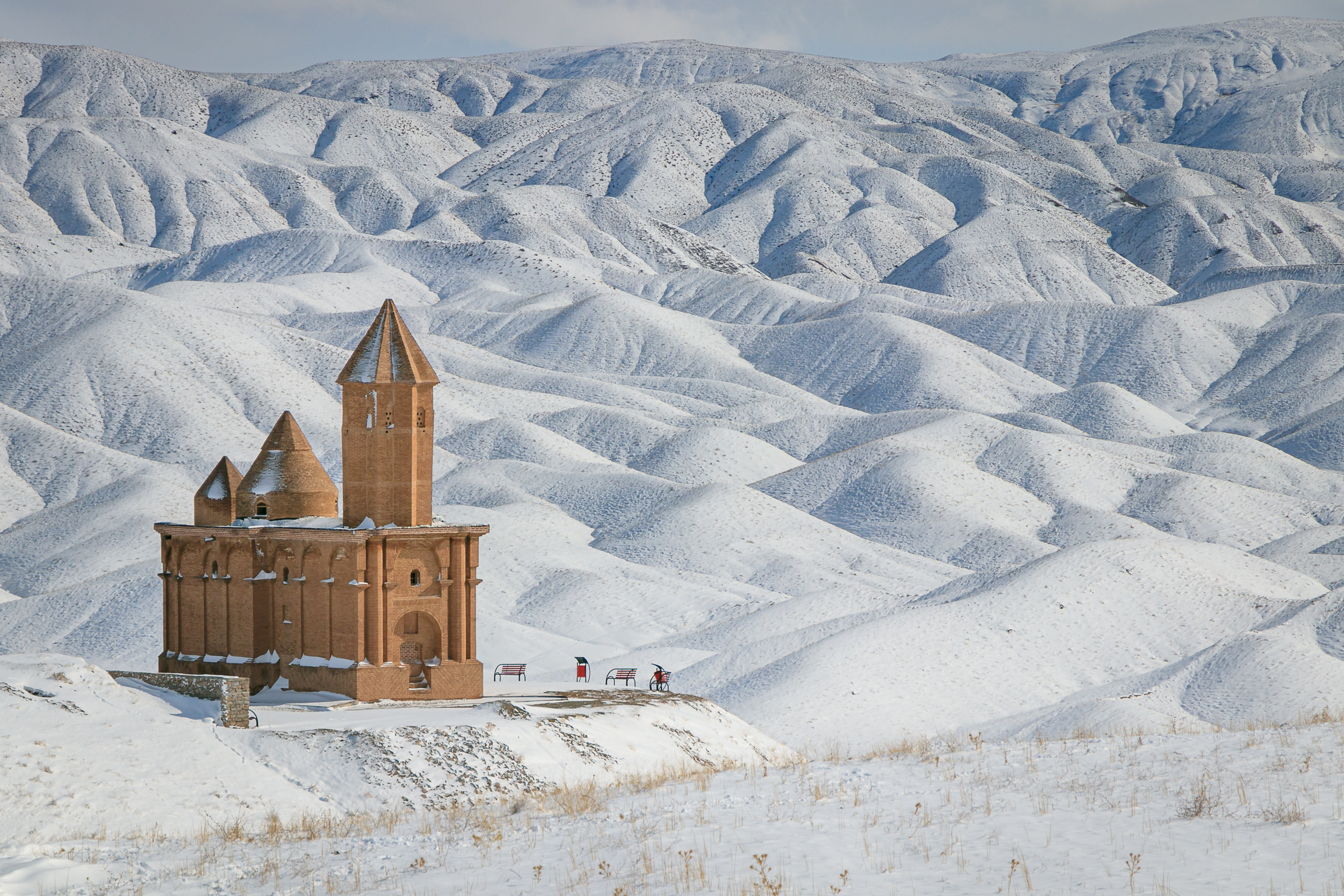
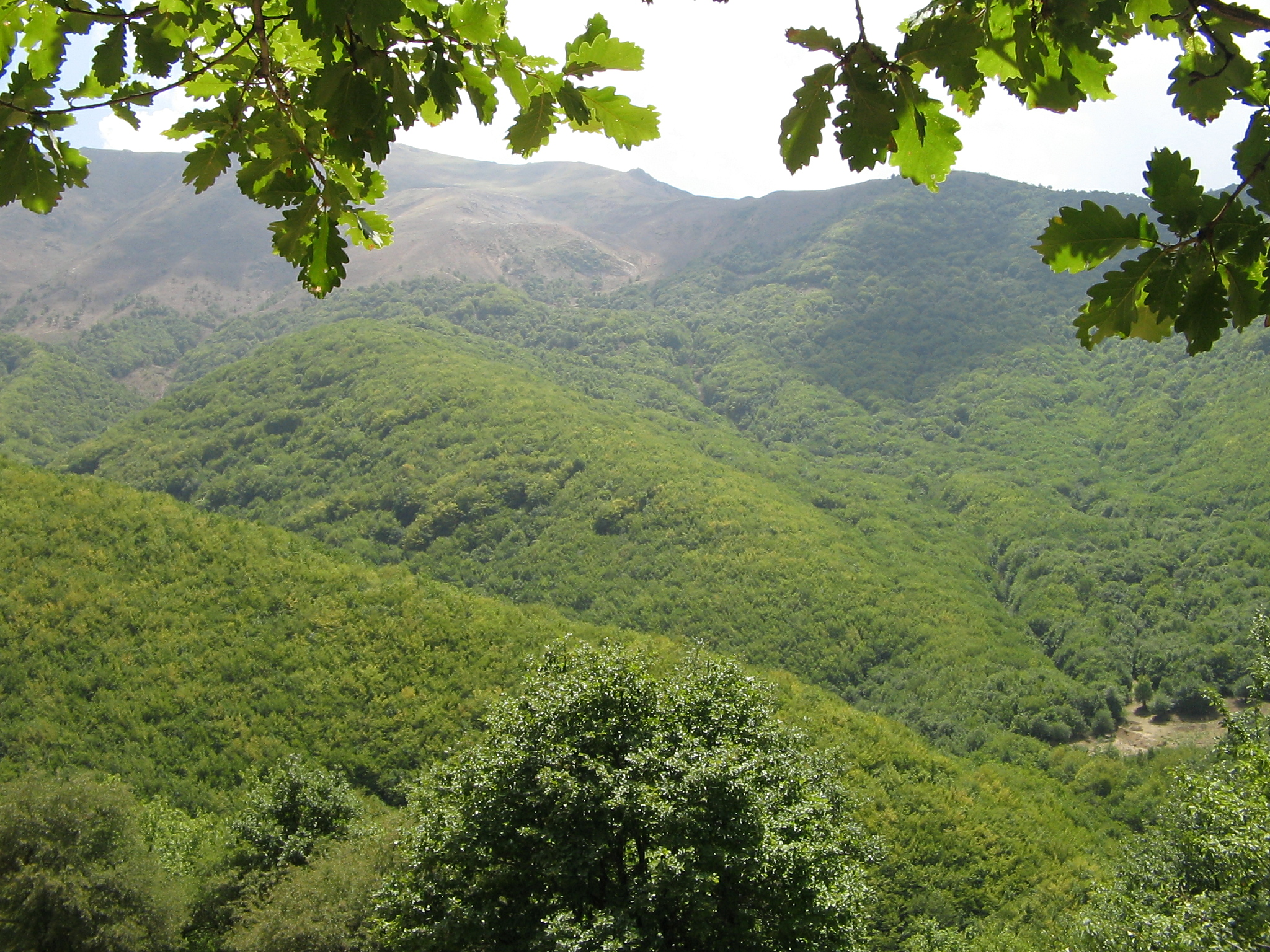

- Location of East Azerbaijan Province within Iran
- Coordinates: 38°05′N 46°46′E
- Country: Iran
- Region: Region 3
- Capital: Tabriz
- Counties: 23

Government
  - Governor-general: Bahram Sarmast
  - MPs of Parliament: East Azerbaijan Province parliamentary districts

Area
  - Total: 45,650 km^{2} (17,630 sq mi)

Population (2016 Census)
  - Total: 3,909,652
  - Density: 85.64/km^{2} (221.8/sq mi)
- Time zone: UTC+03:30 (IRST)
- ISO 3166 code: IR-03
- Main language(s): Persian (official); South Azerbaijani (local)
- HDI (2017): 0.785 high · 17th

East Azerbaijan Province (Persian: استان آذربایجان شرقی) (Note: Also romanized as Āzarbāijān-e Sharqi; Azerbaijani: شرقی آذربایجان اوستانی) is one of the 31 provinces of Iran. Its capital is the city of Tabriz.

The province borders Armenia, the Republic of Azerbaijan, Ardabil province, West Azerbaijan province, and Zanjan province. East Azerbaijan is in Region 3 of Iran, with its secretariat located in Tabriz.

== History ==
East Azerbaijan is one of the most archaic territories in Iran. During the reign of Alexander III of Macedon in Iran (331 BCE), a warrior known as Attorpat led a revolt in this area, then a territory of the Medes, and thereafter it was called Attorpatkan. Since then this vicinity has been known as Azarabadegan, Azarbadgan, and Azarbayjan.

Islamic researchers proclaim that the birth of the prophet Zoroaster was in this area, in the vicinity of Lake Orumieh (Chichesht), Konzak City. The area was subject to numerous political and economical upheavals, attracting the interest of foreigners; the Russians in particular have tried to exert a lasting influence in the region over the past 300 years, occupying the area on numerous occasions. The constitutionalist movement of Iran began here in the late 19th century.

Ethnic tensions in Azerbaijan can legally trace their origins back to the colonialist policies of Imperial Russia and later the Soviet Union. In a cable sent on 6 July 1945 by the Central Committee of the Communist Party of the Soviet Union, the local Soviet commander in Russian (northern) held Azerbaijan was instructed as such:

Begin preparatory work to form a national autonomous Azerbaijan district with broad powers within the Iranian state and simultaneously develop separatist movements in the provinces of Gilan, Mazandaran, Gorgan, and Khorasan".

In 1945, the Soviet Union helped set up the Azerbaijan People's Government in what is now East Azerbaijan.

== Demographics ==
=== Language and ethnicity ===
Most of the inhabitants are ethnic Azerbaijanis who speak a Turkic language related to Turkish.

In Qarajadaḡ (today Arasbaran), that is, the region between the Aras river and the Sabalan mountain range, there are six Shiʿite, Turkic-speaking tribes of Kurdish origin: Chalabianlu, Mohammadkhanlu, Hosaynkhanlu, Hajialilu, Hasanbeiglu and Qarachorlu.

=== Population ===
East Azerbaijan Province Historical Population
Year	Pop.	±%
2006	3,527,267	—
2011	3,724,620	+5.6%
2016	3,909,652	+5.0%

Religion in East Azerbaijan Province (2016)
1. Muslim (99.7%)
2. Christianity (0.01%)
3. Zoroastrian (0.11%)
4. Jewish (0.00%)
5. Other (0.01%)
6. Not Stated (0.19%)
Demographic Breakdown by Sex in East Azerbaijan Province (2016)
1. Male (50.9%)
2. Female (49.1%)

At the time of the 2006 National Census, the province's population was 3,527,267 in 911,241 households. The following census in 2011 counted 3,724,620 people in 1,085,455 households. The 2016 census measured the population of the province as 3,909,652 in 1,223,028 households.

=== Administrative divisions ===

At the 1986 census, there were twelve counties in East Azerbaijan province. By the 1996 census, two additional counties had been formed: Jolfa (from part of Marand), and Malekan (from part of Bonab). Between 1996 and 2002, five new counties were formed: Ajabshir, Azarshahr, Charuymaq, Osku, and Varzaqan. The table below illustrates further changes since the 2006 census.

The cities of Ahar and Mianeh of East Azerbaijan Province, along with Parsabad and Meshginshahr from Ardabil province, and Piranshahr and Salmas from West Azerbaijan, are six cities in Azerbaijan region that have joined the group of large cities with populations of over 100,000 people due to population changes after the 2016 census.

The population history and structural changes of East Azerbaijan Province's administrative divisions over three consecutive censuses are shown in the following table.

East Azerbaijan Province
Counties	2006	2011	2016
Ahar	147,781	150,111	154,530
Ajab Shir	65,741	66,746	70,852
Azarshahr	99,286	107,579	110,311
Bonab	125,209	129,795	134,892
Bostanabad	96,555	94,985	94,769
Charuymaq	33,921	32,745	31,071
Hashtrud	64,611	60,822	57,199
Heris	67,626	67,820	69,093
Hurand (Note: Separated from Ahar County after the 2016 census)	—	—	—
Jolfa	52,176	55,166	61,358
Kaleybar	87,259	48,837	46,125
Khoda Afarin (Note: Separated from Kaleybar County after the 2006 census)	—	34,977	32,995
Leylan (Note: Separated from Malekan County after the 2016 census)	—	—	—
Malekan	100,366	106,118	111,319
Maragheh	227,635	247,681	262,604
Marand	229,215	239,209	244,971
Mianeh	187,870	185,806	182,848
Osku	84,061	98,988	158,270
Sarab	132,094	131,934	125,341
Shabestar	121,787	124,499	135,421
Tabriz	1,557,241	1,695,094	1,773,033
Torkamanchay (Note: Separated from Mianeh County after the 2016 census)	—	—	—
Varzaqan	46,833	45,708	52,650
Total	3,527,267	3,724,620	3,909,652

=== Cities ===
According to the 2016 census, 2,809,424 people (over 71% of the population of East Azerbaijan Province) live in the following cities:

City	Population
Abish Ahmad	2,715
Achachi	3,647
Ahar	100,641
Ajab Shir	33,606
Aqkand	2,902
Azarshahr	44,887
Bakhshayesh	6,102
Basmenj	12,692
Benab-e Marand	4,311
Bonab	85,274
Bostanabad	21,734
Duzduzan	3,627
Gugan	11,742
Hadishahr	34,346
Hashtrud	20,572
Heris	10,515
Hurand	4,658
Ilkhchi	16,574
Javan Qaleh	700
Jolfa	8,810
Kaleybar	9,324
Khamaneh	3,056
Kharaju	1,824
Kharvana	3,353
Khomarlu	1,902
Khosrowshahr	21,972
Khvajeh	4,011
Kolvanaq	7,465
Koshksaray	8,060
Kuzeh Kanan	4,730
Leylan	6,356
Malekan	27,431
Mamqan	11,892
Maragheh	175,255
Marand	130,825
Mehraban	5,772
Mianeh	98,973
Mobarak Shahr	4,456
Nazarkahrizi	1,215
Osku	18,459
Qarah Aghaj	6,102
Sahand	82,494
Sarab	45,031
Sardrud	29,739
Shabestar	22,181
Sharabian	4,877
Sharafkhaneh	4,244
Shendabad	8,489
Siah Rud	1,548
Sis	6,106
Sufian	9,963
Tabriz	1,558,693
Tark	2,031
Tasuj	7,522
Tekmeh Dash	2,974
Teymurlu	5,375
Torkamanchay	7,443
Varzaqan	5,348
Vayqan	4,678
Yamchi	10,392
Zarnaq	5,343
Zonuz	2,465

== Geography ==
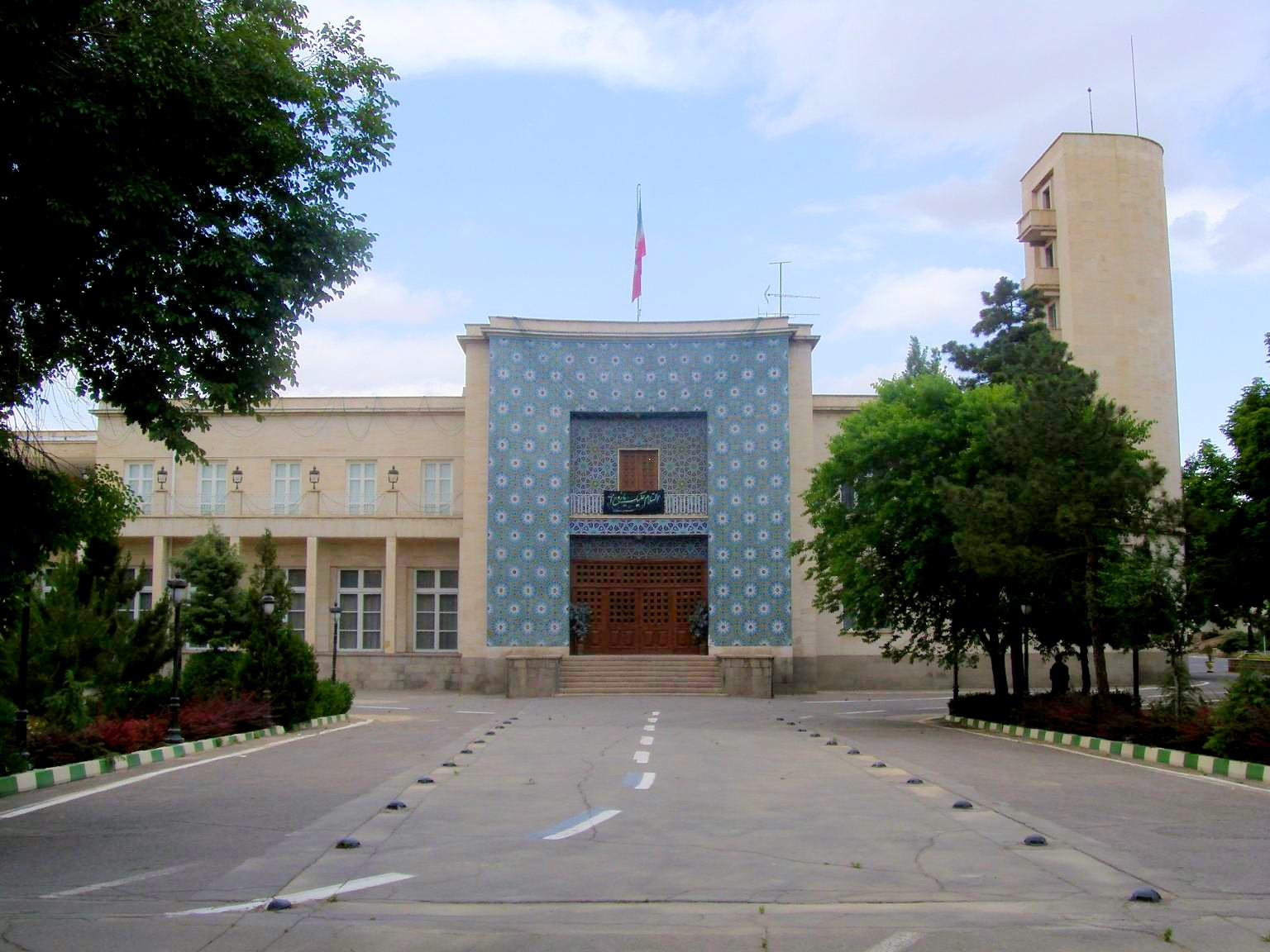
East Azerbaijan State Capital

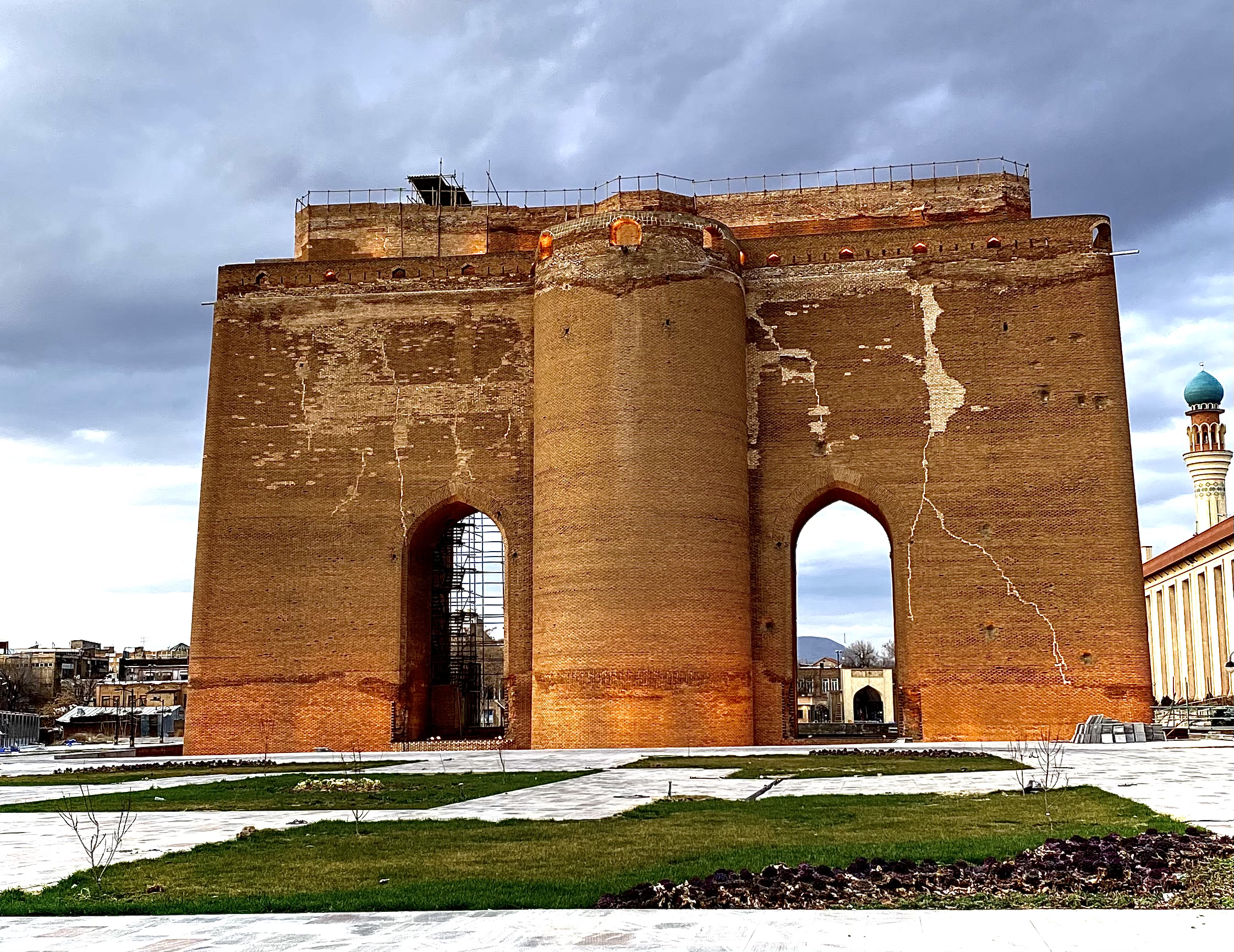
Arg-e Tabriz

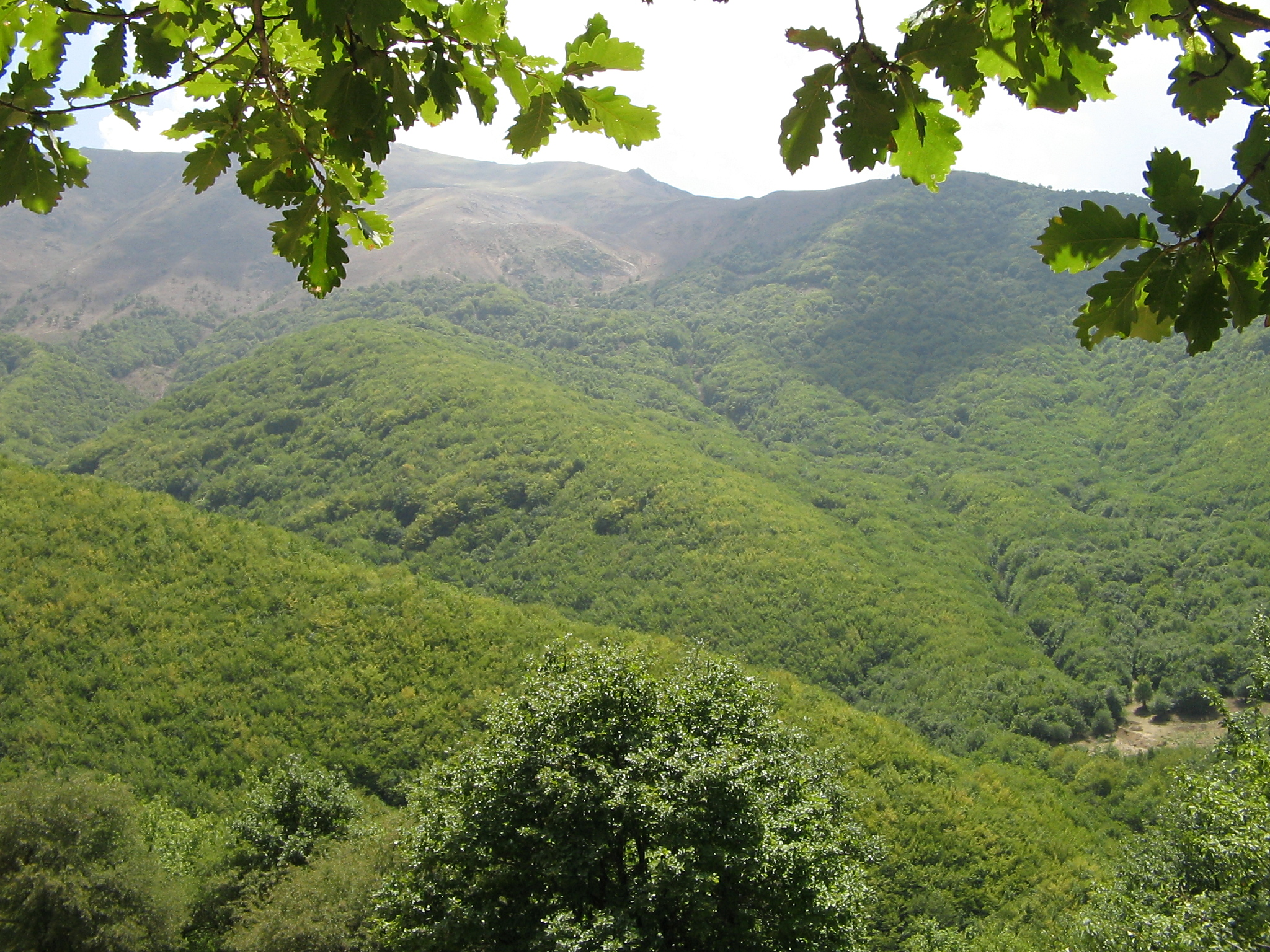
Arasbaran Forests, a UNESCO reserved biosphere

The province covers an area of approximately 47,830 km^{2}, it has a population of around four million people. The province has common borders with the Republic of Azerbaijan, Armenia and Autonomous Nakhchivan in the north, West Azerbaijan in the west, Zanjan in the south, and Ardabil in the east. A fine network of roads and railways connects East Azerbaijan to other parts of Iran and neighboring countries.

The highest point in East Azerbaijan is the volcanic peak of Sahand Mountain at 3,707 m (12,162 ft) of elevation, lying south of Tabriz, whereas the lower-lying areas are around Garmadooz (Ahar). The hills and mountains of the province are divided into three ranges: the Qara Daq Mountains, the Sahand and Bozqoosh Mountains, and the Qaflan Kooh Mountains.

=== Climate ===
The climate of East Azerbaijan is affected by Mediterranean Continental as well as the cold semi-arid climate. Gentle breezes off the Caspian Sea have some influence on the climate of the low-lying areas. Temperatures run up to 8.9 °C in Tabriz, and 20 °C in Maraqeh, in the winter dropping to −10 to −15 °C at least (depending on how cold the overall year is). The ideal seasons to visit this province are the spring and summer months.

Average monthly precipitation (in mm) for selected cities in East Azerbaijan
City	Jan	Feb	Mar	Apr	May	Jun	Jul	Aug	Sep	Oct	Nov	Dec	Year	Ref.
Tabriz	22.0	24.2	40.0	51.6	41.1	16.4	5.6	3.3	7.9	22.5	27.1	22.1	283.8	
Maragheh	27.7	30.5	46.1	61.6	32.0	7.4	2.2	1.5	4.6	22.9	41.6	31.8	309.9	
Ahar	16.8	19.1	32.9	45.2	48.9	23.8	6.7	6.2	12.7	26.9	26.4	19.6	285.2	
Sarab	15.2	14.7	23.5	47.0	41.1	15.5	12.0	9.1	7.6	21.5	21.7	12.6	241.5	
Mianeh	31.3	27.6	36.3	48.2	31.6	8.0	6.4	3.7	5.0	19.2	30.4	30.3	278.0	
Jolfa	9.0	11.4	22.4	36.0	37.0	21.5	7.6	4.2	9.7	17.9	17.1	12.4	206.2	
Kaleybar	20.5	26.6	41.9	69.6	69.5	28.8	21.4	9.5	21.3	28.3	29.6	19.8	386.8	
Sahand	17.1	11.9	22.3	49.2	34.3	5.8	8.1	1.3	2.5	12.6	20.5	17.1	202.7	
Bonab	30.5	17.1	29.5	68.8	25.9	4.3	5.1	0.6	0.8	6.0	35.9	26.4	250.9	
Marand	27.8	26.1	44.0	60.0	53.8	13.7	10.5	5.6	5.4	17.1	43.3	31.0	338.3	

== Culture ==
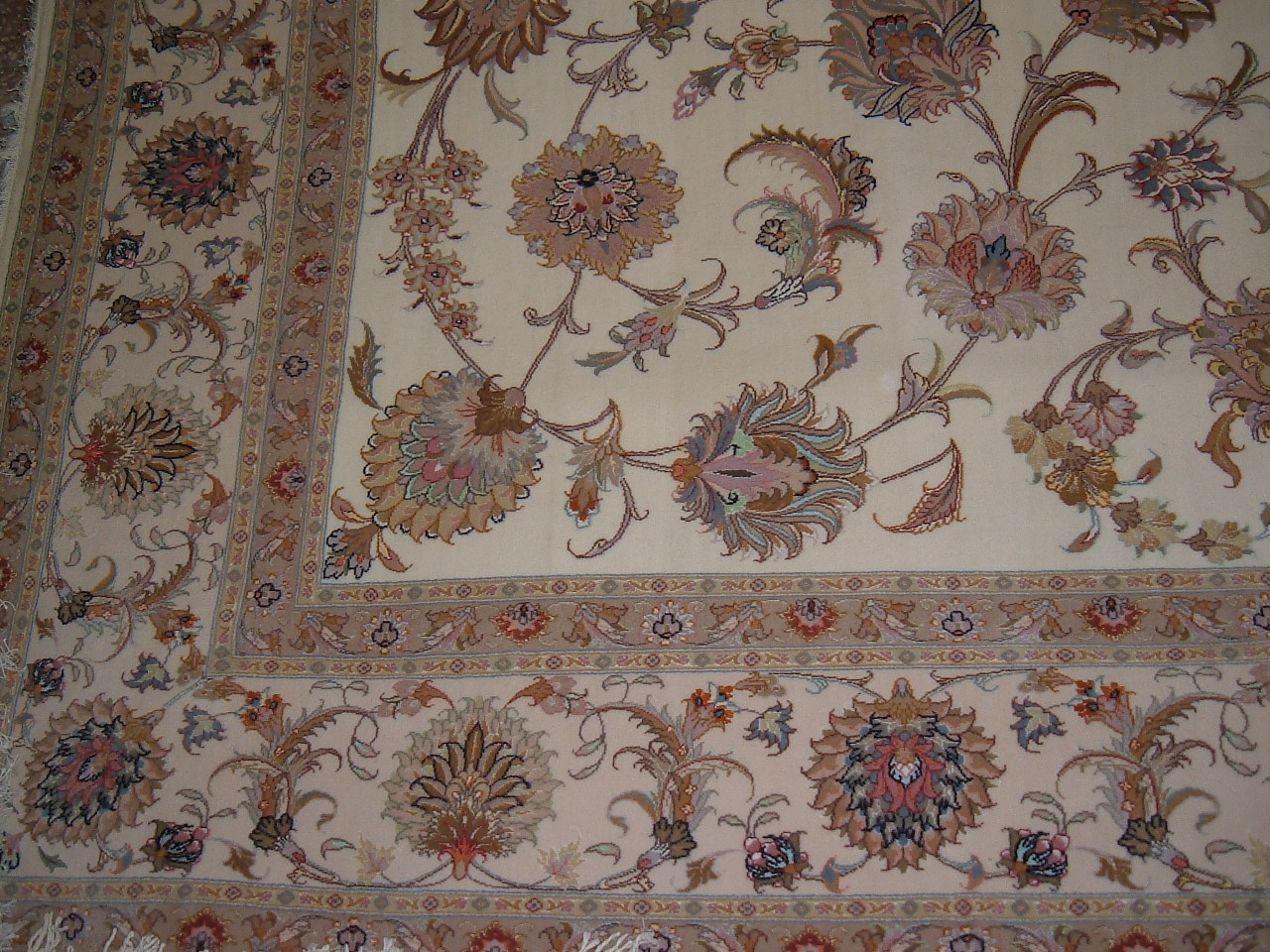
A sample of Tabriz rugs

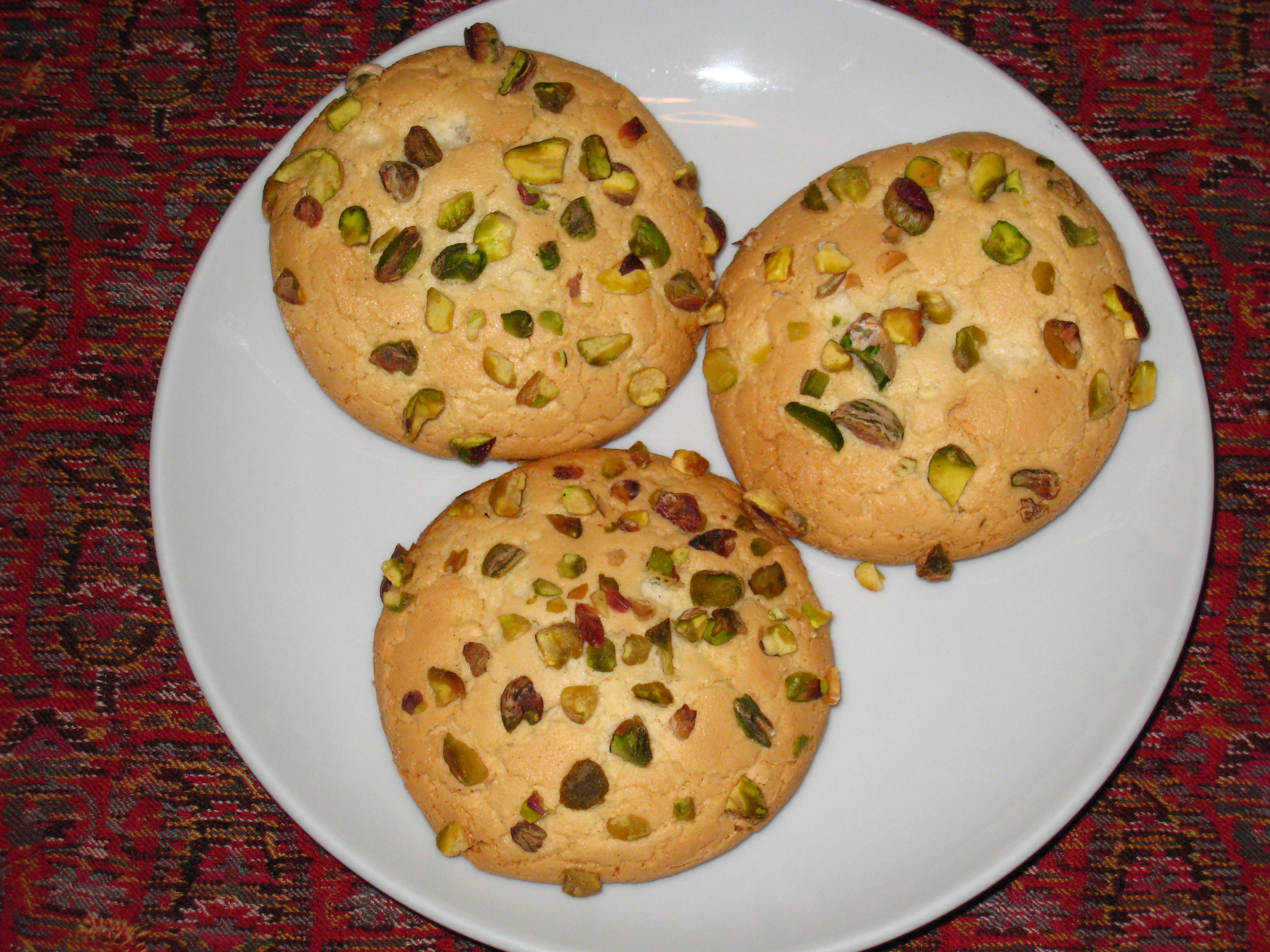
Ghorabiye (cookie in Azeri Turkish) of Tabriz

From a cultural point of view, the most outstanding features are the language, Azerbaijani, and folklore of this region. The language of Azerbaijan is originally "a branch of the Iranian languages known as Azari" (see Ancient Azari language). However, the modern Azeri language is a Turkic language very closely related to the language of Republic of Azerbaijan and Turkey. Apart from this, the province also boasts numerous learned scholars, gnostics, several national poets such as Mowlana Baba Mazeed, Khajeh Abdol Raheem Aj Abadi, Sheikh Hassan Bolqari, and Abdolqader Nakhjavani, to name a few, and the contemporary poet Ostad Mohammad Hossein Shahriyar. The current leader of Iran, Ali Khamenei, also originally comes from this region.

Iran's Cultural Heritage Organization has registered 936 sites of historical significance in the province. Some are contemporary, and some are from the antiquity of ancient Persia. "Zahak Citadel", for example, is the name of an ancient ruin in East Azerbaijan, which according to various experts, was inhabited from the second millennium BC until the Timurid era. First excavated in the 1800s by British archeologists, Iran's Cultural Heritage Organization has been studying the structure in 6 phases.

East Azerbaijan has many Azeri traditions. Many local dances and folk songs continue to survive among the various peoples of the province. As a longstanding province of Iran, Azerbaijan is mentioned on many occasions in Persian literature by Iran's authors and poets.

== East Azerbaijan today ==
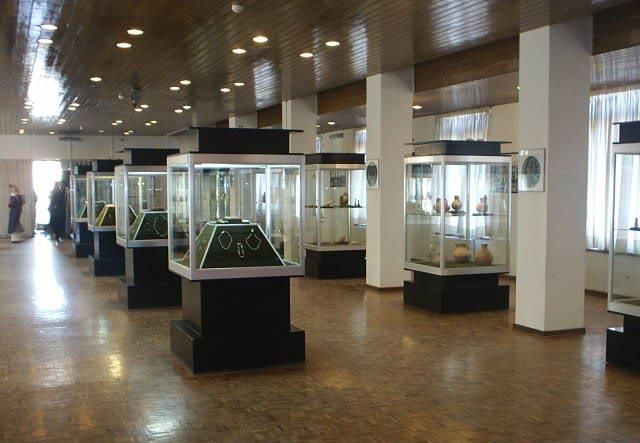
Azerbaijan Museum

Bank Sepah, Tabriz

East Azerbaijan province is an industrial centre of Iran. East Azerbaijan province has over 5000 manufacturing units (6% percent of national total). The value of product from these units in 1997 was US$374 million (373 billion rials = 4.07% of the national total). Total investments were valued at US$2.7 billion (2.4513 trillion rials) in 1997.

Some of the major industries in East Azerbaijan are glass industries, paper manufacturing, steel, copper and nepheline syenite, oil refinery, petrochemical processing facilities, chemical products, pharmaceutical processing, foundries, vehicle and auto-parts industries, industrial machines, agricultural machines, food industries, leather, and shoe industries.

East Azerbaijan has an excellent position in the handicraft industry of Iran, which has a large share in the exports of the province. Tabriz carpets are widely known around the world and in international markets for their vibrant designs and colors. At present there are about 66,000 carpet production units in the province, employing some 200,000 people. The annual production of these carpets is roughly 792,000 m^{2}, which comprises more than 70% of Iran's carpet exports. 35% of all Iranian carpets are produced in East Azerbaijan. East Azerbaijan province is also one of the richest regions of Iran in natural minerals, with 180 mines in 1997, of which 121 units are currently in operation, and the rest are being planned.

UNESCO has two Biosphere reserves in East Azerbaijan province. One in Lake Urmia and the other at Arasbaran.

== Colleges and universities ==
East Azerbaijan also has some of Iran's prestigious universities including:

- Sahand University of Technology
- Tabriz University of Medical Sciences
- University of Tabriz
- Azerbaijan University of Tarbiat Moallem
- Tabriz Islamic Arts University
- University of Maragheh
- Engineering and Technical College of Bonab
- Islamic Azad University of Bonab
- Islamic Azad University of Tabriz
- Islamic Azad University of Shabestar
- Islamic Azad University of Maragheh
- Islamic Azad University of Miyaneh
- University College of Nabi Akram, Tabriz

== Notable people ==
- Qatran Tabrizi, poet
- Ahmad Kasravi, historian
- Samad Behrangi
- Sattar Khan, revolutionary leader
- Bagher Khan, revolutionary leader
- Gayk Bzhishkyan
- Kazem Sadegh-Zadeh
- Parvin E'tesami, poet
- Karim Bagheri, soccer star
- Iraj Mirza, poet and politician
- Maqsud Ali Tabrizi
- Ivan Galamian
- Hassan Roshdieh
- Shams Tabrizi, mystic
- Vartan Gregorian, President of Carnegie Corporation
- Ali Salimi
- Ali Soheili, Prime Minister of Iran
- Ebrahim Hakimi, Prime Minister of Iran
- Mahmud Jam, Prime Minister of Iran
- Mohammad Hossein Shahriar
- Asadi Tusi is buried here

== See also ==
- Aras Free Zone
- List of East Azarbaijan cities and towns by population
- Media related to East Azerbaijan Province at Wikimedia Commons
