= Van–Sufian railway =

Railway line in Turkey and Iran

- An international passenger train at Kapıköy.

Overview
- Native name: Van–Sufian demiryolu
- Status: Operating
- Owner: Turkish State Railways
- Locale: Eastern Anatolia
- Termini: Van, Turkey; Sufian, Iran

Service
- Type: Heavy rail
- System: Turkish State Railways; Iranian Railways
- Operator: TCDD Taşımacılık

History
- Opened: 21 September 1971

Technical
- Line length: 257.5 km (160.0 mi)
- Num of tracks: Single track
- Track gauge: 1,435 mm (4 ft 8 1/2 in) standard gauge
- Electrification: No
- Operating speed: 80 km/h (50 mph)
- Signalling: Train order operation (Telefonla Merkezden Idare)
- Highest elevation: 2,150 m (7,050 ft)

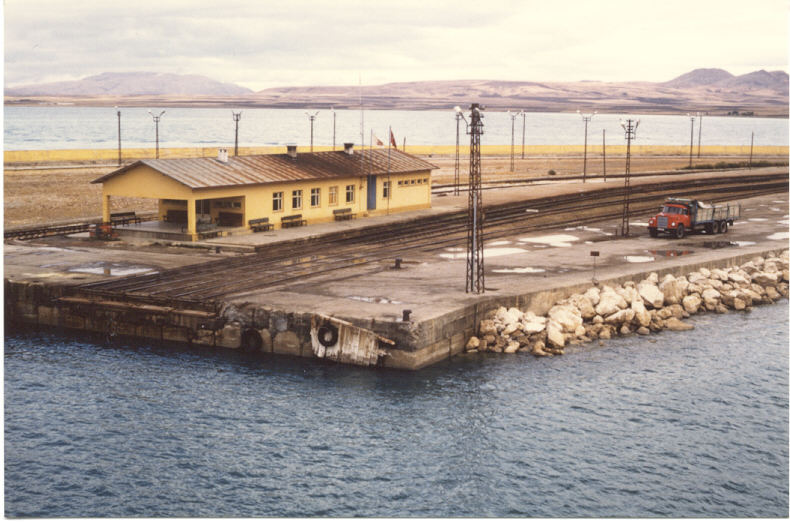
The western starting point of the railway, Van Pier.

The Van—Sufian railway (Turkish: Van-Sufian demiryolu, Persian: راه آهن وان-صوفيان) is a 362 kilometres (225 mi) long single track railway in eastern Turkey and western Iran. The railway begins at the Van Pier in Van, Turkey, on the eastern shore of Lake Van, and runs east to Sufian, Iran, where it connects to the Tabriz-Jolfa line.

The line crosses a pass at an altitude of 2150m, near the village of Çaybağı in the Saray. this is the highest of the Turkish railway network.

== Infrastructure and Route ==
The line start at the Van Pier railway station on the Van Lake. From there, the railway will skirt Van city from the north and reach Van railway station after 6.8km. This station is the line head station with a small maintenance facility and stabling yard for the line rolling stock. The line will then exit the station Southward and immediately take a 90° curve to go Eastward. It also start climbing to reach Çeken at an altitude of 1870m and then the bank of Lake Erçek at the altitude of 1830m. The line will follow the south bank of the river to reach the Özalp river valley. It will keep following this river until the city of Özalp, at an altitude of 2001m. From Özalp, the line will exit this valley and make a climb to a pass to the Çaybağı river. This river, also known as Qatur (or Qotur) in Iran is a tributary of the Aras. The highest point of pass near Çaybağı village is at an altitude of 2150m, which the highest on the Turkish railway network. From Çaybağı, the line will follow closely the river and descend to Kapıköy, the last station before the border. Kapıköy station has 6 siding tracks and a small yard, all dedicated to freight train custom inspection. The actual border is 2.7km after Kapıköy. The line will now enter Iran and continue to descent along the Qatur river bank to Razi, the first station on Iran side.

Despite being at high altitude, this line has no major bridges or tunnel. In all, it has 8 tunnels for a cumulative length of 2.7km. 4 tunnels are in fact man made snow shed, for a cumulative length of 1.0km.

Van-Kapıköy railway

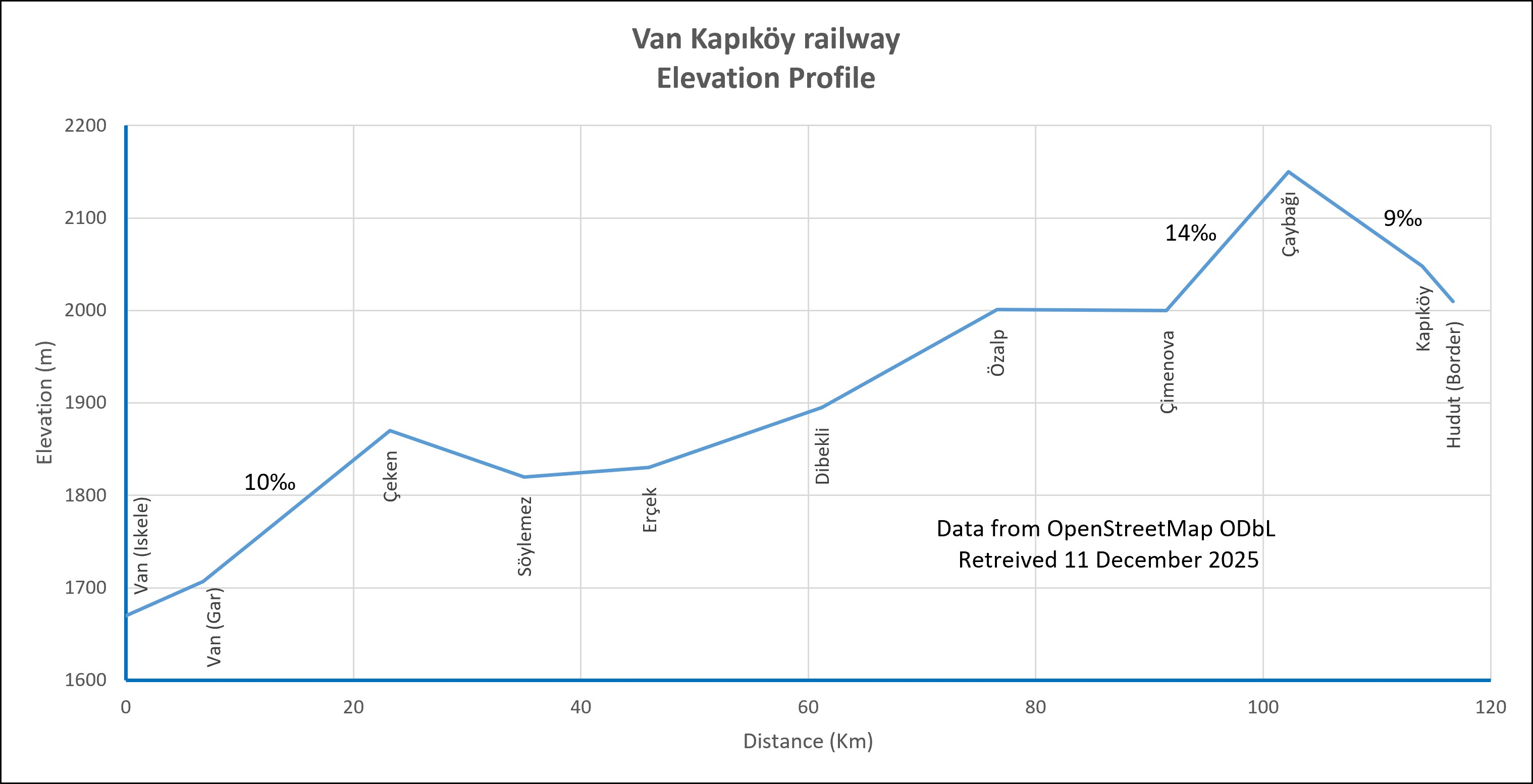
Van Kapıköy railway elevation graph

The line is single track, standard gauge, with passing sidings which are roughly 40km apart currently on average. The shortest sidings are about 750m long. The line is not electrified and operated with diesel traction.

The sidings are in the following stations:

Stations and sidings
Station	Kilometer point	Altitude (m)	number of sidings	Siding length (m)
Çeken	23.2	1870	1	750
Erçek	46.0	1830	1	830
Özalp	76.6	2001	2	830
Kapıköy	114.0	2048	6	1000

At the opening of the lines, there were also sidings in Söylemez (km 35.0); Dibekli (km 61.2); Çimenova (km 91.5) and Çaybağı (km 102.2). They have been abandoned. There are currently two turning triangles for turning locomotives still in use: in Van Gar, and in Kapıköy. There were also two additional turning triangles in Erçek and Çimenova for turning snowplows. They have been abandoned.

The line is operated under manual signaling (Telefonla Merkezden Idare). The trains proceeds from station to station under written train orders transmitted by a line dispatcher. Some stations are protected by a semaphore signal.

== Traffic ==
The line does not serve any town of importance. There is not a single industry along the line. The whole area is very sparsely populated. The only traffic is through traffic to Iran. But since the Iranian revolution in 1978, the traffic has been impacted by the various trade restrictions imposed on Iran and with sporadic suspensions of passenger traffic.

The freight traffic is also impacted by the ferry which is a bottleneck on the overall throughput capacity. The current capacity is two round trips per day, per boat, each carrying a 500m long train. This gives a total of 4 trains per day per direction maximum.

In its years, the line had a direct night train between Istanbul and Teheran: the Transasia Express.

== History ==
The oldest segment of the railway dates back to the early 20th century, during World War I, when a 53 km (33 mi) branch railway was built from Sufian to Sharafkhaneh.

The construction of a railway to Iran, via Van, was approved on 15 June 1937. The railway would continue east from Diyarbakır to Van and to the Iranian border at Kapıköy. Construction began shortly after and the railway reached Kurtalan in 1940. Due to the mountainous terrain between Kurtalan and Tatvan, the route was changed and its western starting became Elazığ. From Elazığ the railway would be built to Tatvan, via Muş, reaching Tuğ in 1964. A train ferry was established as a temporary means of transport between Tuğ and Van, as a bypass of Lake Van was planned.

In the 1960s, Turkey and Iran came to an agreement to construct a railway from Van to Sharafkhaneh.

CENTO sponsored a railway line, some of which was completed, to enable a rail connexion between London and Tehran via Van. The Van-Sufian railway from Lake Van in Turkey to Sharafkhaneh in Iran was completed and funded in large part by the Central Treaty Organisation (mainly the UK). The civil engineering was especially challenging because of the difficult terrain. Part of the route included a rail ferry across Lake Van with a terminal at Tatvan on the Western side of the lake. Notable features of the railway on the Iranian side included 125 bridges, among them the Towering Quotor span, measuring 1,485 feet (453 m) in length, spanning a gorge 396 feet (121 m) deep.

The Van-Razi segment opened on 29 October 1971, while the Razi-Sharafkhaneh segment opened in 1977.

== Operations ==
The railway is used primarily for freight rail, although the Iranian Railways operates passenger trains between Salmas and Sufian. The last passenger rail service in Turkey was suspended in July 2015, due to safety concerns regarding the Kurdish–Turkish conflict. Prior to suspension of passenger rail, the Trans-Asian Express used the railway between 2001 and 2015 on its journey from Istanbul, later Ankara, to Tehran. Other international trains were from Van to Tabriz and Damascus to Tehran. The latter was cancelled after the outbreak of the Syrian Civil War in 2011. A daily regional train also operated between Van and Özalp until 2015. The line is used mostly for through-traffic since freight rail facilities are minimal. The largest railyard along the route is in Van, adjacent to the city's railway station. Other small yards/sidings are located at Kapıköy and Razi.
