= Chelleh Khaneh =

Chelleh Khaneh or Cheleh Khaneh or Chellehkhaneh (Persian: چله خانه), also rendered as Chilakhana, may refer to:

- Chelleh Khaneh, Sarab
- Chelleh Khaneh-ye Olya, Shabestar County
- Chelleh Khaneh-ye Sofla, Shabestar County
- Chelleh Khaneh Rural District, in Shabestar County
