= Kapıköy railway station =

Railway station in Van, Turkey

Kapıköy

General information
- Location: Saray; Turkey
- Coordinates: 38.5100970°N 44.2952362°E
- Owner: Turkish State Railways
- Operator: TCDD Taşımacılık
- Line: Van-Kapıköy railway
- Platforms: 1 side platform
- Tracks: 7

Construction
- Structure type: At-grade
- Parking: none

History
- Opened: 1971
Location

Kapıköy railway station (Turkish: Kapıköy Tren İstasyonu) is the border railway station on the Van-Kapıköy railway, before entering Iran. The stations is located 2.7 km before the actual Turkey-Iran border.

The station was built at the bottom of the Çaybağı river valley, next to the river, at an altitude of 2048m. This river is also known as Qatur (or Qotur) in Iran. The valley is narrow and is fully occupied by the railway yard and the adjacent road. This geography constrained the design of the yard which is in two parts: 6 sidings along the main line, and another 6 tracks on a dead end on the Iran side.

The station name is derived from a nearby hamlet of the Yamanyurt neighbourhood, in the Saray district. This hamlet is located 1.6 km south as the crow flies, but 4 km through a winding road.

The station is not connected to any town or industry and its sole purpose is to allow custom and police inspection of the trains crossing the border. It allows also the switch of train traction from TCDD to RAI. The stations has no maintenance facility, no loading facility. It has a turning triangle for locomotive turning and a small shed for maintenance of way equipements.

The station was opened in 1971 by the Turkish State Railways.

== See also ==
- Van–Kapıköy railway
- Van–Sufian railway
