= Mehtar Ahmad =

Mehtar Ahmad مهتراحمد
- Village
- Location within Iran
- Coordinates: 38°15′12″N 45°52′51″E
- Country: Iran
- Province: East Azerbaijan
- County: Shabestar
- Bakhsh: Sufian
- Rural District: Mishu-e Jonubi

Population (2006)
  - Total: 250
- Time zone: UTC+3:30 (IRST)
  - Summer (DST): UTC+4:30 (IRDT)

Mehtar Ahmad (Persian: مهتراحمد, also Romanized as Mehtar Aḩmad; also known as Mahtarābād and Meytaramad) is a village in Mishu-e Jonubi Rural District, Sufian District, Shabestar County, East Azerbaijan Province, Iran. At the 2006 census, its population was 250, in 68 families.
