= Marv Dizaj =

Marv Dizaj مروديزج
- Village
- Location within Iran
- Coordinates: 38°17′37″N 46°04′08″E
- Country: Iran
- Province: East Azerbaijan
- County: Shabestar
- Bakhsh: Sufian
- Rural District: Chelleh Khaneh

Population (2006)
  - Total: 188
- Time zone: UTC+3:30 (IRST)
  - Summer (DST): UTC+4:30 (IRDT)

Marv Dizaj (Persian: مروديزج, also Romanized as Marv Dīzaj, Marov Dīzeh, and Morū Dīzaj; also known as Mārovī Dīzeh, Marovu-Diza, Marow Dīzaj, Mārvī Dīzeh, and Morovu Dīzeh) is a village in Chelleh Khaneh Rural District, Sufian District, Shabestar County, East Azerbaijan Province, Iran. At the 2006 census, its population was 188, in 47 families.
