= Van Pier railway station =

Railway station in Van, Turkey

VAN İSKELE
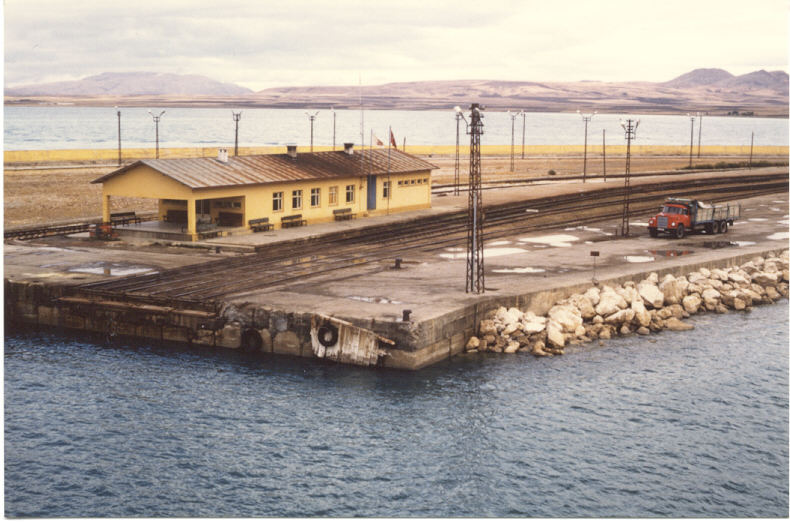
- Van pier in 1985.

General information
- Location: Göl 1 Sk., İskele Mah., 65040; Van Merkez/Van; Turkey
- Coordinates: 38.5170°N 43.3085°E
- System: TCDD ferry pier
- Owner: Turkish State Railways
- Operator: TCDD Taşımacılık
- Line: Van-Kapıköy railway
- Platforms: 1 island platform
- Tracks: 7

Construction
- Structure type: At-grade

History
- Opened: 1971

Services
Preceding station	TCDD Taşımacılık	Following station
Terminus	Trans-Asia Express Service suspended	Van towards Tehran
Tatvan Pier Terminus	Lake Van Ferry	Terminus
Location

Van Pier railway station (Turkish: Van İskele istasyonu) is a railway station and pier in Van, Turkey. Situated on the eastern shore of Lake Van, 5.8 km (3.6 mi) west of the city center, the station serves as a connection between modes of transport, with two slips carrying a total of seven tracks. TCDD Taşımacılık operates a ferry between Van and Tatvan, which also carries freight railcars and automobiles across the lake. Up until July 2015, the Trans-Asia Express, from Tehran, Iran, stopped at the station. Passengers would travel to Tatvan via ferry, where the western half of the train would continue to Ankara. As of mid-2015, freight trains are the only rail traffic at the station. Van Pier is the western terminus of the Van-Sufian railway, which is not connected to the rest of the Turkish railway network.

Van Pier station was opened in 1971 by the Turkish State Railways.
