= Zabarlu =

Zabarlu زبرلو
- Village
- Location within Iran
- Coordinates: 38°11′30″N 46°10′51″E
- Country: Iran
- Province: East Azerbaijan
- County: Shabestar
- Bakhsh: Sufian
- Rural District: Rudqat

Population (2006)
  - Total: 74
- Time zone: UTC+3:30 (IRST)
  - Summer (DST): UTC+4:30 (IRDT)

Zabarlu (Persian: زبرلو, also Romanized as Zabarlū, Zabarloo, Zaberlu, and Zebarlū; also known as Zabazlū, Zaberlyu, and Zabarlī) is a village in Rudqat Rural District, Sufian District, Shabestar County, East Azerbaijan Province, Iran. At the 2006 census, its population was 74, in 18 families.
