= Pardul =

Pardul پردول
- Village
- Location within Iran
- Coordinates: 38°13′00″N 46°11′25″E
- Country: Iran
- Province: East Azerbaijan
- County: Shabestar
- Bakhsh: Sufian
- Rural District: Rudqat

Population (2006)
  - Total: 322
- Time zone: UTC+3:30 (IRST)
  - Summer (DST): UTC+4:30 (IRDT)

Pardul (Persian: پردول, also Romanized as Pardūl, Pardool, and Pardowl; also known as Pardel, Pardol, Pardolī, Pardūli, Perdil, and Pordel) is a village in Rudqat Rural District, Sufian District, Shabestar County, East Azerbaijan Province, Iran. At the 2006 census, its population was 322, in 77 families.
