= Cheraghlu =

Cheraghlu (Persian: چراغلو) may refer to:

- Cheraghlu, Shabestar
- Cheraghlu, Varzaqan
