= Kohol, East Azerbaijan =

Kohol كهل
- Village
- Location within Iran
- Coordinates: 38°22′38″N 46°07′48″E
- Country: Iran
- Province: East Azerbaijan
- County: Shabestar
- Bakhsh: Sufian
- Rural District: Rudqat

Population (2006)
  - Total: 242
- Time zone: UTC+3:30 (IRST)
  - Summer (DST): UTC+4:30 (IRDT)

Kohol (Persian: كهل, also Romanized as Kahal; also known as Kahūl, Kogul’, and Kūqūl) is a village in Rudqat Rural District, Sufian District, Shabestar County, East Azerbaijan Province, Iran. At the 2006 census, its population was 242, in 63 families.
