= Qom Tappeh =

Qom Tappeh (Persian: قم تپه) may refer to:

- Qom Tappeh, Maragheh
- Qom Tappeh, Shabestar
