= Muhammad Shirin Maghribi =

Iranian poet and Sufi of the second half of the eighth century AH

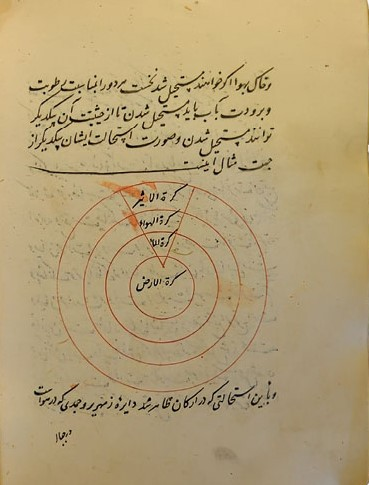
- "Diagram of the Transmutations of Four Elements." Folio from a copy of the al-Nuzha al-Sasaniyya by Muhammad Shirin Maghribi, dated before 1436 or 1485
- Born: 1349 Ammand, Chobanid kingdom
- Died: 1408 (aged 58–59) Tabriz
- Occupation: Poet, scholar
- Language: Persian, Old Azeri
- Notable works: Divan of Muhammad Shirin Maghribi al-Nuzha al-Sasaniyya

Muhammad Shirin Maghribi (Persian: محمد شیرین مغربی) was a Sufi poet and scholar, who is considered one of leading composers of Persian mystical poetry in the 14th-century.

== Life ==
Of Persian stock, Maghribi was born in 1349 in the village of Ammand, near the city of Tabriz. The area was part of the Azerbaijan region of northwestern Iran, which was then controlled by the Mongol Chobanid dynasty. His full name was "Abu Abdallah Muhammad ibn Izz al-Din Adil ibn Yusuf", while his takhallus (pen-name) was "Maghribi." The name, meaning "western", is a reference to Maghribi's spiritual inspiration coming from Ibn Arabi (died 1240), who was of "western" (Andalusian) origin. The two centuries that followed after Ibn Arabi's death, the majority of figures that followed and spread his teachings were from the Persianate world, Maghribi being one of them. Maghribi spread Ibn Arabi's teachings through oral instruction and his written works, such as his poetry.

Maghribi lived in Tabriz most of his life, but also visited other places. According to certain reports, he frequently visited the Gilan region. His treatise al-Nuzha al-Sasaniyya was dedicated to a certain Sasan, who is most likely the same person as Amir Sasan Shafti, the commander-in-chief of the army of Fuman. This indicates that he had cordial relations with the ruling class of the Sunni emirate of Fuman.

Maghribi died in 1408 in Tabriz.

== Role in the school of Ibn Arabi ==
Maghribi's poetry reflects the strong influence of Ibn Arabi. For example, in the introduction of his divan, he makes a comparison between his own poetry and Ibn Arabi's well-known poetical work Tarjuman al-Ashwaq ("The interpreter of desires").

== Works ==
Maghribi is known to have composed five works;

- (1) His divan (collection of poems) which is made up of 199 ghazals (odes), two tarji'band, and thirty-five ruba'iyyat in Persian, as well as one ghazal and fourteen dubayti in Old Azeri (Fahlaviyat).
- (2) Risala-yi Jam-i jahan-nama, a short Persian treatise that discusses the connections between many facets of divine unicity (tawhid) and how those connections relate to the diversity of the universe. Maghribi also expands on several passages from the introduction of Mashariq al-darari ("The orients of the radiant stars") by Sa'id al-Din Farghani (died 1300), a third-generation student of Ibn Arabi. The Risala-yi Jam-i jahan-nama uniqueness stems mostly from its straightforwardness, use of less complicated vocabulary, and inclusion of two illustrated diagrams. These components working together undoubtedly contributed to the text's enormous success. It was published in Tehran in 2014/15 by Abu Talib Mir-Abidini, but the historian Giovanni Maria Martini considers the edition to have "some problems both in the text and in the reproduction of the diagrams, which are small and not easily legible."
- (3) al-Durr al-farid fi ma'rifat maratib al-tawhid ("The unique pearl about the knowledge of the degrees of God’s oneness"), a three-chapter Persian treatise that explores the numerous ways that the idea of divine unicity has been understood. Despite not having been published, there are multiple manuscript copies of this work.
- (4) al-Nuzha al-Sasaniyya fi ma'rifat bad ijad nash'at al-'alam ila al-sura al-insaniyya ("Sasan's delight in the knowledge of the beginning of the existentiation of the world culminating in the human form"), a twelve-chapter Persian treatise on cosmology.
- (5) Asrar-i Fatiha ("The secrets of the Fatiha"), a treatise about the fatiha, which is the first surah (chapter) of the Quran. No version of this treatise has survived.

== Legacy and assessment ==
Maghribi is considered one of leading composers of Persian mystical poetry in the 14th-century.

== Sources ==
- Bosworth, C. E. (1987). "Azerbaijan iv. Islamic History to 1941". In Yarshater, Ehsan (ed.). Encyclopædia Iranica. Vol. III/2: Awāʾel al-maqālāt–Azerbaijan IV. London and New York: Routledge & Kegan Paul. pp. 224–231. ISBN 978-0-71009-114-7.
- Lewisohn, Leonard (1988). "Moḥammad Shirin Maghrebi". Sufi, A Journal of Sufism: 30–37.
- Martini, Giovanni Maria (2021a). "Muḥammad Šīrīn Maġribī (d. 810/1408) as a Key Agent in the Transmission of Akbarī Silsilas". Arabica. 68 (2–3). Brill: 35–94. doi:10.1163/15700585-12341599. S2CID 240603549.
- Martini, Giovanni Maria (2021b). "al-Nuzha al-Sāsāniyya by Shīrīn Maghribī (d. 810/1408)". Oriens. 49 (1–2). Brill: 35–94. doi:10.1163/18778372-20210001. S2CID 236343523.
- Martini, Giovanni Maria (2023). "Maghribī, Muḥammad Shīrīn". In Fleet, Kate; Krämer, Gudrun; Matringe, Denis; Nawas, John; Rowson, Everett (eds.). Encyclopaedia of Islam (3rd ed.). Brill Online. ISSN 1873-9830.
- Melville, Charles; Zaryab, Abbas (1991). "Chobanids". In Yarshater, Ehsan (ed.). Encyclopædia Iranica. Vol. V/5: Chinese-Iranian relations VIII–C̆ihrdād Nask. London and New York: Routledge & Kegan Paul. pp. 496–502. ISBN 978-0-939214-72-3.
