= Alucheh Malek =

Alucheh Malek الوچه ملك
- Village
- Location within Iran
- Coordinates: 38°24′18″N 46°14′39″E
- Country: Iran
- Province: East Azerbaijan
- County: Shabestar
- Bakhsh: Sufian
- Rural District: Rudqat

Population (2006)
  - Total: 140
- Time zone: UTC+3:30 (IRST)
  - Summer (DST): UTC+4:30 (IRDT)

Alucheh Malek (Persian: الوچه ملك, also Romanized as Ālūcheh Malek, Ālūcheh Molk, and Aloocheh Malek; also known as Alchamulk, Al’chamyul’k, Ālcheh Molk, Alcheh Molk, Ālūeheh Molk, and Alūjeh Molk; in Armenian: Ալչամուլք) is a village in Rudqat Rural District, Sufian District, Shabestar County, East Azerbaijan Province, Iran. At the 2006 census, its population was 140, in 36 families.
