= Lake Van Ferry =

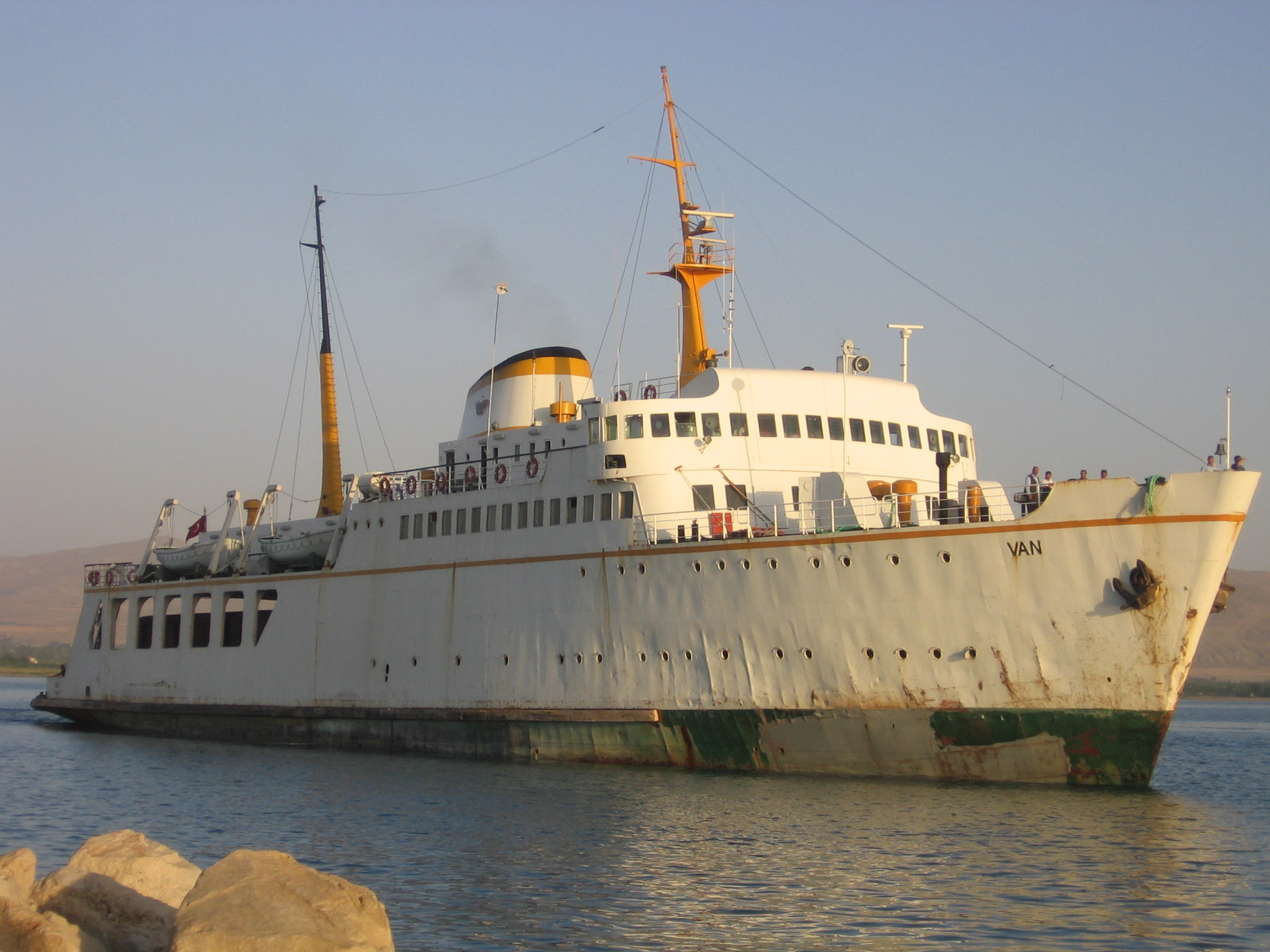
- Locale: Van and Tatvan, Turkey
- Waterway: Lake Van
- Transit type: Train/automobile/passenger ferry
- Operator: Turkish State Railways
- Began operation: 1971
- System length: 90.6 km (56.3 mi)
- No. of lines: 1
- No. of vessels: 2
- No. of terminals: 2 (Van, Tatvan)

The Lake Van Ferry (Turkish: Van Gölü Feribotu) is a passenger and train ferry service operated by the Turkish State Railways. It runs 90.6 kilometres (56.3 mi) in Lake Van between Van and Tatvan. Ferry service began operations in 1971, when a railway from Van to Sufian, Iran was built. The ferry carries mainly railcars across the lake along with passengers. Passengers of the weekly Trans-Asia Express used the ferry to bridge the gap between the two railways until the service was suspended in July 2015.

As of 2018, there are two operational ferries. These are new ferries, with greater capacity, ordered by the State Railways.

The new ferries require a loading ramp with four tracks, instead of three for the older boats. Accordingly the ramp was rebuilt in 2015, in time for the commissioning of the Sultan Alparslan ferry. From that date, the older ferries could no longer be used.

Van Lake Ferry boat list
Name	Year	Gross tonnage (t)	Scrapped
Orhan Atliman	1971	1918	2024
Refet Ünal	1972	1918	2025
Tatvan	1975	1766	2025
Van	1976	1766	2026
Sultan Alparslan	2015	6900	
Idris-i Bitlis	2018	6900	

The crossing took about 4 and a half hours with the four older ferries and 3 and a half hours with the two new ferries. The loading and unloading varies between 1 and 2 hours depending on the load and the conditions. Each ferry has the capacity of two round trips per day..

Sultan Alparslan and Idris-i Bitlis ferries have 4 tracks, 125m long each. This gives a total length of 500m of track. They have a 3870 tonnes.
