= LAR =

Lar or LAR may refer to:

== Places ==
India

- Lar, Uttar Pradesh, a town in Deoria District
- Lar (Jammu and Kashmir), a town
- Lata (region), also known as Lar, former region of southern Gujarat

Iran

- Lar, Iran, a city in Fars Province
- Lar, East Azerbaijan, a village
- Lar, or Sar, East Azerbaijan, a village
- Lar, Kohgiluyeh and Boyer-Ahmad, a village
- Lar, Markazi, a village
- Lar, Zanjan, a village
- Lar Rural District, a subdivision of Chaharmahal and Bakhtiari Province

== Transport ==
- LAR Romanian Airlines (Liniile Aeriene Române)
- Lara railway station, Victoria, Australia, V/Line station code
- Laramie Regional Airport, Wyoming, US, IATA code
- Latimer Road tube station, London, London Underground station code

== Other uses ==
- Lares, ancient Roman gods
- Lar gibbon (Hylobates lar)
- Light Armored Reconnaissance battalions of the US Marine corps
- Long-acting-release, a type of modified-release dosage form for medications
- Los Angeles Rams, a National Football League team that uses this abbreviation for box scores and television scoring displays
- Los Angeles Review
- Lower anterior resection
