= Central Treaty Organization =

Cold War military alliance (1955–1979)

- Flag

- CENTO members shown in green
- Abbreviation: CENTO
- Formation: 24 February 1955
- Dissolved: 16 March 1979
- Type: Intergovernmental military alliance
- Headquarters: Baghdad (1955–1958); Ankara (1958–1979)
- Region served: Eurasia
- Members: 5 states: Iran; Iraq (until 1959); Pakistan; Turkey; United Kingdom

The Central Treaty Organization (CENTO), formerly known as the Middle East Treaty Organization (METO) and also known as the Baghdad Pact, was a military alliance of the Cold War. It was formed on 24 February 1955 by Iran, Iraq, Pakistan, Turkey, and the United Kingdom. The alliance was dissolved on 16 March 1979.

U.S. pressure and promises of military and economic aid were key in the negotiations leading to the agreement, but the United States could not initially participate. John Foster Dulles, who was involved in the negotiations as United States Secretary of State under President Dwight D. Eisenhower, claimed that was due to "the pro-Israel lobby and the difficulty of obtaining Congressional Approval." Others said that the reason was "for purely technical reasons of budgeting procedures."

In 1958, the U.S. joined the military committee of the alliance. It is generally viewed as one of the least successful of the Cold War alliances.

The organization's headquarters was in Baghdad, Iraq, from 1955 to 1958 and thereafter in Ankara, Turkey, from 1958 to 1979. Cyprus was also an important location for CENTO due to the British military bases in Akrotiri and Dhekelia along with the island’s location in the Middle East.

== History ==
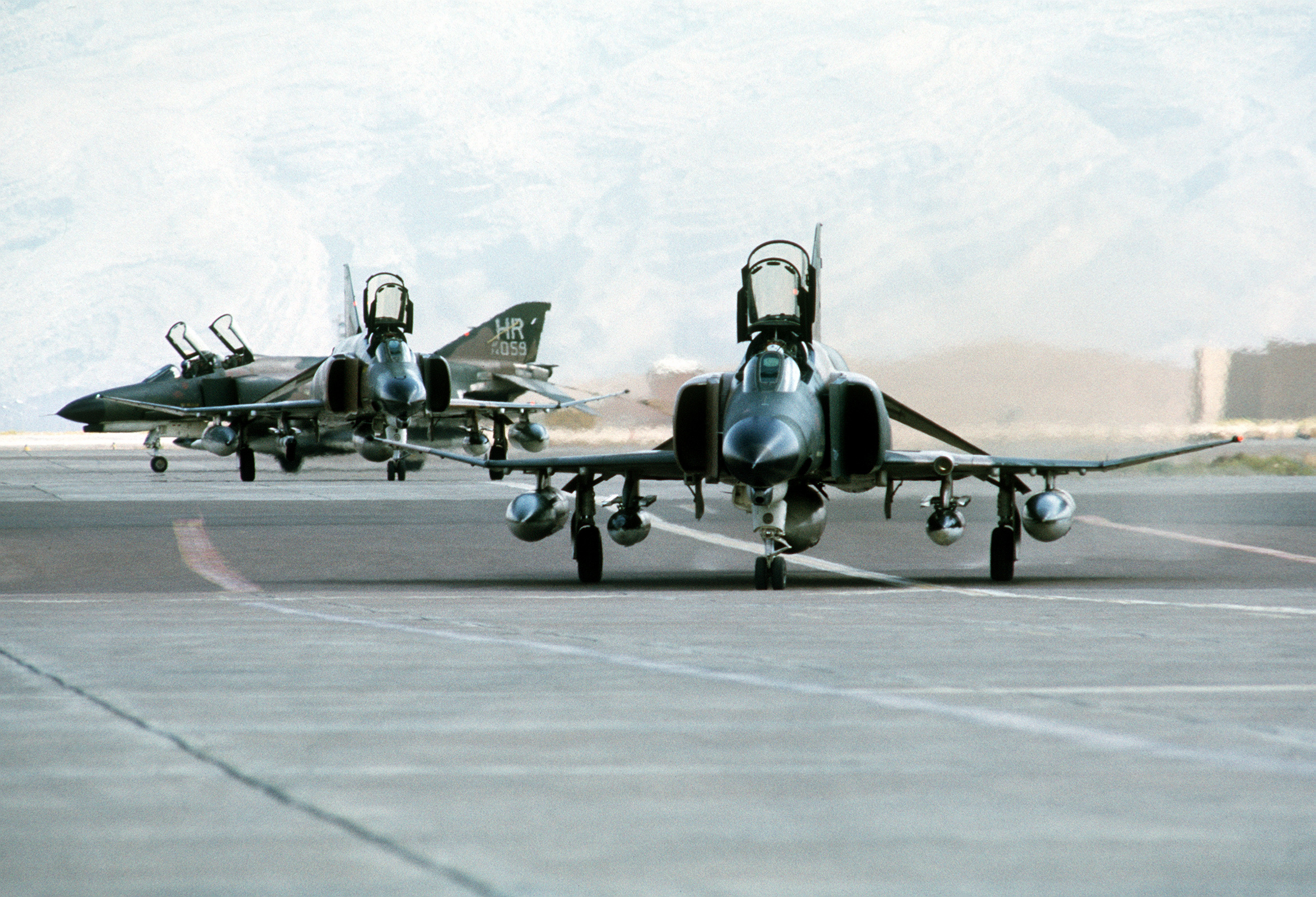
Three U.S. Air Force McDonnell Douglas F-4E Phantom II aircraft parked at Shiraz Air Base, Iran, during exercise Cento, 1 August 1977

Modeled after the North Atlantic Treaty Organization (NATO), METO committed the nations to mutual cooperation and protection, as well as non-intervention in each other's affairs. Its goal was to contain the Soviet Union (USSR) by having a line of strong states along the Soviet Union's southwestern frontier. Similarly, it was known as the 'Northern Tier' to prevent Soviet expansion into the Middle East. Unlike NATO, METO did not have a unified military command structure, nor were many American or British military bases established in member countries, although the United States had communications and electronic intelligence facilities in Iran, and operated U-2 intelligence flights over the Soviet Union from bases in Pakistan. The United Kingdom had access to facilities in Pakistan and Iraq at various times while the treaty was in effect.

On 14 July 1958, the Iraqi monarchy was overthrown in a military coup. The new government was led by military officer Abd al-Karim Qasim who withdrew Iraq from the Baghdad Pact, opened diplomatic relations with Soviet Union and adopted a non-aligned stance. The organization dropped the name 'Baghdad Pact' in favor of 'CENTO' at that time.

The Middle East and South Asia became extremely volatile areas during the 1960s with the ongoing Arab–Israeli conflict and the Indo-Pakistani wars. CENTO was unwilling to get deeply involved in either dispute. In 1965 and 1971, Pakistan unsuccessfully tried to get assistance in its wars with India through CENTO, but this was rejected under the idea that CENTO was aimed at containing the Soviet Union, not India. Before the Civil War in Pakistan and wars with India in 1965 and 1971, Pakistan's President Ayub Khan said that his nation was losing faith in the military pact due to its inability to assist its allies in 1962.

Universal Newsreel about the Baghdad Pact

CENTO did little to prevent the expansion of Soviet influence to non-member states in the area. Whatever containment value the pact might have had was lost when the Soviets 'leap-frogged' the member states, establishing close military and political relationships with governments in Egypt, Syria, Iraq, South Yemen, Somalia, and Libya. By 1970, the Soviet Union had deployed over 20,000 troops to Egypt, and had established naval bases in Syria, Somalia, and South Yemen.

The alliance's stance and perceived indifference toward Pakistan losing territory with Indian participation upon Bangladesh's independence in 1971 permanently damaged the alliance's reputation in Pakistan in particular and harmed its standing in general, as the lack of a collective response to a member's territorial integrity being challenged cast doubt on its efficacy and utility and generated skepticism that the alliance was mutually beneficial rather than a tool of Anglo-American and Western hegemony. Whereas other alliance members stayed out of the Indo-Pakistani wars on the grounds that the alliance didn't need to defend Pakistan since it was intended to contain the Soviet Union not India, Eastern Bloc members readily assisted less Western-friendly Arab governments' 1973 attack on Israel. Anti-Western interests engaged in a more activist foreign policy regionally by participating overtly in Middle Eastern conflicts in one form or another and one of the original arguments in favor of the increasingly passive alliance, that it'd serve as a valuable counterweight to the influence of Nasser's Soviet-friendly Arab nationalism, was discredited and weakened.

The Iranian Revolution spelled the end of the organization in 1979, but in reality, it essentially had been finished since 1974, when Turkey invaded Cyprus. This led the United Kingdom to withdraw forces that had been earmarked to the alliance – Nos 9 and 35 Squadrons flying Avro Vulcan bombers, and the United States Congress halted military aid to Turkey despite two presidential vetoes. With the fall of the Iranian monarchy, whatever remaining rationale for the organization was lost. Future U.S. and British defence agreements with regional countries – such as Pakistan, Egypt, and the Arab-Gulf states – were conducted bilaterally.

With the withdrawal of Iran, the Secretary-General of CENTO, Turkish diplomat Kamuran Gürun, announced on March 16, 1979, that he would call a meeting of the pact's council in order to formally dissolve the organization.

== Membership ==
- United Kingdom (since April 1955)
- Iraq (until March 1959)
- Iran (November 1955 — March 1979)
- Pakistan (September 1955 — March 1979)
- Turkey
  - Turkey's role in the Baghdad Pact was one of a unique and elevated nature compared to other nations such as Iraq. It was given "special" attention by the West primarily due to its geopolitical importance. It was believed that the Turks could draw Arab countries, such as Iraq, closer to the projected anti-communist Arab alliance, as the former would have been of inspiration for other "like-minded" countries. It was also hoped that by agreeing to the Baghdad Pact the Turkish and the Iraqi relations would get their time in the sun. However, this optimism was not rewarded as Iraq was under constant threat of the infiltration of Turkish troops [against Kurdish separatists], and Iraqi Prime Minister Nuri was desperate to strike an agreement. Finally, the Turkish courting by western nations, such as the US, did not have the outcome that was desired as Arab countries, primarily Egypt, turned hostile to the pact.

== Timeline ==
February 1954
Turkey signs a Pact of Mutual Cooperation with Pakistan.
May 19, 1954
US and Pakistan sign a Mutual Defense Assistance Agreement.
February 24, 1955
Iraq and Turkey sign a military agreement in Baghdad and the term "Baghdad Pact" started to be used. United Kingdom (April 5), Pakistan (September 23) and Iran (November 3) joined the Baghdad Pact in the same year.
October 1958
Baghdad Pact headquarters moved from Baghdad to Ankara.
March 5, 1959
U.S. signs military agreements with Pakistan, Iran and Turkey.
March 24, 1959
The new republican regime of Iraq withdrew the country from the alliance.
August 19, 1959
METO renamed CENTO.
1965
Pakistan tried to get help from its allies in its war against India. The United Nations Security Council passed Resolution 211 on September 20 and the United States and the United Kingdom supported the UN decision by cutting off arms supplies to both belligerents.
1971
In a new war with India, Pakistan again tried unsuccessfully to get allied assistance. (The U.S. provided limited military support to Pakistan, but not under the rubric of CENTO.)
1971
Bangladeshi independence causes the alliance to shrink for a second time as the newly sovereign country does not pursue CENTO membership.
1974
The United Kingdom withdraws forces from the alliance following the Turkish invasion of Cyprus.
March 11, 1979
The Interim Government of Iran withdraws the country from CENTO.
March 12, 1979
Pakistan withdraws from CENTO.
March 16, 1979
CENTO is formally disbanded. United Kingdom and Turkey withdraw from CENTO.

== Secretaries General ==
A Secretary General, appointed by the council of ministers for a renewable three years, oversaw CENTO activities. Secretaries general were:

| Name | State | In office |
|---|---|---|
| Awni Khalidy | Iraq | 1955 – December 31, 1958 |
| Osman Ali Baig | Pakistan | January 1, 1959 – December 31, 1961 |
| Abbas Ali Khalatbari | Iran | January 1962 – January 1968 |
| Turgut Menemencioğlu | Turkey | January 1968 – 1 February 1972 |
| Nasir Assar | Iran | February 1, 1972 – January 1975 |
| Ümit Haluk Bayülken | Turkey | January 1975 – August 1, 1977 |
| Sidar Hasan Mahmud | Pakistan | August 1977 – March 1978 |
| Kamuran Gürün | Turkey | March 31, 1978 – 1979 |

== CENTO railway ==
CENTO sponsored a railway line, some of which was completed, to enable a rail connection between London and Tehran via Van. A section from Lake Van in Turkey to Sharafkhaneh in Iran was completed and funded in large part by CENTO (mainly the UK). The civil engineering was especially challenging because of the difficult terrain. Part of the route included a rail ferry across Lake Van with a terminal at Tatvan on the Western side of the lake. Notable features of the railway on the Iranian side included 125 bridges, among them the Towering Quotor span, measuring 1,485 feet (453 m) in length, spanning a gorge 396 feet (121 m) deep.

== Cultural and research institutions ==
Like its counterparts NATO and SEATO, CENTO sponsored a number of cultural and scientific research institutions:

- CENTO Conferences on Teaching Public Health and Public Health Practice
- CENTO Cultural Works Programme
- CENTO Institute of Nuclear & Applied Science
- CENTO Scientific Coordinating Board
- CENTO Scientific Council
- CENTO Symposia on Rural Development

The institutions supported a wide range of non-military activities, with a particular focus on agriculture and development, In 1960, for example, CENTO had funded 37 projects covering agriculture, education, health, economic development and transportation. It also arranged at least one symposium on the problem of foot-and-mouth and rinderpest.

The organization that became the CENTO Institute of Nuclear Science was established by Western powers in the Baghdad Pact, as CENTO was then known. It was initially located in Baghdad, Iraq, but was relocated to Tehran, Iran in 1958 after Iraq withdrew from CENTO. Students from Pakistan and Turkey as well as those from Iran were trained at the Institute.

=== CENTO Scientific Council ===
The CENTO Scientific Council organized a number of scientific symposia and other events, including a meeting in Lahore, Pakistan, in 1962, entitled "The Role of Science in the Development of Natural Resources with Particular Reference to Pakistan, Iran and Turkey".

== See also ==
- ANZUS
- Arab–Israeli alliance
- Balkan Pact (1953)
- Economic Cooperation Organization
- Inter-American Treaty of Reciprocal Assistance
- Islamic Military Counter Terrorism Coalition (IMCTC)
- Mecca Defence Alliance
- NATO
- Regional Cooperation for Development
- Southeast Asia Treaty Organization
