= Bagh-e Vazir =

Village in East Azerbaijan province, Iran

Bagh-e Vazir Persian: باغ وزير
- Village
- Location within Iran
- Coordinates: 38°17′28″N 45°56′16″E
- Country: Iran
- Province: East Azerbaijan
- County: Shabestar
- District: Sufian
- Rural District: Mishu-e Jonubi

Population (2016)
  - Total: 558
- Time zone: UTC+3:30 (IRST)

Bagh-e Vazir (Persian: باغ وزير) (Note: Also romanized as Bāgh Vazīr, Bāgh-e Vazīr, and Bāgh-i-wazīr; also known as Badvazyr’) is a village in Mishu-e Jonubi Rural District of Sufian District in Shabestar County, East Azerbaijan province, Iran.

== Demographics ==
=== Population ===
At the time of the 2006 National Census, the village's population was 610 in 147 households. The following census in 2011 counted 411 people in 116 households. The 2016 census measured the population of the village as 558 people in 179 households.
