= Minavar =

Minavar (Persian: ميناور) may refer to:

- Minavar, Ardabil
- Minavar, East Azerbaijan
