= Torp, Iran =

Village in East Azerbaijan province, Iran

Torp Persian: ترپ
- Village
- Location within Iran
- Coordinates: 38°20′56″N 46°09′48″E
- Country: Iran
- Province: East Azerbaijan
- County: Shabestar
- District: Sufian
- Rural District: Rudqat

Population (2016)
  - Total: 648
- Time zone: UTC+3:30 (IRST)

Torp (Persian: ترپ) (Note: Also romanized as Tarop; also known as Torb and Tūrp) is a village in Rudqat Rural District of Sufian District in Shabestar County, East Azerbaijan province, Iran.

== Demographics ==
=== Population ===
At the time of the 2006 National Census, the village's population was 726 in 208 households. The following census in 2011 counted 670 people in 214 households. The 2016 census measured the population of the village as 648 people in 235 households.
