= Khvajeh Marjan =

Village in East Azerbaijan province, Iran

Khvajeh Marjan Persian: خواجه مرجان
- Village
- Location within Iran
- Coordinates: 38°13′46″N 46°05′43″E
- Country: Iran
- Province: East Azerbaijan
- County: Shabestar
- District: Sufian
- Rural District: Chelleh Khaneh

Population (2016)
  - Total: 739
- Time zone: UTC+3:30 (IRST)

Khvajeh Marjan (Persian: خواجه مرجان) (Note: Also romanized as Khvājeh Marjān; also known as Haji Mijan and Khadzhi Myurdzhan) is a village in Chelleh Khaneh Rural District of Sufian District in Shabestar County, East Azerbaijan province, Iran.

== Demographics ==
=== Population ===
At the time of the 2006 National Census, the village's population was 631 in 152 households. The following census in 2011 counted 495 people in 155 households. The 2016 census measured the population of the village as 739 people in 215 households.
