= Tatvan Pier railway station =

Railway station in Bitlis, Turkey

TATVAN İSKELE
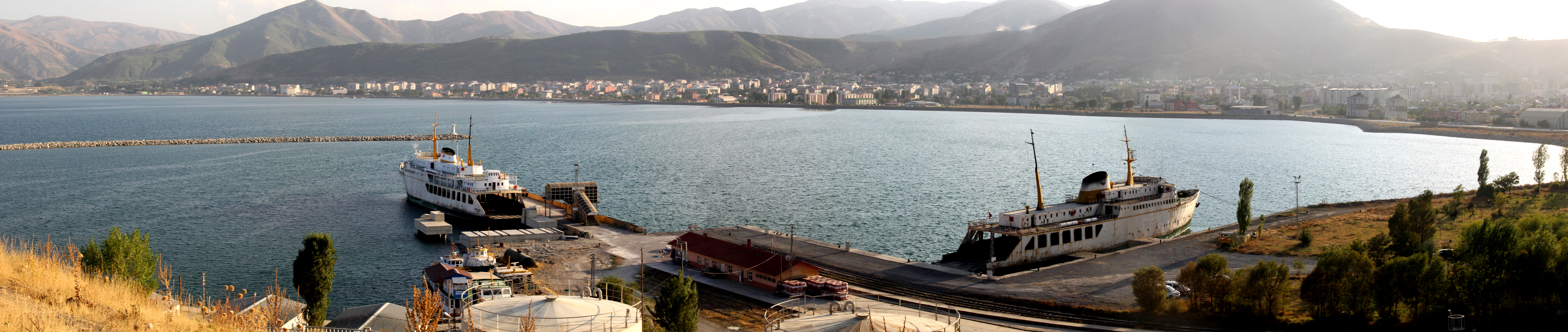

General information
- Location: Tatvan İskelesi, Şirinevler Mah., 13200; Tatvan/Bitlis; Turkey
- Coordinates: 38.5135°N 42.2972°E
- System: TCDD ferry pier
- Owner: Turkish State Railways
- Operator: TCDD Taşımacılık
- Line: Lake Van Ferry
- Platforms: 1 island platform
- Tracks: 7

Construction
- Structure type: At-grade

History
- Opened: 24 October 1964

Services
Preceding station	TCDD Taşımacılık	Following station
Tatvan towards Ankara	Trans-Asia Express Service suspended	Terminus
Terminus	Lake Van Ferry	Van Pier Terminus
Location

Tatvan Pier railway station (Turkish: Tatvan İskele istasyonu) is a railway station and pier in Tatvan, Turkey. Situated on the western shore of Lake Van, the station serves as a connection between modes of transport, with two slips carrying a total of seven tracks. TCDD Taşımacılık operates a ferry, the Lake Van Ferry, between Tatvan and Van, which carries passengers freight railcars and vehicles across the lake. Up until July 2015, the Trans-Asia Express, from Ankara, stopped at the station. Passengers would travel to Van via ferry, where the eastern half of the train would continue to Tehran, Iran. As of mid-2015, freight trains are the only rail traffic at the station.
