= Golabad, Shabestar =

Village in East Azerbaijan province, Iran

Sarkand-e Dizaj Persian: گل اباد
- Village
- Location within Iran
- Coordinates: 38°14′29″N 45°51′13″E
- Country: Iran
- Province: East Azerbaijan
- County: Shabestar
- District: Sufian
- Rural District: Mishu-e Jonubi

Population (2016)
  - Total: 531
- Time zone: UTC+3:30 (IRST)

Golabad (Persian: گل اباد) (Note: Also romanized as Golābād; also known as Kūlavān, Kulavar, and Kyulava) is a village in Mishu-e Jonubi Rural District of Sufian District in Shabestar County, East Azerbaijan province, Iran.

== Demographics ==
=== Population ===
At the time of the 2006 National Census, the village's population was 766 in 186 households. The following census in 2011 counted 654 people in 183 households. The 2016 census measured the population of the village as 531 people in 189 households.
