= Sefid Kamar =

Sefid Kamar or Safid Kamar (Persian: سفيدكمر) may refer to:

- Sefid Kamar, East Azerbaijan
- Sefid Kamar, Kurdistan
- Sefid Kamar, Zanjan
