= Nematollah =

Village in East Azerbaijan province, Iran

Nematollah Persian: نعمت الله
- Village
- Location within Iran
- Coordinates: 38°14′22″N 45°54′24″E
- Country: Iran
- Province: East Azerbaijan
- County: Shabestar
- District: Sufian
- Rural District: Mishu-e Jonubi

Population (2016)
  - Total: 1,014
- Time zone: UTC+3:30 (IRST)

Nematollah (Persian: نعمت الله) (Note: Also romanized as Ne‘matollāh; also known as Neimatullah) is a village in, and the capital of, Mishu-e Jonubi Rural District in Sufian District of Shabestar County, East Azerbaijan province, Iran.

== Demographics ==
=== Population ===
At the time of the 2006 National Census, the village's population was 771 in 195 households. The following census in 2011 counted 429 people in 128 households. The 2016 census measured the population of the village as 1,014 people in 307 households.
