= Harzanaq =

Harzanaq هرزنق
- Village
- Location within Iran
- Coordinates: 38°14′42″N 46°11′01″E
- Country: Iran
- Province: East Azerbaijan
- County: Shabestar
- Bakhsh: Sufian
- Rural District: Rudqat

Population (2006)
  - Total: 111
- Time zone: UTC+3:30 (IRST)
  - Summer (DST): UTC+4:30 (IRDT)

Harzanaq (Persian: هرزنق, also Romanized as Arzaneh, Arzang, Barzanaq, Erzenek, and Harzanaghé Roodghat) is a village in Rudqat Rural District, Sufian District, Shabestar County, East Azerbaijan Province, Iran. At the 2006 census, its population was 111, in 32 families.
