= Ivand, East Azerbaijan =

Village in East Azerbaijan province, Iran

Ivand Persian: ايوند
- Village
- Location within Iran
- Coordinates: 38°20′55″N 46°07′00″E
- Country: Iran
- Province: East Azerbaijan
- County: Shabestar
- District: Sufian
- Rural District: Rudqat

Population (2016)
  - Total: 1,043
- Time zone: UTC+3:30 (IRST)

Ivand (Persian: ايوند) (Note: Also romanized as Īvand; also known as Uvand) is a village in Rudqat Rural District of Sufian District in Shabestar County, East Azerbaijan province, Iran.

== Demographics ==
=== Population ===
At the time of the 2006 National Census, the village's population was 1,312 in 328 households. The following census in 2011 counted 1,161 people in 328 households. The 2016 census measured the population of the village as 1,043 people in 331 households.
