= Tazeh Kand, Chelleh Khaneh =

Village in East Azerbaijan province, Iran

Tazeh Kand Persian: تازه كند
- Village
- Location within Iran
- Coordinates: 38°12′30″N 46°07′31″E
- Country: Iran
- Province: East Azerbaijan
- County: Shabestar
- District: Sufian
- Rural District: Chelleh Khaneh

Population (2016)
  - Total: 914
- Time zone: UTC+3:30 (IRST)

Tazeh Kand (Persian: تازه كند) (Note: Also romanized as Tāzeh Kand; also known as Maḩmūdābād and Taza-kend) is a village in Chelleh Khaneh Rural District of Sufian District in Shabestar County, East Azerbaijan province, Iran.

== Demographics ==
=== Population ===
At the time of the 2006 National Census, the village's population was 973 in 229 households. The following census in 2011 counted 728 people in 215 households. The 2016 census measured the population of the village as 914 people in 325 households.
