= Zeynabad, East Azerbaijan =

Village in East Azerbaijan province, Iran

Zeynabad Persian: زين اباد
- Village
- Location within Iran
- Coordinates: 38°16′43″N 46°07′13″E
- Country: Iran
- Province: East Azerbaijan
- County: Shabestar
- District: Sufian
- Rural District: Rudqat

Population (2016)
  - Total: 861
- Time zone: UTC+3:30 (IRST)

Zeynabad (Persian: زين اباد) (Note: Also romanized as Zeinabad) is a village in Rudqat Rural District of Sufian District in Shabestar County, East Azerbaijan province, Iran.

== Demographics ==
=== Population ===
At the time of the 2006 National Census, the village's population was 887 in 205 households. The following census in 2011 counted 887 people in 245 households. The 2016 census measured the population of the village as 861 people in 248 households.
