= Arzang =

Arzang may refer to:

- Arzhang, a Manichaean holy book
- Arzang, Iran, a village in East Azerbaijan Province, Iran
