= Sarkand-e Dizaj =

Village in East Azerbaijan province, Iran

Sarkand-e Dizaj Persian: سركنديزج
- Village
- Location within Iran
- Coordinates: 38°14′44″N 45°51′46″E
- Country: Iran
- Province: East Azerbaijan
- County: Shabestar
- District: Sufian
- Rural District: Mishu-e Jonubi

Population (2016)
  - Total: 568
- Time zone: UTC+3:30 (IRST)

Sarkand-e Dizaj (Persian: سركنديزج) (Note: Also romanized as Sarkand Dīzaj and Sarkand-e Dīzaj; also known as Bas Kandīzaj, Sarkandīzaj, Sarkandīzeh, Sarkaydiza, Sarkdīzaj, and Sūchān Dīzeh) is a village in Mishu-e Jonubi Rural District of Sufian District in Shabestar County, East Azerbaijan province, Iran.

== Demographics ==
=== Population ===
At the time of the 2006 National Census, the village's population was 728 in 247 households. The following census in 2011 counted 636 people in 212 households. The 2016 census measured the population of the village as 568 people in 214 households.
