= Kond Rud, Shabestar =

Village in East Azerbaijan province, Iran

Kond Rud Persian: كندرود
- Village
- Location within Iran
- Coordinates: 38°14′45″N 45°51′00″E
- Country: Iran
- Province: East Azerbaijan
- County: Shabestar
- District: Sufian
- Rural District: Mishu-e Jonubi

Population (2016)
  - Total: 658
- Time zone: UTC+3:30 (IRST)

Kond Rud (Persian: كندرود) (Note: Also romanized as Kond Rūd; also known as Kand Roodé Arvanagh, Kondo Rūd, Kondor, Kondūr, Kundur, Kyundur, and Sarkand Rūd) is a village in Mishu-e Jonubi Rural District of Sufian District in Shabestar County, East Azerbaijan province, Iran.

== Demographics ==
=== Population ===
At the time of the 2006 National Census, the village's population was 580 in 187 households. The following census in 2011 counted 537 people in 178 households. The 2016 census measured the population of the village as 658 people in 245 households.
