= Kalankash =

Village in East Azerbaijan province, Iran

Kalankash Persian: كلانكش
- Village
- Location within Iran
- Coordinates: 38°17′26″N 46°05′56″E
- Country: Iran
- Province: East Azerbaijan
- County: Shabestar
- District: Sufian
- Rural District: Rudqat

Population (2016)
  - Total: 981
- Time zone: UTC+3:30 (IRST)

Kalankash (Persian: كلانكش) (Note: Also romanized as Kalānkash, Kalānkesh, and Kolankesh; also known as Kalānkish and Kelen-ki) is a village in Rudqat Rural District of Sufian District in Shabestar County, East Azerbaijan province, Iran.

== Demographics ==
=== Population ===
At the time of the 2006 National Census, the village's population was 871 in 205 households. The following census in 2011 counted 1,026 people in 266 households. The 2016 census measured the population of the village as 981 people in 270 households.
