= Sefid Kamar, East Azerbaijan =

Sefid Kamar سفيدكمر
- Village
- Location within Iran
- Coordinates: 38°16′03″N 45°54′24″E
- Country: Iran
- Province: East Azerbaijan
- County: Shabestar
- Bakhsh: Sufian
- Rural District: Mishu-e Jonubi

Population (2006)
  - Total: 648
- Time zone: UTC+3:30 (IRST)
  - Summer (DST): UTC+4:30 (IRDT)

Sefid Kamar (Persian: سفيدكمر, also Romanized as Sefīd Kamar; also known as Asem Kamar, Esmīshamr, Ismichamr’, and Ismishamar) is a village in Mishu-e Jonubi Rural District, Sufian District, Shabestar County, East Azerbaijan Province, Iran. At the 2006 census, its population was 648, in 189 families.
