= Ali Akbarlu =

Village in East Azerbaijan province, Iran

Ali Akbarlu Persian: علي اكبرلوه
- Village
- Location within Iran
- Coordinates: 38°14′26″N 45°53′15″E
- Country: Iran
- Province: East Azerbaijan
- County: Shabestar
- District: Sufian
- Rural District: Mishu-e Jonubi

Population (2016)
  - Total: 799
- Time zone: UTC+3:30 (IRST)

Ali Akbarlu (Persian: علي اكبرلو) (Note: Also romanized as ‘Alī Akbarloo, ‘Alī Akbarlū, and ‘Alīakbarlū; also known as Alagper and ‘Alī Akbar) is a village in Mishu-e Jonubi Rural District of Sufian District in Shabestar County, East Azerbaijan province, Iran.

== Demographics ==
=== Population ===
At the time of the 2006 National Census, the village's population was 746 in 181 households. The following census in 2011 counted 700 people in 185 households. The 2016 census measured the population of the village as 799 people in 241 households.
