= Monavvar =

Monavvar منور
- Village
- Location within Iran
- Coordinates: 38°19′17″N 46°13′54″E
- Country: Iran
- Province: East Azerbaijan
- County: Shabestar
- Bakhsh: Sufian
- Rural District: Rudqat

Population (2006)
  - Total: 377
- Time zone: UTC+3:30 (IRST)
  - Summer (DST): UTC+4:30 (IRDT)

Monavvar (Persian: منور, also Romanized as Monawar; also known as Minavar; in Armenian: Մինաւար) is a village in Rudqat Rural District, Sufian District, Shabestar County, East Azerbaijan Province, Iran. At the 2006 census, its population was 377, in 99 families.
