= Cheraghlu, Shabestar =

Cheraghlu چراغلو
- Village
- Location within Iran
- Coordinates: 38°23′05″N 46°14′25″E
- Country: Iran
- Province: East Azerbaijan
- County: Shabestar
- Bakhsh: Sufian
- Rural District: Rudqat

Population (2006)
  - Total: 47
- Time zone: UTC+3:30 (IRST)
  - Summer (DST): UTC+4:30 (IRDT)

Cheraghlu (Persian: چراغلو, also Romanized as Cherāghlū; also known as Cherāghlī) is a village in Rudqat Rural District, Sufian District, Shabestar County, East Azerbaijan Province, Iran. At the 2006 census, its population was 47, in 9 families.
