= LARS =

LARS may refer to:

- L.A.R.S. (Last American Rock Stars), a rap group
- Launch and recovery system (diving)
- Least-angle regression, a regression algorithm for high-dimensional data
- Lesotho Amateur Radio Society
- Leucyl-tRNA synthetase, a human gene
- Light Artillery Rocket System
- Long Ashton Research Station
- Lower anterior resection syndrome

== See also ==
- Lars, a given name
- LAR (disambiguation)
