= Karnow =

Karnow may refer to:

- Stanley Karnow, American journalist
- Karnow, Iran, a village in East Azerbaijan Province, Iran
