= Mazraeh, Shabestar =

Village in East Azerbaijan province, Iran

Mazraeh Persian: مزرعه
- Village
- Location within Iran
- Coordinates: 38°16′54″N 46°09′53″E
- Country: Iran
- Province: East Azerbaijan
- County: Shabestar
- District: Sufian
- Rural District: Rudqat

Population (2016)
  - Total: 1,558
- Time zone: UTC+3:30 (IRST)

Mazraeh (Persian: مزرعه) (Note: Also romanized as Mazra‘eh; also known as Marz, Mazra‘, and Mezre) is a village in Rudqat Rural District of Sufian District in Shabestar County, East Azerbaijan province, Iran.

== Demographics ==
=== Population ===
At the time of the 2006 National Census, the village's population was 1,220 in 300 households. The following census in 2011 counted 1,430 people in 407 households. The 2016 census measured the population of the village as 1,558 people in 495 households.
