= Lar, East Azerbaijan =

Lar لار
- Village
- Location within Iran
- Coordinates: 38°24′53″N 46°13′11″E
- Country: Iran
- Province: East Azerbaijan
- County: Shabestar
- Bakhsh: Sufian
- Rural District: Rudqat

Population (2006)
  - Total: 530
- Time zone: UTC+3:30 (IRST)
  - Summer (DST): UTC+4:30 (IRDT)

Lar (Persian: لار, also Romanized as Lār; also known as Lārī, Īl Ārī, and Iliari) is a village in Rudqat Rural District, Sufian District, Shabestar County, East Azerbaijan Province, Iran. At the 2006 census, its population was 530, in 102 families.
