= Andabil =

Andabil (Persian: اندبيل) may refer to:

- Andabil, Ardabil
- Andabil, East Azerbaijan
