= Chelleh Khaneh-ye Sofla =

Chelleh Khaneh-ye Sofla چله خانه سفلي
- Village
- Location within Iran
- Coordinates: 38°14′32″N 46°03′27″E
- Country: Iran
- Province: East Azerbaijan
- County: Shabestar
- Bakhsh: Sufian
- Rural District: Chelleh Khaneh

Population (2006)
  - Total: 367
- Time zone: UTC+3:30 (IRST)
  - Summer (DST): UTC+4:30 (IRDT)

Chelleh Khaneh-ye Sofla (Persian: چله خانه سفلي, also Romanized as Chelleh Khāneh-ye Soflá and Chellah Khāneh-Ye Soflá; also known as Ashāqī Chelleh Khāneh, Chellah Khāneh Pā’īn, Chelleh Khāneh Pā’īn, Chelleh Khāneh-ye Ashāqī, Chelleh Khāneh-ye Pā’īn, Chilakhana-Ashaga, and Chilakhāna Ashāghi) is a village in Chelleh Khaneh Rural District, Sufian District, Shabestar County, East Azerbaijan Province, Iran. At the 2006 census, its population was 367, in 74 families.
