= Qatur River =

Qotur
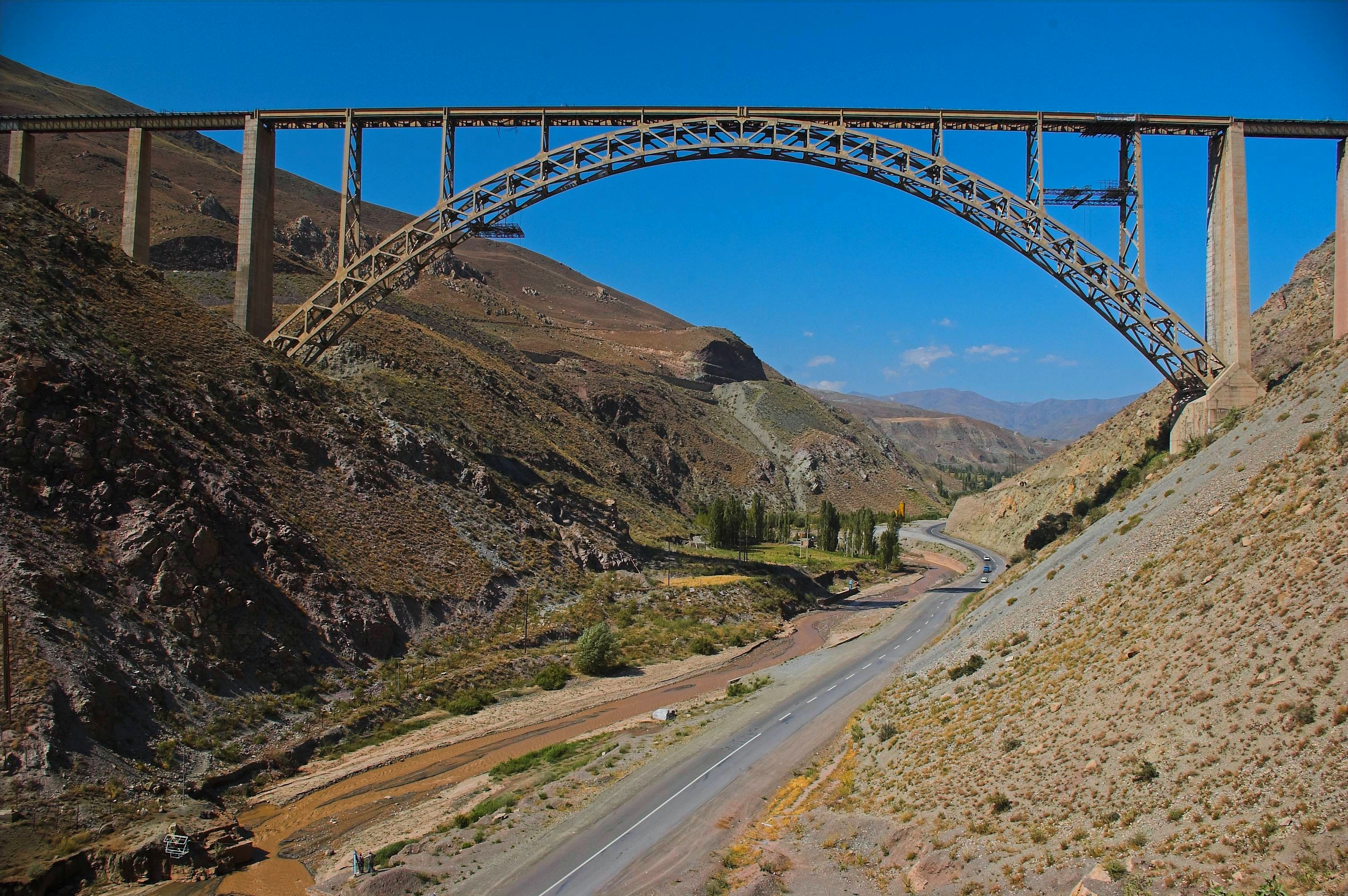
- Railway bridge over Qatur River

Location
- Country: Turkey, Iran

Physical characteristics
- Mouth: Aras
  - coordinates: 38.9942°N 45.4493°E

Basin features
- Progression: Aras→ Kura→ Caspian Sea

The Qotur (Azerbaijani: Qotur çay, Persian: قطورچای, Turkish: Kotur çayı, also transliterated as Ghotour) is a transboundary river flowing in eastern Turkey and northwestern Iran. It is a right tributary of the river Aras. It rises in the Saray District of eastern Turkey's Van province, where it is also referred to as Çaybağı Çayı. The Ghotour Bridge, part of the Van–Sufian railway, crosses the river near the city of Khoy.

The area has a cold, semi-arid climate (Köppen climate classification BSk).
