= Garrus, East Azerbaijan =

Village in East Azerbaijan province, Iran

Garrus Persian: گروس
- Village
- Location within Iran
- Coordinates: 38°18′20″N 46°01′57″E
- Country: Iran
- Province: East Azerbaijan
- County: Shabestar
- District: Sufian
- Rural District: Chelleh Khaneh

Population (2016)
  - Total: 2,002
- Time zone: UTC+3:30 (IRST)

Garrus (Persian: گروس) (Note: Also romanized as Garroos and Garrūs; also known as Gīrow, Gīrū, Karnow, Keruo, and Kerus) is a village in Chelleh Khaneh Rural District of Sufian District in Shabestar County, East Azerbaijan province, Iran.

== Demographics ==
=== Population ===
At the time of the 2006 National Census, the village's population was 1,737 in 481 households. The following census in 2011 counted 1,903 people in 538 households. The 2016 census measured the population of the village as 2,002 people in 582 households. It was the most populous village in its rural district.
