= Nazarlu =

City in East Azerbaijan province, Iran

Nazarlu Persian: نظرلو
- City
- Location within Iran
- Coordinates: 38°10′49″N 45°54′45″E
- Country: Iran
- Province: East Azerbaijan
- County: Shabestar
- District: Sufian
- Established as a city: 2024

Population (2016)
  - Total: 3,773
- Time zone: UTC+3:30 (IRST)

Nazarlu (Persian: نظرلو) (Note: Also romanized as Nazarloo and Naz̧arlū; also known as Nadar ‘Ali, Nadarlī, Nāder ‘Alī, and Nāderlī) is a city in Sufian District of Shabestar County, East Azerbaijan province, Iran.

== History ==
Nazarlu was developed and turned into a large and flourished village during the Qajar era. A large area and appropriate resources made it of great importance for Khans (lords and princes before the Pahlavi era who owned the farmlands in Iran), and sometimes several lords shared it simultaneously. According to an old document from Iran's National Library, four other villages in Marand were exchanged for Nazarlu by Haji Hoseinqoli Khan Nezam-o-Doleh Donbali, governor of Tabriz city at the time.

As is quoted from old residents of Nazarlu, there was a series of old houses and gardens around it during the Qajar era, which had become abandoned and called Kode lands. The old Nazarlu was limited to these lands, today's Motahari St. in the east and Seyedlar Alley in the north. This was so until a group from Tabriz came there in mid-1330 (Hijri Shamsi) and made Koda a prosperous land by digging wells that provided a water supply. After a few years, these lands were bought by Nazarlu's people and joined to it.

There were also two ancient cemeteries in Nazarlu, one in Pir Moosa lands next to today's medical center and another in the location of today's Shahid Madani Elementary School. In an astonishing story, it is said that in the latter one, bodies were buried over each other in the underground cellars.

Among historical remains from the Islamic era, there are two holy shrines called Emamzadeh in the west of Nazarlu, and almost nothing is known about their death time and burial. There is also another sacred shrine outside the village next to Nazarlu-Zinab way in Karamali lands, which once had a clay dom encircled it, but today it is under construction.

A few decades ago, there were two stone-made rams beside the Eamazadehs next to today's Medical center that traced back to Aq Qoyunlu and Qara Qoyunlular Dynasties. Ram is considered the symbol of power and authority among Turkish people, and similar sculptures can be found in their historical territory all over Iran and neighboring countries. Unfortunately, these stone arts were displaced and removed from the site in the 70th Hijri Shamsi as a matter of ignorance and theft. Outside of Nazarlu in the east, one can see the remains of an old mosque called Oba Mosque, which is believed to have belonged to the nomad people who lived nearby.

Some people of Nazarlu said to immigrated from two old villages, namely Sarabad and Kohneh Kand. According to rough estimations, both villages were totally abandoned around 1300 Hijri Shamsi and then destroyed. Sarabad was located in farmlands between Nazarlu and Zinab village, and Kohneh Kand (which today is the name of a water well) was to the south of Nazarlu. Interestingly, some people living in Khoy, an important city in West Azerbaijan province, associate themselves with Nazarlu and carry the name in their surnames. An old notebook from Qajar's last years of ruling, which belonged to Nozhat-O-Doleh (Wife of Haji Hosen QoliKhan Nezam-O-Doleh), indicates that her accountants and counselors kept a yearly record of taxes of a few of her properties including Nazarlu.

== Demographics ==
=== Population ===
At the time of the 2006 National Census, Nazarlu's population was 4,984 in 1,169 households, when it was a village in Mishu-e Jonubi Rural District. The following census in 2011 counted 4,405 people in 1,234 households. The 2016 census measured the population of the village as 3,773 people in 1,216 households. It was the most populous village in its rural district.

Nazarlu was converted to a city in 2024.

== Climate ==
Nazarlu has a Continental Mediterranean climate (Köppen: Csb), a variant of the Continental climate and Mediterranean climate.

== Culture ==
More than 80% of the population is educated and can speak both Azerbaijani and Farsi-the official language of the country. Most people believe in Islam, and the Islamic Holidays, especially Eid al-Fitr (ending of Holy Ramadan), Ghadir, and Eid al-Azha (Ghurban), are honored. The official calendar is the Shamsi Hijri calendar, so the first days of spring, called Yil-Bayrami or Nowruz Bayrami, are highly celebrated. Many traditions from the past are still alive in social and family relationships, marriage and Holidays. These traditions are rooted in the Azerbaijani-Turkish culture, which is widely shared in different areas of Azerbaijan.
