= Sar, East Azerbaijan =

Village in East Azerbaijan province, Iran

Sar Persian: سار
- Village
- Location within Iran
- Coordinates: 38°19′59″N 46°11′37″E
- Country: Iran
- Province: East Azerbaijan
- County: Shabestar
- District: Sufian
- Rural District: Rudqat

Population (2016)
  - Total: 1,311
- Time zone: UTC+3:30 (IRST)

Sar (Persian: سار) (Note: Also romanized as Sār; also known as Lār and Sāl) is a village in Rudqat Rural District of Sufian District in Shabestar County, East Azerbaijan province, Iran.

== Demographics ==
=== Population ===
At the time of the 2006 National Census, the village's population was 1,504 in 371 households. The following census in 2011 counted 1,309 people in 386 households. The 2016 census measured the population of the village as 1,311 people in 400 households.
