= Ammand, East Azerbaijan =

Village in East Azerbaijan province, Iran

Ammand Persian: امند
- Village
- Location within Iran
- Coordinates: 38°13′54″N 46°09′37″E
- Country: Iran
- Province: East Azerbaijan
- County: Shabestar
- District: Sufian
- Rural District: Rudqat

Population (2016)
  - Total: 1,664
- Time zone: UTC+3:30 (IRST)

Ammand (Persian: امند) (Note: Also romanized as Amand, Ammend, and Emmend) is a village in, and the capital of, Rudqat Rural District in Sufian District of Shabestar County, East Azerbaijan province, Iran.

== Demographics ==
=== Population ===
At the time of the 2006 National Census, the village's population was 2,282 in 605 households. The following census in 2011 counted 1,910 people in 619 households. The 2016 census measured the population of the village as 1,664 people in 577 households. It was the most populous village in its rural district.
