= Van railway station =

Railway station in Van, Turkey

VAN
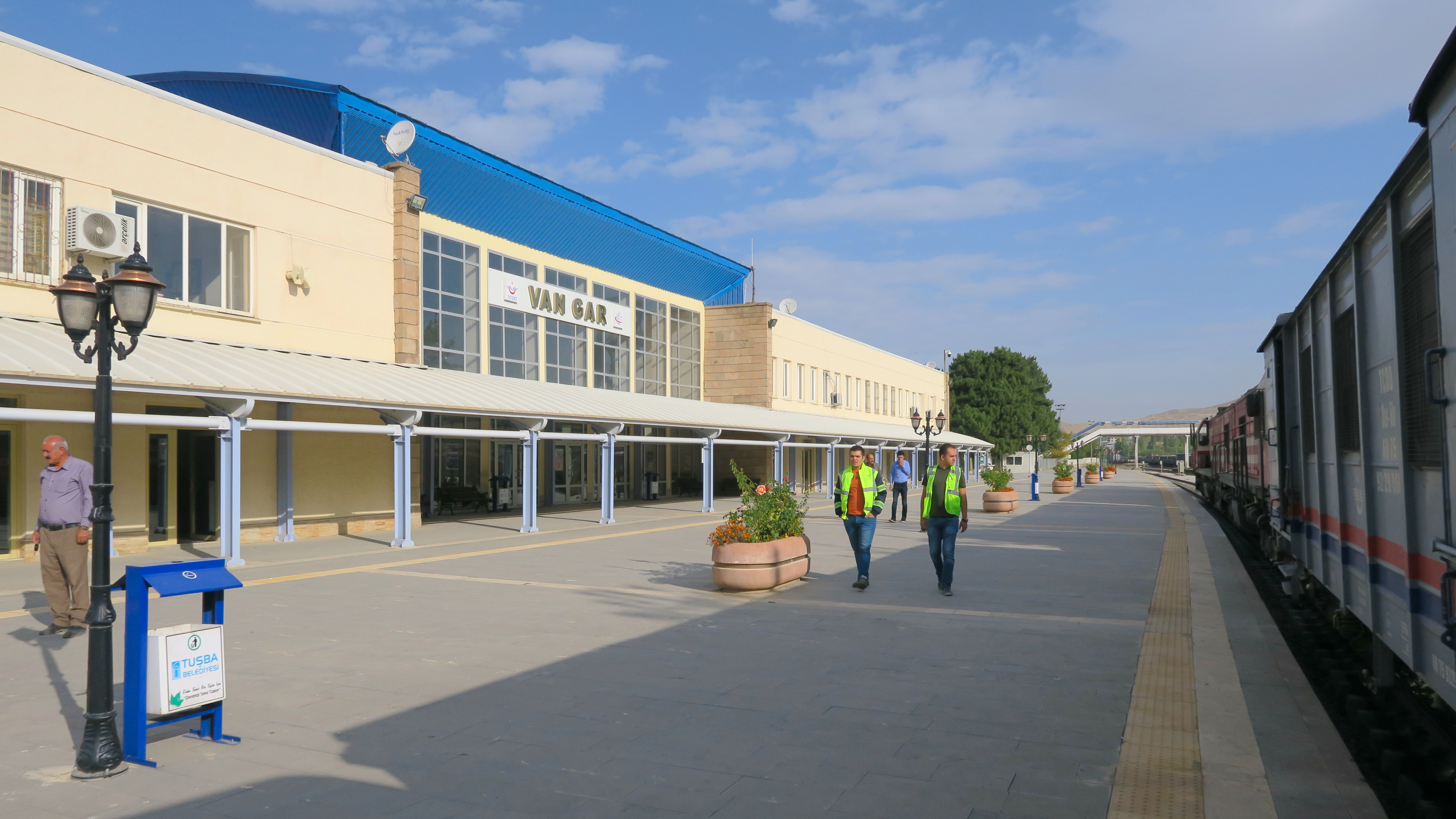
- The station in 2018, following the resumption of passenger service

General information
- Location: İstasyon Cd., İstasyon Mah., 65100; Van Merkez/Van; Turkey
- Coordinates: 38.5216769°N 43.3831631°E
- Owner: Turkish State Railways
- Operator: TCDD Taşımacılık
- Line: Van-Kapıköy railway
- Platforms: 1 side platform
- Tracks: 7

Construction
- Structure type: At-grade
- Parking: In front of station building

History
- Opened: 1971

Services
Preceding station	TCDD Taşımacılık	Following station
Van Pier Terminus	Trans-Asia Express Service suspended	Çeken towards Tehran
Location

Van railway station (Turkish: Van garı) is the main railway station in Van, Turkey. Up until July 2015, the Trans-Asia Express, from Tehran, Iran, stopped at the station. The train would continue to the Van Pier, where passengers would travel to Tatvan via ferry, and the western half of the train would continue to Ankara. As of mid-2015, freight trains are the only rail traffic at the station. However, as of September 2018, a twice weekly service to Tabriz is due to resume.

Van station was opened in 1971 by the Turkish State Railways.

== Images ==
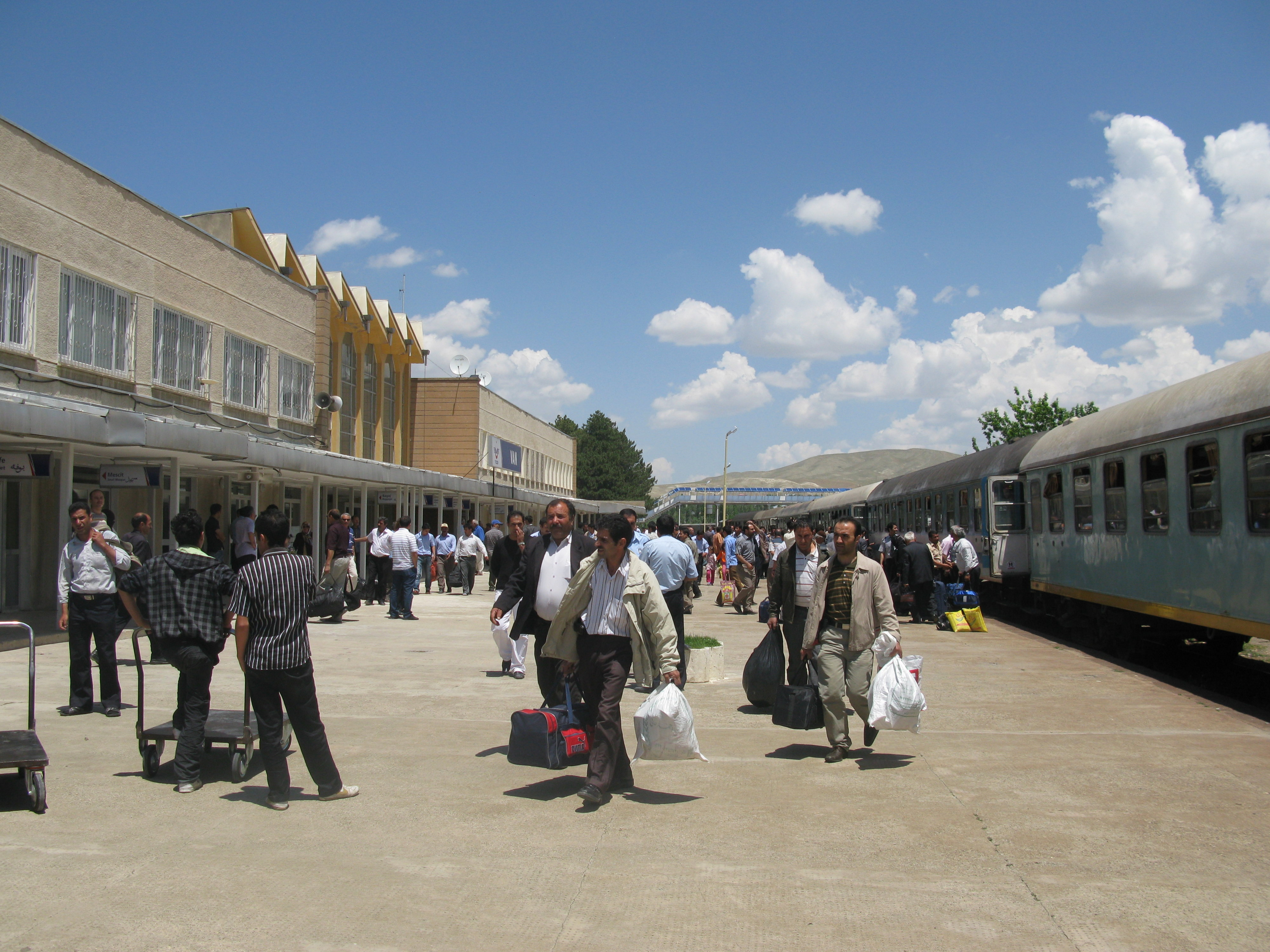
Passengers debark a train

== See also ==
- Edirne railway station - Opened in the same year, with the near-identical station buildings.
