= Qom Tappeh, Shabestar =

Village in East Azerbaijan province, Iran

Qom Tappeh Persian: قم تپه
- Village
- Location within Iran
- Coordinates: 38°13′01″N 46°00′51″E
- Country: Iran
- Province: East Azerbaijan
- County: Shabestar
- District: Sufian
- Rural District: Chelleh Khaneh

Population (2016)
  - Total: 768
- Time zone: UTC+3:30 (IRST)

Qom Tappeh (Persian: قم تپه) (Note: Also known as Ghom Tappeh, Kum Tapa, Kum Tepe, Oom Tappeh, Qūm Tapeh, and Qūm Tappeh (قوم تپه)) is a village in Chelleh Khaneh Rural District of Sufian District in Shabestar County, East Azerbaijan province, Iran.

== Demographics ==
=== Population ===
At the time of the 2006 National Census, the village's population was 622 in 153 households. The following census in 2011 counted 730 people in 179 households. The 2016 census measured the population of the village as 768 people in 230 households.
