= Chelleh Khaneh-ye Olya =

Village in East Azerbaijan province, Iran

Chelleh Khaneh-ye Olya Persian: چله خانه عليا
- Village
- Location within Iran
- Coordinates: 38°15′21″N 46°01′34″E
- Country: Iran
- Province: East Azerbaijan
- County: Shabestar
- District: Sufian
- Rural District: Chelleh Khaneh

Population (2016)
  - Total: 1,983
- Time zone: UTC+3:30 (IRST)

Chelleh Khaneh-ye Olya (Persian: چله خانه عليا) (Note: Also Romanized as Chelleh Khāneh-ye ‘Olyā and Chelleh Khāneh ‘Olyā; also known as Chelleh Khāneh Bālā, Chelleh Khāneh-ye Bālā, Chelleh Khāneh Yūkhārī, Chilakhāna Yukāri, Chilakhana-Yukhari, and Yūkhārī Chellehkhāneh) is a village in, and the capital of, Chelleh Khaneh Rural District in Sufian District of Shabestar County, East Azerbaijan province, Iran.

== Demographics ==
=== Population ===
At the time of the 2006 National Census, the village's population was 1,736 in 485 households. The following census in 2011 counted 2,161 people in 635 households. The 2016 census measured the population of the village as 1,983 people in 616 households.
