= Tatvan District =

District of Bitlis Province, Turkey

- District
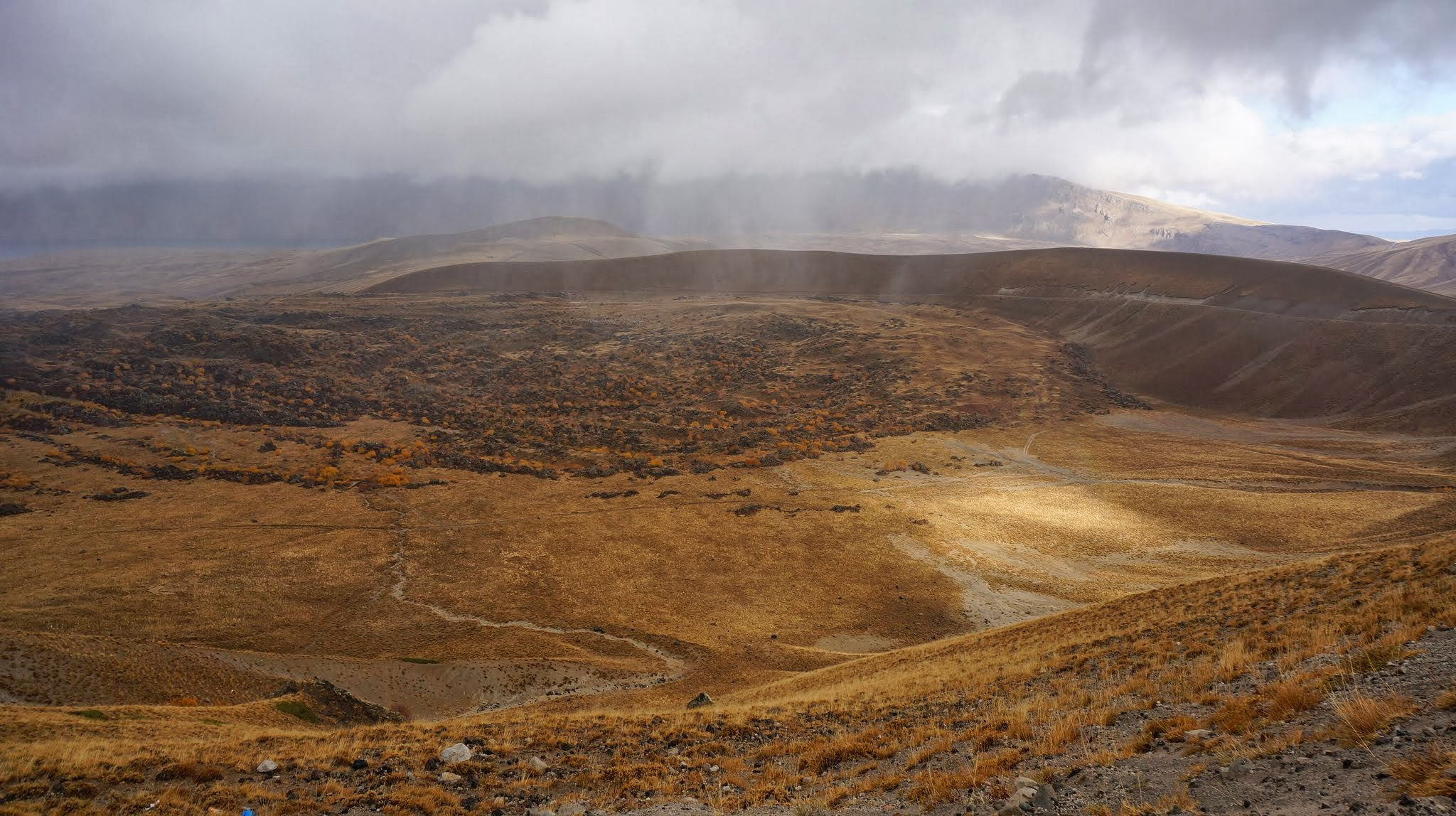
- Countryside near Yumurtatepe, Tatvan

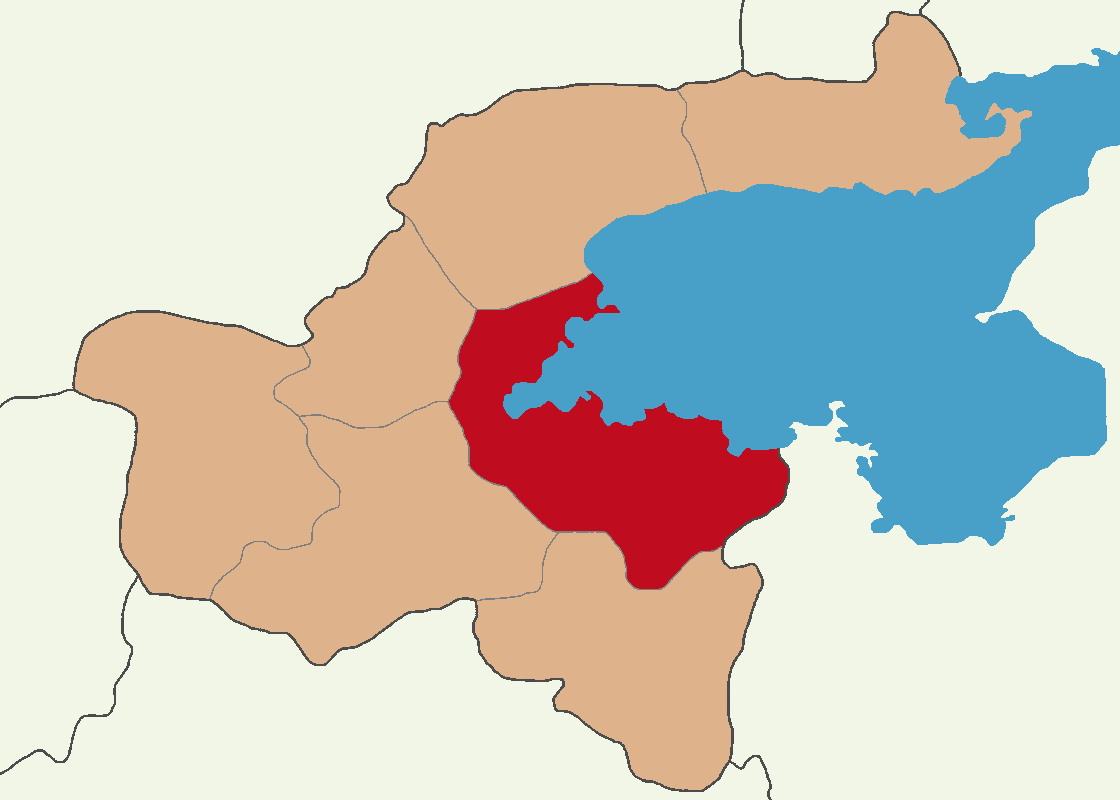
- Map showing Tatvan District in Bitlis Province

- Location within Turkey
- Coordinates: 38°30′N 42°17′E
- Country: Turkey
- Province: Bitlis
- Seat: Tatvan

Government
  - Kaymakam: Remzi Demir
- Area: 1,885 km^{2} (728 sq mi)
- Population (2021): 96,884
  - Density: 51.40/km^{2} (133.1/sq mi)
- Time zone: UTC+3 (TRT)
- Website: www.tatvan.gov.tr

Tatvan District is a district of Bitlis Province of Turkey. Its seat is the city of Tatvan. Its area is 1,885 km^{2}, and its population is 96,884 (2021).

== Composition ==
There is one municipality in Tatvan District:

- Tatvan

There are 57 villages in Tatvan District:

- Adabağ
- Alacabük
- Anadere
- Benekli
- Bolalan
- Budaklı
- Çalıdüzü
- Çanakdüzü
- Çavuşlar
- Çekmece
- Çevreköy
- Dağdibi
- Dalda
- Dibekli
- Dönertaş
- Düzcealan
- Eğritaş
- Göllü
- Güntepe
- Güreşçi
- Hanelmalı
- Harmanlı
- Kağanlı
- Kaynarca
- Kırkbulak
- Kısıklı
- Kıyıdüzü
- Koruklu
- Koyluca
- Koyunpınarı
- Köprücük
- Kuruyaka
- Kuşluca
- Küçüksu
- Nohutlu
- Obuz
- Odabaşı
- Oruçlu
- Örenlik
- Sallıca
- Sarıdal
- Sarıkum
- Söğütlü
- Suboyu
- Teknecik
- Tokaçlı
- Topraklı
- Tosunlu
- Ulusoy
- Uncular
- Uslu
- Yassıca
- Yediveren
- Yelkenli
- Yoncabaşı
- Yumrukaya
- Yumurtatepe
