= Andabil, East Azerbaijan =

Village in East Azerbaijan province, Iran

Andabil Persian: اندبيل
- Village
- Location within Iran
- Coordinates: 38°21′28″N 45°59′32″E
- Country: Iran
- Province: East Azerbaijan
- County: Shabestar
- District: Sufian
- Rural District: Chelleh Khaneh

Population (2016)
  - Total: 402
- Time zone: UTC+3:30 (IRST)

Andabil (Persian: اندبيل) (Note: Also romanized as Andabīl; also known as Andehbīl and Yandabil’) is a village in Chelleh Khaneh Rural District of Sufian District in Shabestar County, East Azerbaijan province, Iran.

== Demographics ==
=== Population ===
At the time of the 2006 National Census, the village's population was 739 in 206 households. The following census in 2011 counted 576 people in 189 households. The 2016 census measured the population of the village as 402 people in 136 households.
