= Cheraghlu, Varzaqan =

Cheraghlu چراغلو
- Village
- Location within Iran
- Coordinates: 38°26′26″N 46°36′33″E
- Country: Iran
- Province: East Azerbaijan
- County: Varzaqan
- Bakhsh: Central
- Rural District: Ozomdel-e Jonubi

Population (2006)
  - Total: 104
- Time zone: UTC+3:30 (IRST)
  - Summer (DST): UTC+4:30 (IRDT)

Cheraghlu (Persian: چراغلو, also Romanized as Cherāghlū; also known as Chanaglu, Charaglu, and Cherāqlū) is a village in Ozomdel-e Jonubi Rural District, in the Central District of Varzaqan County, East Azerbaijan Province, Iran. At the 2006 census, its population was 104, in 22 families.
