= Ghotour Bridge =

Railway bridge in Iran

Coordinates: 38.478056°N 44.768611°E

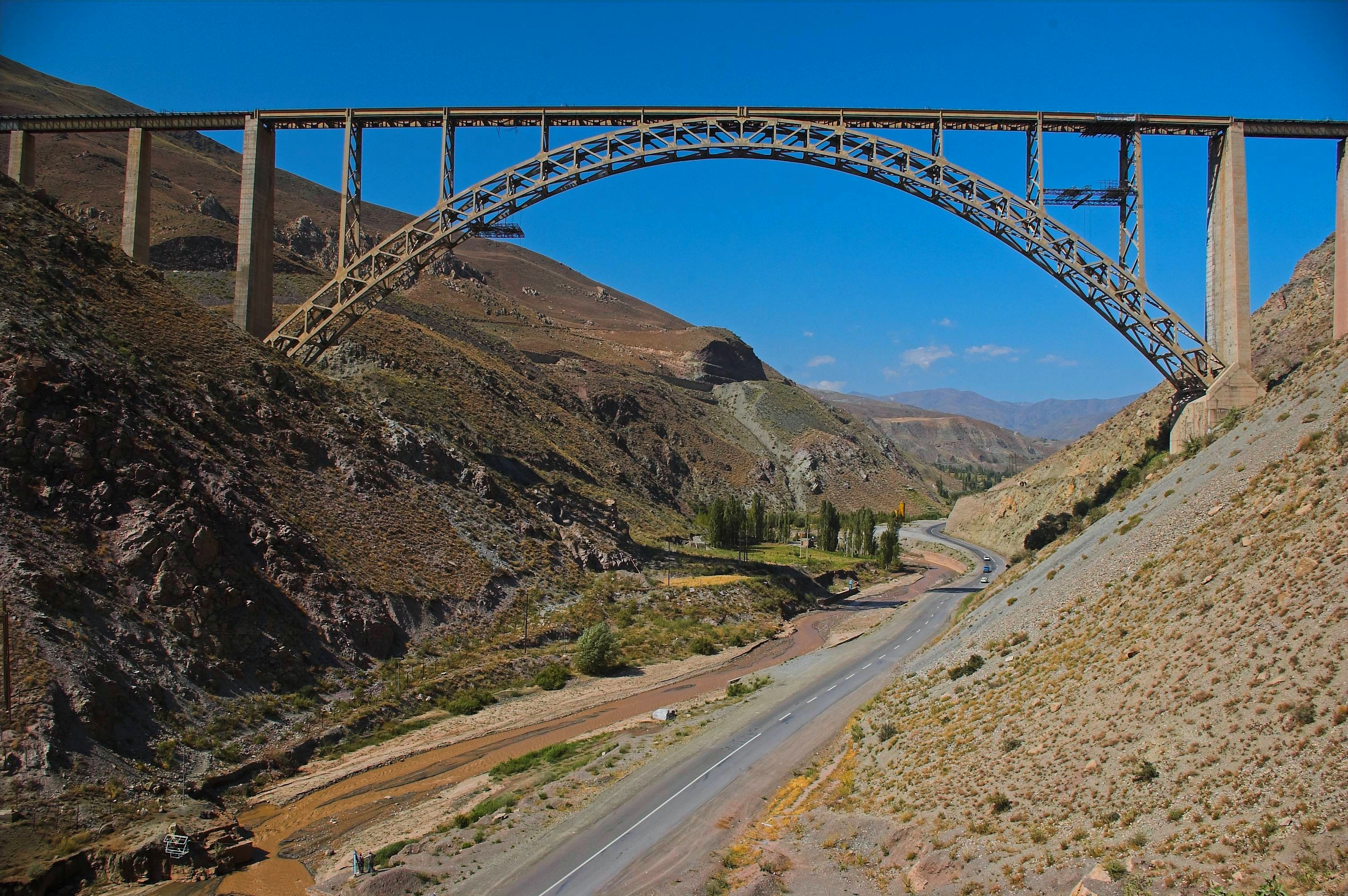

Ghotour Bridge (Persian: پل هوایی خوی) is a railway bridge in Khoy County, West Azerbaijan Province, Iran, over the river Ghotour. It is an arch bridge, and was completed in 1970. It has a length of 442.9 m (1453 ft.) with the largest span being 223.1 m (732 ft.). The bridge is part of the Van–Sufian railway track connecting eastern Turkey and western Iran.

During the Iran-Iraq war, Iraq launched nine airstrikes and six bombings of the bridge.
