= Chelleh Khaneh, Sarab =

Chelleh Khaneh چله خانه
- Village
- Location within Iran
- Coordinates: 38°02′14″N 47°41′35″E
- Country: Iran
- Province: East Azerbaijan
- County: Sarab
- Bakhsh: Central
- Rural District: Aghmiyun

Population (2006)
  - Total: 93
- Time zone: UTC+3:30 (IRST)
  - Summer (DST): UTC+4:30 (IRDT)

Chelleh Khaneh (Persian: چله خانه, also Romanized as Chelleh Khāneh) is a village in Aghmiyun Rural District, in the Central District of Sarab County, East Azerbaijan Province, Iran. At the 2006 census, its population was 93, in 14 families.
