= Qom Tappeh, Maragheh =

Qom Tappeh قم تپه
- Village
- Location within Iran
- Coordinates: 37°06′39″N 46°37′37″E
- Country: Iran
- Province: East Azerbaijan
- County: Maragheh
- Bakhsh: Saraju
- Rural District: Quri Chay-ye Gharbi

Population (2006)
  - Total: 190
- Time zone: UTC+3:30 (IRST)
  - Summer (DST): UTC+4:30 (IRDT)

Qom Tappeh (Persian: قم تپه) is a village in Quri Chay-ye Gharbi Rural District, Saraju District, Maragheh County, East Azerbaijan Province, Iran. At the 2006 census, its population was 190, in 40 families.
