= Persian mysticism =

Cosmology, philosophy and theology of historical Persia and contemporary Iran

Persian mysticism, or Iranian mysticism, is a traditional mystical interpretation of existence, life and love, reliant upon revelatory and heart-felt principles in reasoning. Though partially sourced from mystical traditions rooted in ancient Iranian religion and Zoroastrianism, in its contemporary practical aspects it is now synonymous with Sufism in contemporary Iran.

== Thought ==
Persian mystical thought has been analysed critically by Abdolhossein Zarrinkoub, Abdolkarim Soroush, and Dariush Shayegan. In Rumi, one can find love-based mysticism; in Hafiz the pleasure-based mysticism. Under Rumi's influences, Abdolkarim Soroush is currently working on power-based or epic mysticism.

== Medieval Persian mystics ==
- Sadr al-Din al-Qunawi
- Rumi
- Hafez
- Farid al-Din Attar
- Saadi Shirazi
- Baba Tahir
- Najmeddin Kubra
- Qutb al-Din al-Shirazi
- Shams Tabrizi
- Bayazid Bastami
- Abul-Hassan Kharaqani
- Shahab al-Din Suhrawardi
- Mansur Al-Hallaj
- Omar Khayyám
- Jami
- Sanai

== Modern art and the Persian mystical tradition ==
Persian mysticism has a significant impact on Iranian modern art.

== See also ==
- Ibn 'Arabi
- Persian poetry
- Persian traditional music
- Persianate society
