= Sufian =

City in East Azerbaijan province, Iran

Sufian Persian: صوفیان
- City
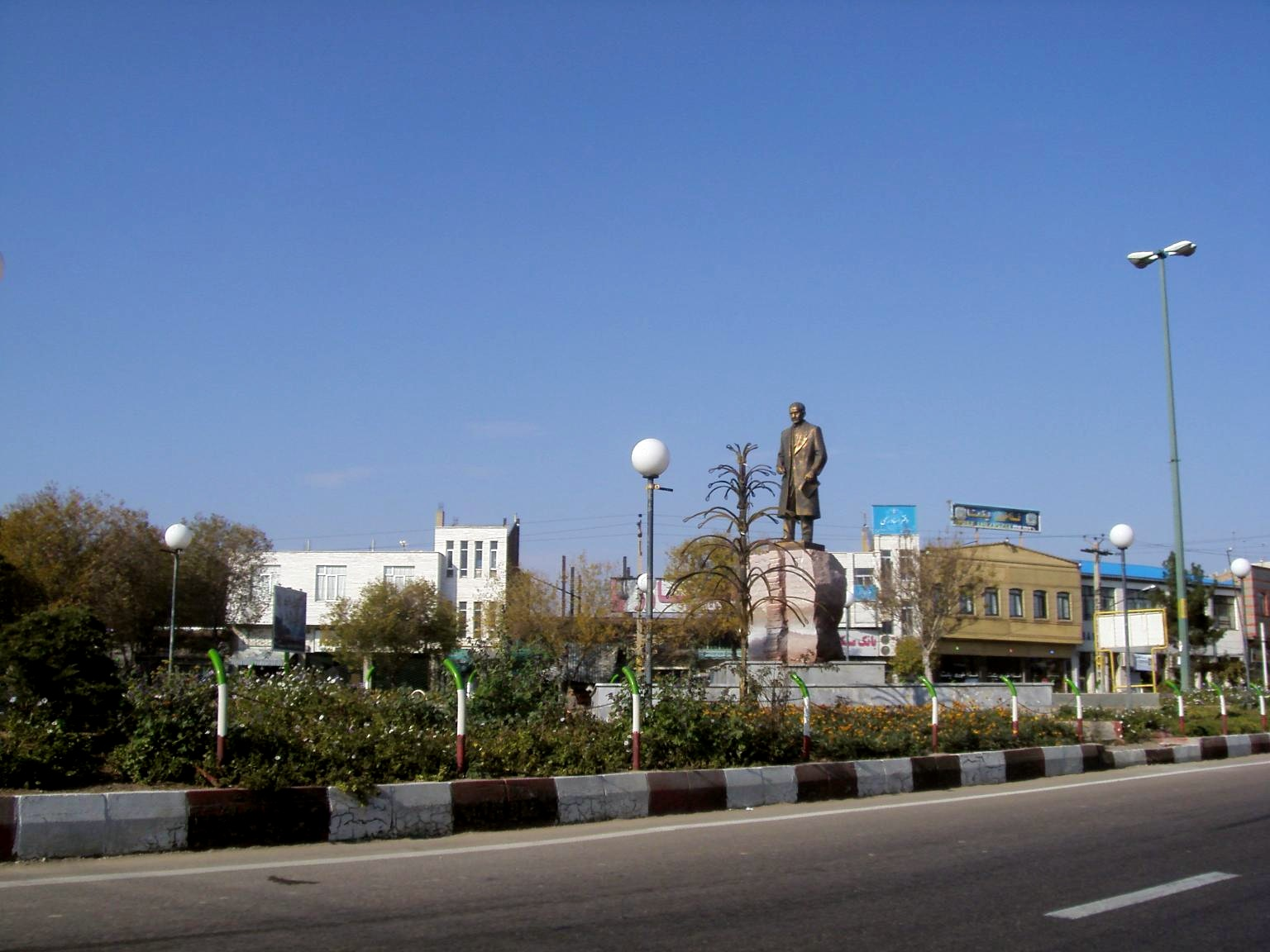

- Location within Iran
- Coordinates: 38°16′39″N 45°58′51″E
- Country: Iran
- Province: East Azerbaijan
- County: Shabestar
- District: Sufian

Population (2016)
  - Total: 9,963
- Time zone: UTC+3:30 (IRST)

Sufian (Persian: صوفیان) (Note: Also romanized as Soofiyan, Şowfyān, Sufiyan, Şufīyān, and Sūfīyān) is a city in, and the capital of, Sufian District of Shabestar County, East Azerbaijan province, Iran.

== Demographics ==
=== Population ===
At the time of the 2006 National Census, the city's population was 8,733 in 2,427 households. The following census in 2011 counted 9,126 people in 2,830 households. The 2016 census measured the population of the city as 9,963 people in 3,273 households.

== Overview ==
There is a major cement factory operated by the Sufiyan Cement Company to the southeast of the city. The city has at least five mosques, four of them in close proximity to the city center.
