= Mishu-e Jonubi Rural District =

Rural district in East Azerbaijan province, Iran

Mishu-e Jonubi Rural District Persian: دهستان ميشو جنوبي
- Rural District
- Location within Iran
- Coordinates: 38°13′N 45°54′E
- Country: Iran
- Province: East Azerbaijan
- County: Shabestar
- District: Sufian
- Capital: Nematollah

Population (2016)
  - Total: 8,648
- Time zone: UTC+3:30 (IRST)

Mishu-e Jonubi Rural District (Persian: دهستان ميشو جنوبي) is in Sufian District of Shabestar County, East Azerbaijan province, Iran. Its capital is the village of Nematollah.

== Demographics ==
=== Population ===
At the time of the 2006 National Census, the rural district's population was 10,276 in 2,621 households. There were 8,563 inhabitants in 2,503 households at the following census of 2011. The 2016 census measured the population of the rural district as 8,648 in 2,881 households. The most populous of its 10 villages was Nazarlu (now a city), with 3,773 people.

=== Other villages in the rural district ===
- Ali Akbarlu
- Bagh-e Vazir
- Golabad
- Kond Rud
- Sarkand-e Dizaj
