= Tatvan =

- Municipality
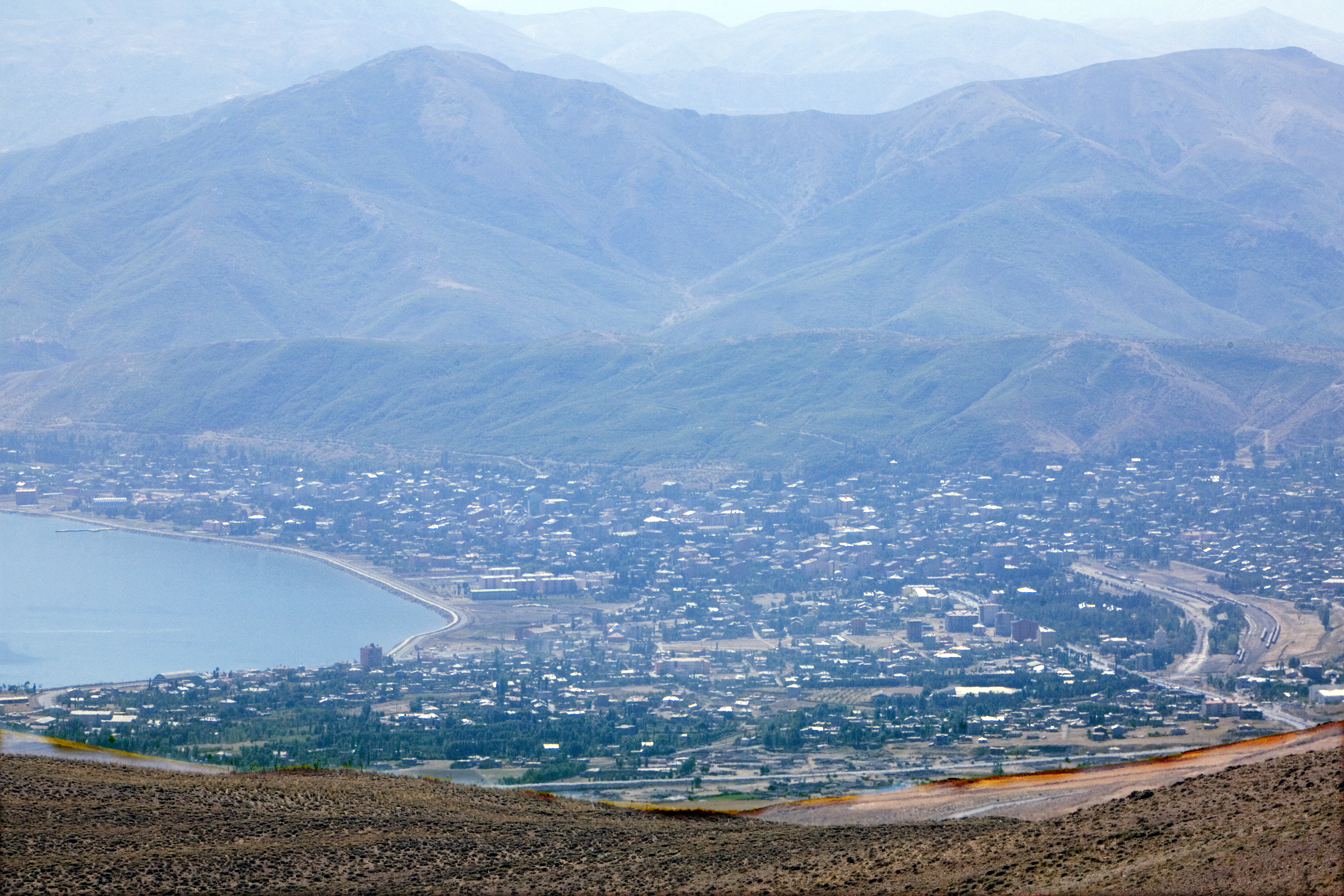
- Overview of Tatvan from the volcano Nemrut

- Logo

- Location within Turkey
- Coordinates: 38°30′08″N 42°16′53″E
- Country: Turkey
- Province: Bitlis
- District: Tatvan

Government
  - Mayor: Mümin Erol (DEM Party)
- Elevation: 1,690 m (5,540 ft)
- Population (2021): 79,214
- Time zone: UTC+3 (TRT)
- Postal code: 13200
- Website: tatvan.bel.tr

Tatvan (Kurdish: Tetwan; Armenian: Դատվան, romanized: Datvan) is a city on the western shore of Lake Van, in Bitlis Province in eastern Turkey. It is the seat of Tatvan District. Its population is 79,214 (2021), making it the most populated municipality of the province. The current mayor is Mümin Erol (DEM Party).

The town is populated by Kurds of the Bekiran tribe.

== History ==
The citadel of Eski Tatvan possibly dates back to the Urartian period. It was used at least until the 17th century. Sayf al-Dawla, the Arab Hamdanid emir of Aleppo, visited Tatvan in 939/40. While he was there, he received the submission of the Armenian prince Ashot III of Taron. The town was historically an important place on the route from Van to Bitlis. By the 20th century, though, Tatvan had dwindled to a mere village, little more than "a cluster of houses by a jetty". It only developed back into a town when transport links improved around mid-century, with the construction of the railway in the 1950s and the improvement of the road to Van in 1964. In the 1980s, T.A. Sinclair wrote that the Denizcilik Bankası (Shipping Company) ran a good hotel on the south side of town, which was often full. The other hotels at the time, he wrote, were in the town centre and were not good.

== Transport ==
The Tatvan Pier railway station is the eastern terminus of the railway line between Ankara and Teheran, with freight and passenger trains. It is connected eastwards to Van, 100 km away, and westwards to the rest of Turkey, by State Road D300. There is also a train ferry across the lake Van. The ferry was upgraded in 2015.

There is no railway around the lake to Van. The intention is to build one but to date there are no plans. This would actually create an unbroken rail link between Europe and the Indian subcontinent, as Van is effectively the western terminus of the Iranian railway network.

There is a bus station about 500 meters from the train station.

== Climate ==
Climate data for Tatvan
Month	Jan	Feb	Mar	Apr	May	Jun	Jul	Aug	Sep	Oct	Nov	Dec	Year
Mean daily maximum °C (°F)	5.78 (42.40)	7.72 (45.90)	11.18 (52.12)	14.65 (58.37)	18.52 (65.34)	25.07 (77.13)	29.75 (85.55)	29.55 (85.19)	23.85 (74.93)	16.47 (61.65)	5.22 (41.40)	2.35 (36.23)	15.84 (60.52)
Daily mean °C (°F)	0.33 (32.59)	1.97 (35.55)	5.2 (41.4)	9.68 (49.42)	13.27 (55.89)	18.27 (64.89)	22.68 (72.82)	22.52 (72.54)	17.4 (63.3)	11.37 (52.47)	6.18 (43.12)	2.18 (35.92)	10.92 (51.66)
Mean daily minimum °C (°F)	−4.52 (23.86)	−6.15 (20.93)	−0.8 (30.6)	4.68 (40.42)	8.0 (46.4)	11.45 (52.61)	15.72 (60.30)	14.6 (58.3)	10.32 (50.58)	5.22 (41.40)	2.35 (36.23)	−3.1 (26.4)	4.81 (40.67)
Average precipitation mm (inches)	85.22 (3.36)	60.12 (2.37)	93.20 (3.67)	90.42 (3.56)	74.22 (2.92)	11.15 (0.44)	4.58 (0.18)	4.73 (0.19)	9.58 (0.38)	87.28 (3.44)	48.75 (1.92)	81.66 (3.21)	650.91 (25.64)
Source: Meteomanz (2000-2002, 2013-2016)

== See also ==
- Turkish State Railways
- Islamic Republic of Iran Railways
