= Saray, Van =

Saray
- District and municipality
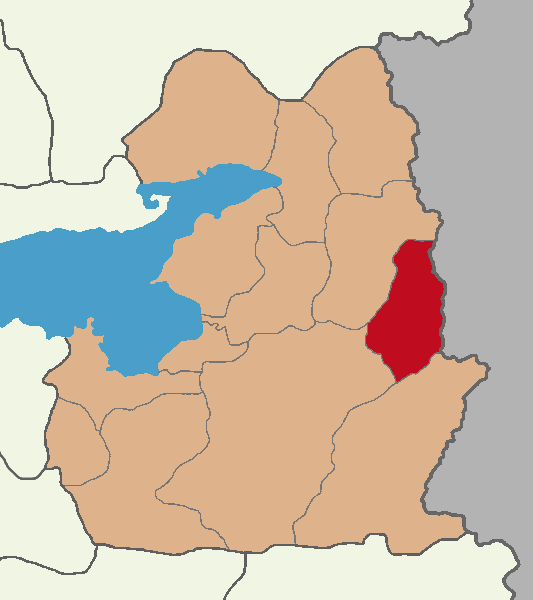
- Map showing Saray District in Van Province

- Location in Turkey
- Coordinates: 38°39′02″N 44°10′12″E
- Country: Turkey
- Province: Van
- Area: 872 km^{2} (337 sq mi)
- Population (2022): 19,471
  - Density: 22.3/km^{2} (57.8/sq mi)
- Time zone: UTC+3 (TRT)
- Postal code: 65830
- Area code: 0432
- Website: www.vansaray.bel.tr

Saray (Kurdish: Sêrê) is a municipality and district of Van Province, Turkey. Its area is 872 km^{2}, and its population is 19,471 (2022). The mayor elected in 2019 was Caziye Duman from the Peoples' Democratic Party (HDP). She was arrested along with 14 others, many of them from the HDP, on terrorism charges in November 2019 and replaced by a trustee. Security officials accused them of having "been engaged in activities within the terrorist organization's women's field structure."

An earthquake in February 2020 shook the region and many villages of the Saray district reported damage.

== Composition ==
There are 27 neighbourhoods in Saray District:

- Atatürk
- Bakışık
- Baltepe
- Beyarslan
- Çakmakköy
- Çardak
- Çaybağı
- Değirmigöl
- Dolutaş
- Feritmelen
- Kapıköy
- Karahisar
- Kargalı
- Kazımpaşa
- Kazlıgöl
- Keçikayası
- Kekikdüzü
- Kepir
- Koçbaşı
- Kurucan
- Mahmudiye
- Örenburç
- Sırımlı
- Turanköy
- Yamanyurt
- Yeşilağaç
- Zincirkıran
