= Chelleh Khaneh Rural District =

Rural district in East Azerbaijan province, Iran

Chelleh Khaneh Rural District Persian: دهستان چله خانه
- Rural District
- Location within Iran
- Coordinates: 38°15′N 46°02′E
- Country: Iran
- Province: East Azerbaijan
- County: Shabestar
- District: Sufian
- Established: 1987
- Capital: Chelleh Khaneh-ye Olya

Population (2016)
  - Total: 7,877
- Time zone: UTC+3:30 (IRST)

Chelleh Khaneh Rural District (Persian: دهستان چله خانه) is in Sufian District of Shabestar County, East Azerbaijan province, Iran. Its capital is the village of Chelleh Khaneh-ye Olya.

== Demographics ==
=== Population ===
At the time of the 2006 National Census, the rural district's population was 7,921 in 2,056 households. There were 7,630 inhabitants in 2,215 households at the following census of 2011. The 2016 census measured the population of the rural district as 7,877 in 2,447 households. The most populous of its 12 villages was Garrus, with 2,002 people.

=== Other villages in the rural district ===
- Andabil
- Khvajeh Marjan
- Qom Tappeh
- Tazeh Kand
