= Transasia Express =

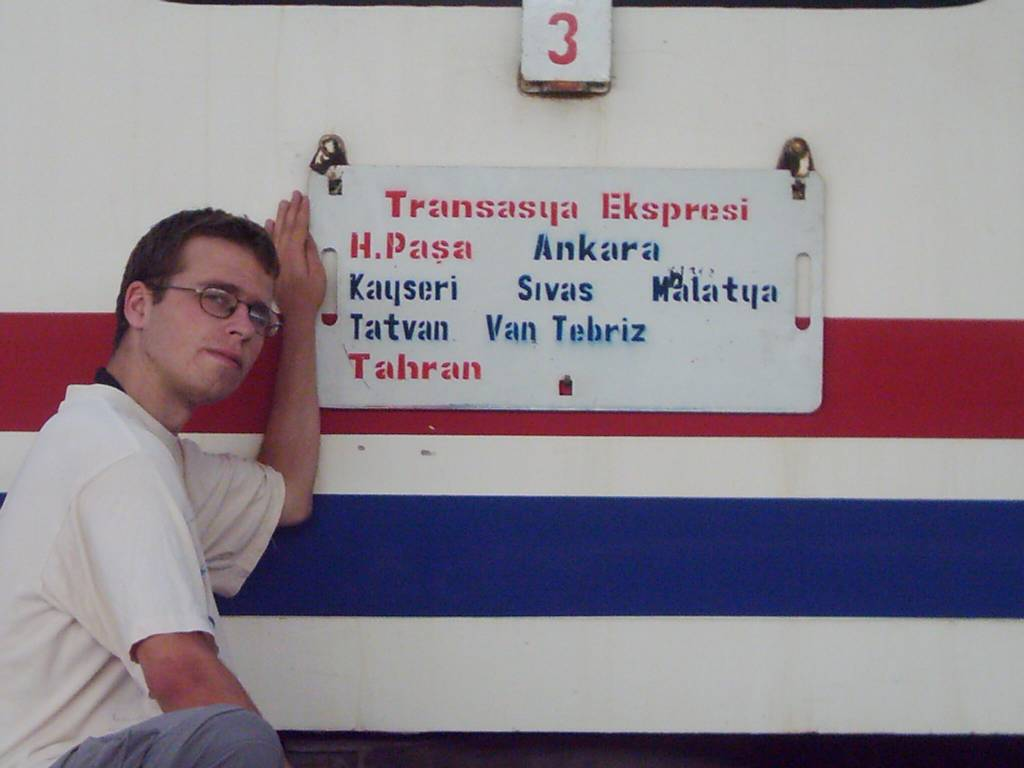
- Destinations of the route

Overview
- Other name: Trans-Asian Epress
- Native name: Transasya Ekspresi
- Status: Ceased operation
- Stations: 11

Service
- Type: Transcontinental railroad Regional rail Freight rail
- Services: 2
- Operator: TCDD Transport

History
- Opened: 1971
- Closed: 2015

Technical
- Line length: 2394 km (Ankara-Tehran); 2968 km (Istanbul-Tehran) excl. 90 km of Lake Van
- Track gauge: 1,435 mm (4 ft 8 1/2 in)

Transasia Express or Trans-Asian Express (Turkish: Transasya Ekspresi) is an historic international railway line between Istanbul and Tehran. This service links Turkey and Iran via the Lake Van ferry crossing.

It was first introduced in 1971 and continued until 1979, before being discontinued because of the Iranian Revolution. It was reintroduced in 2001 but was later starting from Ankara rather than Istanbul and remained in service until its suspension in August 2015 due to security concerns arising from terrorist activities. Four years later, in August 2019, it started again but shortly after was suspended again in February 2020 because of the Covid-19 pandemic.

In March 2025, the Van-Tehran section of the railway line returned to service but no longer under the name of Transasia Express and trains depart solely from Van and have no ferry connection across Lake Van to the rest of the line.

== Route ==
The route begins in Ankara and passes through Kayseri, Sivas, Malatya, and Elazığ before reaching Tatvan. From Tatvan, the route continues by ferry across Lake Van to Van. From Van, the route crosses the Iranian border at Razi and passes through Salmas, Tabriz, and Zanjan to reach Tehran.

Due to the highly rugged terrain south of Lake Van, which made the construction of a railway difficult and following around the northern shore required a considerably longer route, it was decided to establish a train ferry service across the lake.

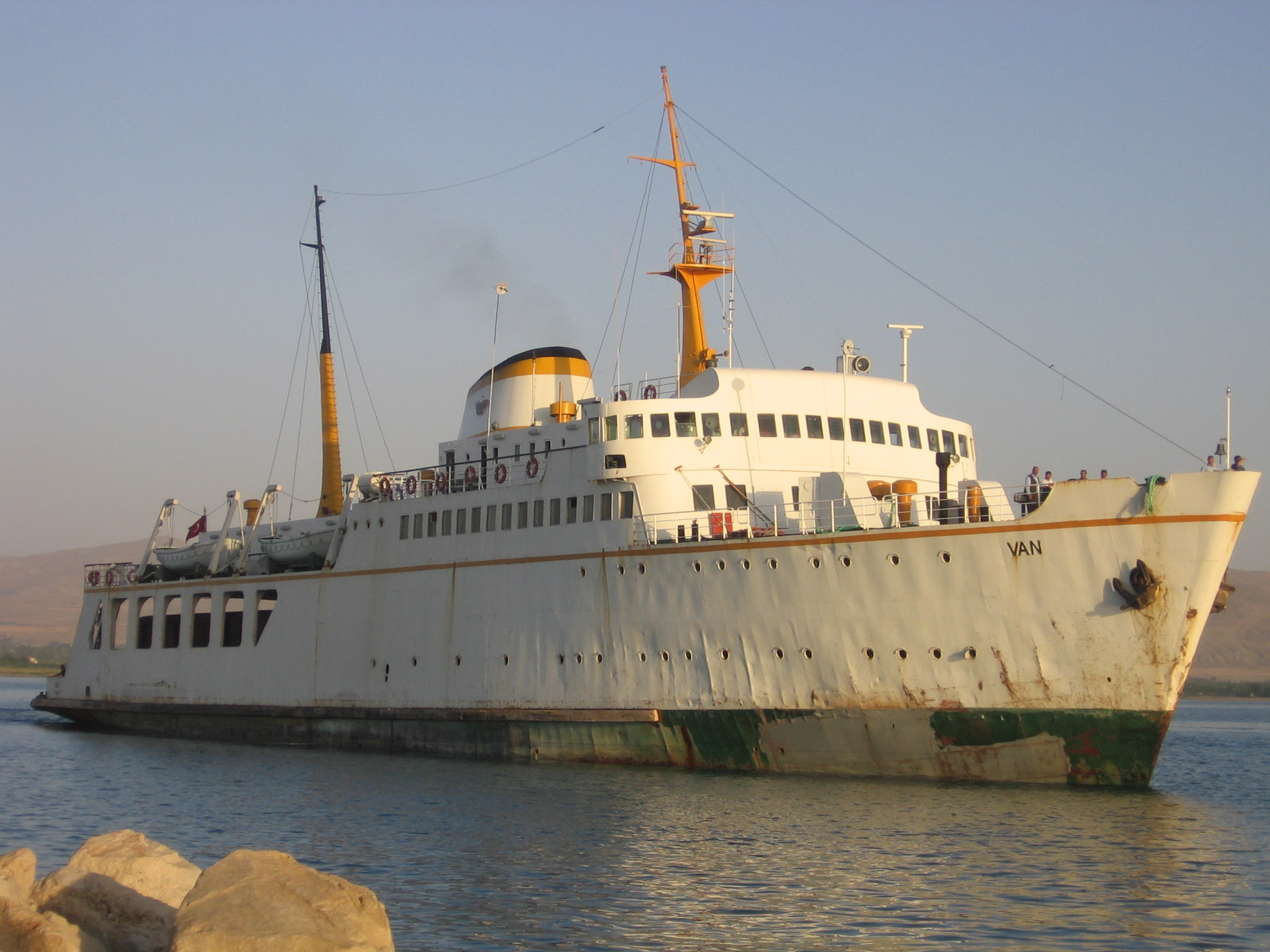
Train ferry that passes across Lake Van

== See also ==
- Turkish State Railways
- IRI Railways
- Trans-Asian Railway
