= Rudqat Rural District =

Rural district in East Azerbaijan province, Iran

Rudqat Rural District Persian: دهستان رودقات
- Rural District
- Location within Iran
- Coordinates: 38°20′N 46°12′E
- Country: Iran
- Province: East Azerbaijan
- County: Shabestar
- District: Sufian
- Established: 1987
- Capital: Ammand

Population (2016)
  - Total: 11,158
- Time zone: UTC+3:30 (IRST)

Rudqat Rural District (Persian: دهستان رودقات) is in Sufian District of Shabestar County, East Azerbaijan province, Iran. Its capital is the village of Ammand.

== Demographics ==
=== Population ===
At the time of the 2006 National Census, the rural district's population was 11,837 in 2,939 households. There were 10,916 inhabitants in 3,150 households at the following census of 2011. The 2016 census measured the population of the rural district as 11,158 in 3,482 households. The most populous of its 20 villages was Ammand, with 1,664 people.

=== Other villages in the rural district ===
- Ivand
- Kalankash
- Mazraeh
- Sar
- Torp
- Zeynabad
