= Sufian District =

District in East Azerbaijan province, Iran

Sufian District Persian: بخش صوفیان
- District
- Location within Iran
- Coordinates: 38°18′N 46°04′E
- Country: Iran
- Province: East Azerbaijan
- County: Shabestar
- Established: 1990
- Capital: Sufian

Population (2016)
  - Total: 37,646
- Time zone: UTC+3:30 (IRST)

Sufian District (Persian: بخش صوفیان) is in Shabestar County, East Azerbaijan province, Iran. Its capital is the city of Sufian.

== History ==
The village of Nazarlu was converted to a city in 2024.

== Demographics ==
=== Population ===
At the time of the 2006 National Census, the district's population was 38,767 in 10,043 households. The following census in 2011 counted 36,235 people in 10,698 households. The 2016 census measured the population of the district as 37,646 inhabitants in 12,083 households.

=== Administrative divisions ===
Sufian District Population
Administrative Divisions	2006	2011	2016
Chelleh Khaneh RD	7,921	7,630	7,877
Mishu-e Jonubi RD	10,276	8,563	8,648
Rudqat RD	11,837	10,916	11,158
Nazarlu (city) (Note: Became a city after the 2016 census)			
Sufian (city)	8,733	9,126	9,963
Total	38,767	36,235	37,646
RD = Rural District
