= Topchi =

Topchi may refer to:

- Topchi or Tupchi, Afghanistan, a village in Bamyan Province of Afghanistan
- Topchi or Tupchi, Iran, a village in East Azerbaijan Province, Iran
- Topchi or Topçu, Ismailli, Topchu, and Torchu, a village and municipality in the Ismailli Rayon of Azerbaijan

== See also ==
- Topçu (disambiguation)
