= Topçu =

Topçu may refer to:

- Topçu (corps), the artillery corps of the Ottoman army in the 15th–19th centuries
- Topçu (name)
- Topçu, Bayramören
- Topçu, Ismailli, a village and municipality in the Ismailli Rayon of Azerbaijan
- Topçu, Köprüköy
- Topçu, Tarsus, a village in the Tarsus district of Mersin Province, Turkey

== See also ==
- Topchi (disambiguation)
