= Amestejan =

Amestejan امستجان
- Village
- Location within Iran
- Coordinates: 38°21′29″N 45°19′18″E
- Country: Iran
- Province: East Azerbaijan
- County: Shabestar
- Bakhsh: Tasuj
- Rural District: Chehregan

Population (2006)
  - Total: 368
- Time zone: UTC+3:30 (IRST)
  - Summer (DST): UTC+4:30 (IRDT)

Amestejan (Persian: امستجان, also Romanized as Amestejān, Amastjan, and Amestajān; also known as Anestavān and Anistavan) is a village in Chehregan Rural District, Tasuj District, Shabestar County, East Azerbaijan Province, Iran. At the 2006 census, its population was 368, in 118 families.
