= Yakaboyu =

Yakaboyu is a Turkish place name and may refer to the following places in Turkey:

- Yakaboyu, İnebolu
- Yakaboyu, Hafik
