= Alijani =

Alijani is a Persian surname and may refer to:

- Reza Alijani, Iranian journalist, writer and nationalist-religious activist
- B. Alijani, Iranian meteorologist
- Neda Alijani, Iranian infectious disease physician
- Mohammad Alidjani-Momer, Iranian sports shooter
- Mohsen Alijani-Zamani, Iranian physician and reformist politician
