= Akgüney =

Akgüney can refer to:

- Akgüney, Bayramören
- Akgüney, İnebolu
- Akgüney, İspir
