= Qızılca =

Qızılca or Kyzyldzha or Kizildzha may refer to:

== Azerbaijan ==
- Qızılca, Goygol, Azerbaijan
- Qızılca, Lachin, Azerbaijan
- Qızılca, Nakhchivan, Azerbaijan

== Iran ==
- Kyzyldzha, Shabestar, East Azerbaijan Province
