= Tupchi =

Tupchi or Toopchi (Persian: توپچي) may refer to:

- Tupchi, Afghanistan
- Tupchi, Iran
- Tupchi, Khuzestan, Iran
