= Göçkün =

Göçkün can refer to the following villages in Turkey:

- Göçkün, Amasra
- Göçkün, İnebolu
