= Taşburun =

Taşburun may refer to:

- Taşburun, Karakoyunlu
- Taşburun, Bayburt
- Taşburun, İnebolu
- Taşburun, Narman

== See also ==
- Barun Das (disambiguation)
