= Haft Cheshmeh, Shabestar =

Village in East Azerbaijan province, Iran

Haft Cheshmeh Persian: هفت چشمه
- Village
- Location within Iran
- Coordinates: 38°11′20″N 45°27′58″E
- Country: Iran
- Province: East Azerbaijan
- County: Shabestar
- District: Tasuj
- Rural District: Guney-ye Gharbi

Population (2016)
  - Total: 624
- Time zone: UTC+3:30 (IRST)

Haft Cheshmeh (Persian: هفت چشمه) (Note: Also romanized as Haft Chashmeh; also known as Gāv Cheshmeh, Gavtachashmeh, Gavtacheshma, and Haft Cheshmehé Anzab) is a village in Guney-ye Gharbi Rural District of Tasuj District (Note: Formerly Anzab District) in Shabestar County, East Azerbaijan province, Iran.

== Demographics ==
=== Population ===
At the time of the 2006 National Census, the village's population was 450 in 126 households. The following census in 2011 counted 413 people in 132 households. The 2016 census measured the population of the village as 624 people in 198 households.
