= Boğazkaya =

Boğazkaya can refer to:

- Boğazkaya, Bayramören
- Boğazkaya, Haymana
- Boğazkaya, Kahta
- Boğazkaya, Mecitözü
