= Akçay =

Akçay (literally "white stream" in Turkish) may refer to the following places:

- Akçay, Bismil
- Akçay, Edremit, a municipality in the district of Edremit, Balıkesir Province, Turkey
- Akçay, Elmalı, a village in the district of Elmalı, Antalya Province, Turkey
- Akçay, İnebolu, a village in the district of İnebolu, Kastamonu Province, Turkey
- Akçay, Güzelyurt, a village in the district of Güzelyurt, northern Cyprus
