= Sakalar =

Sakalar can refer to the following villages in Turkey:

- Sakalar, Artvin
- Sakalar, İnebolu
