= Heris, Shabestar =

Village in East Azerbaijan province, Iran

Heris Persian: هريس
- Village
- Location within Iran
- Coordinates: 38°15′32″N 45°32′02″E
- Country: Iran
- Province: East Azerbaijan
- County: Shabestar
- District: Tasuj
- Rural District: Guney-ye Gharbi

Population (2016)
  - Total: 840
- Time zone: UTC+3:30 (IRST)

Heris (Persian: هريس) (Note: Also romanized as Herīs; also known as Herīz and Teryz) is a village in Guney-ye Gharbi Rural District of Tasuj District (Note: Formerly Anzab District) in Shabestar County, East Azerbaijan province, Iran.

== Demographics ==
=== Population ===
At the time of the 2006 National Census, the village's population was 1,110 in 342 households. The following census in 2011 counted 942 people in 331 households. The 2016 census measured the population of the village as 840 people in 330 households.
