= Ghelman Saray =

Village in East Azerbaijan province, Iran

Ghelman Saray Persian: غلمانسراي
- Village
- Location within Iran
- Coordinates: 38°18′13″N 45°07′01″E
- Country: Iran
- Province: East Azerbaijan
- County: Shabestar
- District: Tasuj
- Rural District: Chehregan

Population (2016)
  - Total: 524
- Time zone: UTC+3:30 (IRST)

Ghelman Saray (Persian: غلمانسراي) (Note: Also romanized as Ghelmān Sarāy and Ghelmānsarāy; also known as ‘Alam Sarāy, Alma Sarāi, Ālmā Sarāy, Almy Saray, Qelmānsarāy, and Qolmān Sarā) is a village in Chehregan Rural District of Tasuj District (Note: Formerly Anzab District) in Shabestar County, East Azerbaijan province, Iran.

== Demographics ==
=== Population ===
At the time of the 2006 National Census, the village's population was 608 in 164 households. The following census in 2011 counted 549 people in 176 households. The 2016 census measured the population of the village as 524 people in 157 households.
