= İkizler =

İkizler can refer to:

- İkizler, İnebolu
- İkizler, Tercan
