= Dolaşlar, Bayramören =

Village in Turkey

Dolaşlar
- Village
- Location in Turkey Dolaşlar (Turkey Central Anatolia)
- Coordinates: 40°57′N 33°10′E
- Country: Turkey
- Province: Çankırı
- District: Bayramören
- Elevation: 861 m (2,825 ft)
- Population (2021): 109
- Time zone: UTC+3 (TRT)

Dolaşlar is a village in the Bayramören District of Çankırı Province in Turkey. Its population is 109 (2021). It is situated 3 km west of Bayramören municipality.
