= Almas, East Azerbaijan =

Village in East Azerbaijan province, Iran

Almas Persian: الماس
- Village
- Location within Iran
- Coordinates: 38°20′04″N 45°25′56″E
- Country: Iran
- Province: East Azerbaijan
- County: Shabestar
- District: Tasuj
- Rural District: Guney-ye Gharbi

Population (2016)
  - Total: 360
- Time zone: UTC+3:30 (IRST)

Almas (Persian: الماس) (Note: Also romanized as Ālmās and Almās; also known as Almāsī and Almaz) is a village in Guney-ye Gharbi Rural District of Tasuj District (Note: Formerly Anzab District) in Shabestar County, East Azerbaijan province, Iran.

== Demographics ==
=== Population ===
At the time of the 2006 National Census, the village's population was 326 in 108 households. The following census in 2011 counted 377 people in 116 households. The 2016 census measured the population of the village as 360 people in 126 households.
