= Yukarıköy =

Yukarıköy can refer to:

- Yukarıköy, Ayvacık
- Yukarıköy, İnebolu
