= Til, East Azerbaijan =

Village in East Azerbaijan province, Iran

Til Persian: تيل
- Village
- Location within Iran
- Coordinates: 38°14′51″N 45°27′38″E
- Country: Iran
- Province: East Azerbaijan
- County: Shabestar
- District: Tasuj
- Rural District: Guney-ye Gharbi

Population (2016)
  - Total: 3,303
- Time zone: UTC+3:30 (IRST)

Til (Persian: تيل) (Note: Also romanized as Tīl) is a village in, and the capital of, Guney-ye Gharbi Rural District in Tasuj District (Note: Formerly Anzab District) of Shabestar County, East Azerbaijan province, Iran.

== Demographics ==
=== Population ===
At the time of the 2006 National Census, the village's population was 2,642 in 817 households. The following census in 2011 counted 2,547 people in 835 households. The 2016 census measured the population of the village as 3,303 people in 1,109 households. It was the most populous village in its rural district.
