= Yeşilöz, İnebolu =

Village in Turkey

Yeşilöz
- Neighbourhood
- Location in Turkey
- Coordinates: 41.957°N 33.761°E
- Country: Turkey
- Province: Kastamonu
- District: İnebolu
- Municipality: İnebolu
- Population (2021): 361
- Time zone: UTC+3 (TRT)

Yeşilöz is a neighbourhood of the town İnebolu, İnebolu District, Kastamonu Province, Turkey. Its population is 361 (2021).
