= Alexander of Abonoteichus =

Greek mystic and oracle (c. 105 – c. 170)

Alexander
- Born: c. 105; Abonoteichus (modern-day İnebolu, Kastamonu, Turkey)
- Died: c. 170
- Occupation: oracle of Aesculapius
- Known for: false oracle

Alexander of Abonoteichus (Ancient Greek: Ἀλέξανδρος ὁ Ἀβωνοτειχίτης Aléxandros ho Abōnoteichítēs), also called Alexander the Paphlagonian (c. 105 – c. 170 CE), was a Greek mystic and oracle, and the founder of the Glycon cult that briefly achieved wide popularity in the Roman world. The contemporary writer Lucian reports that he was an utter fraud – the god Glycon was supposedly made up of a live snake with an artificial head. The vivid narrative of his career given by Lucian might be taken as fictitious but for the corroboration of certain coins of the emperors Lucius Verus and Marcus Aurelius and of a statue of Alexander, said by Athenagoras to have stood in the forum of Parium. There is further evidence from inscriptions.

Lucian describes him as having swindled many people and engaged, through his followers, in various forms of thuggery. The strength of Lucian's venom against Alexander is attributed to Alexander's hate of the Epicureans. Lucian admired the works of Epicurus, a eulogy for which concludes the piece, and whether or not Alexander was the master of fraud and deceit as portrayed by Lucian, he may not have been too different from other oracles of the age, when a great deal of dishonest exploitation occurred in some shrines.

== Biography ==
Not much is known about the early life of Alexander. According to Lucian's account, he was of lowly Paphlagonian origin, and it is implicit he was from Abonoteichos itself or the surrounding Pontic area. As a youth, Lucian says Alexander worked as a male prostitute, until he entered a romantic and commercial relation with one of his clients, a magician who boasted to be a disciple of Apollonius of Tyana. Alexander then accompanied his lover in his travels and learned his craft; Lucian observes that, despite being a charlatan, Alexander's master had actually taught him some pharmaceutical lore, which in the future would be helpful as a means to gain credibility. After the death of his lover, lacking in means to provide for himself, since he was already too old to gain money from prostitution (it's understood he was in his late teens), Alexander went to Byzantium, where he formed a society with one Cocconas, who's described as a poet (poetry was an integral part of incantatory practices in Classical Antiquity). Alexander and Cocconas, after some time working as travelling magicians, decided to establish a new oracle in Alexander's hometown Abonoteichus (femin.: Ἀβωνότειχος Abōnóteichos; later Ionopolis), on the Euxine, where he gained riches and great prestige by professing to heal the sick and reveal the future.

Sometime before 160 CE Alexander formed a cult around the worship of a new snake-god, Glycon, and headquartered it in Abonoteichus. Having circulated a prophecy that the son of Apollo was to be born again, he contrived that there should be found in the foundations of the temple to Aesculapius, then in course of construction at Abonoteichus, an egg in which a small live snake had been placed. In an age of superstition no people had so great a reputation for credulity as the Paphlagonians, and Alexander had little difficulty in convincing them of the second coming of the god under the name of Glycon. A large tame snake with a false human head, wound round Alexander's body as he sat in a shrine in the temple, gave "autophones", or oracles unasked. The numerous questions asked of the oracle were answered by Alexander in metrical predictions. In his most prosperous year he is said to have delivered nearly 80,000 replies, concerning bodily, mental, and social afflictions, for each of which he received a drachma and two oboli.

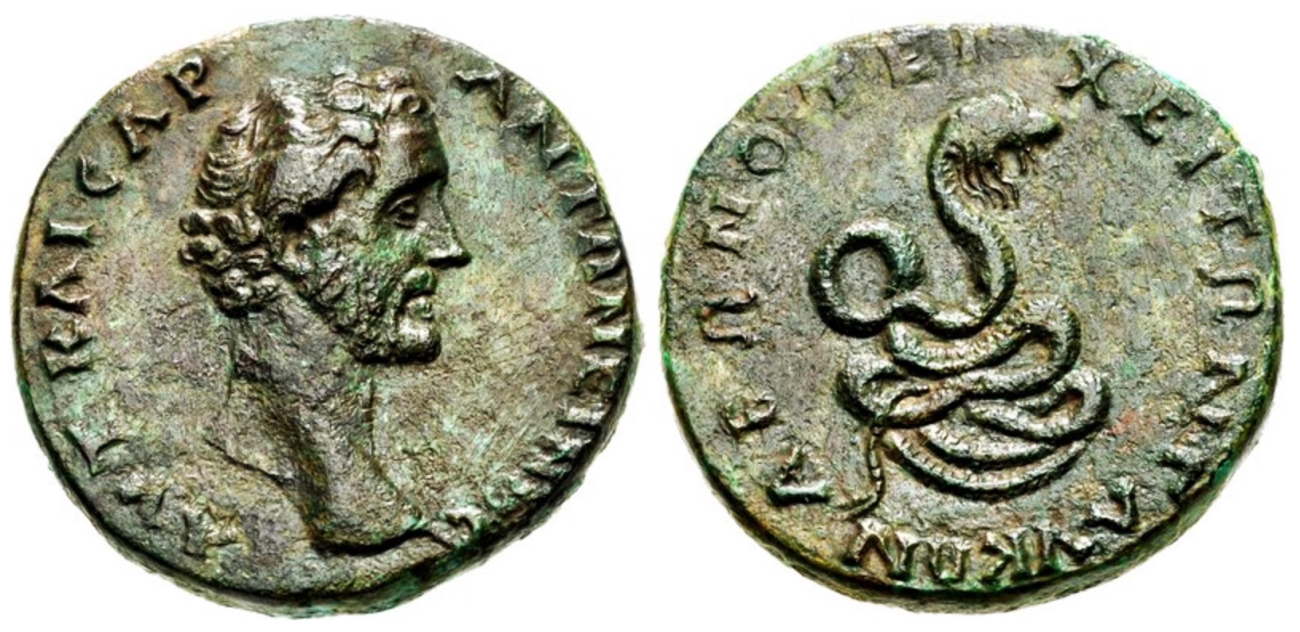
Bronze coin of Antoninus Pius minted in Abonoteichos and showing the snake god Glycon with the legend “ΓΛVΚΩΝ ΑΒΩΝΟΤΕΙΧΕΙΤΩΝ” (29 mm, 16.89 g)

Healing instructions were commonly combined with oracles, but Alexander did more; he instituted mysteries like those of Eleusis. Through the cult Alexander achieved a certain level of political influence – his daughter married Publius Mummius Sisenna Rutilianus, the governor of the Roman province of Asia. He found believers from Pontus to Rome through pretended arts of soothsaying and magic and was revered and consulted as a prophet by many notable individuals of his age. During the plague of 166 a verse from the oracle was used as an amulet and was inscribed over the doors of houses as a protection and an oracle was sent, at Marcus Aurelius' request, by Alexander to the Roman army on the Danube during the war with the Marcomanni, declaring that victory would follow on the throwing of two lions alive into the river. The result was a great disaster and Alexander had recourse to the old quibble of the Delphic oracle to Croesus for an explanation.

His main opponents were Epicureans and Christians. Lucian's account of Alexander represents the Christians—along with the Epicureans—as the special enemies and as the principal objects of his hate: Epicureans had too little religion or superstition to give in to a religious pretender; and the Christian faith was too deep-rooted to dream of any communion with Alexander.

Lucian's own close investigations into Alexander's methods of fraud led to a serious attempt on his life. The whole account gives a graphic description of the inner working of one among the many new oracles that were springing up at this period. Alexander had remarkable beauty and the striking personality of the successful charlatan, and must have been a man of considerable intellectual abilities and power of organization. His usual methods were those of the numerous oracle-mongers of the time, of which Lucian gives a detailed account: the opening of sealed inquiries by heated needles, a neat plan of forging broken seals, and the giving of vague or meaningless replies to difficult questions, coupled with a lucrative blackmailing of those whose inquiries were compromising.

Alexander died of gangrene of the leg complicated by myiasis in his seventieth year.

== Modern scholarship ==
Scholars have described Alexander as an oracle who perpetrated a hoax to deceive gullible citizens, or as a false prophet and charlatan who played on the hopes of simple people. He was said to have "made predictions, discovered fugitive slaves, detected thieves and robbers, caused treasures to be dug up, healed the sick, and in some cases actually raised the dead". Sociologist Stephen A. Kent, in a study of the text, compares Lucian's Alexander to the "malignant narcissist" in modern psychiatric theory, and suggests that the "behaviors" described by Lucian "have parallels with several modern cult leaders." Ian Freckelton has noted at least a surface similarity between Alexander and David Berg, the leader of a contemporary religious group, the Children of God.

Occultist Alan Moore in his book The Moon and Serpent Bumper Book of Magic details and discusses Alexander at length, in his book he expresses a deal of doubt about Lucian's account and states that he considers Alexander to be the most important figure in the Western Occult Tradition in all of history.

== Sources ==
- Life of Alexander of Abonoteichos by Lucian, translated by A. M. Harmon (1936) for the [Loeb Classical Library] edition of Lucian's works.
- Works by Lucian of Samosata at Project Gutenberg
- Lendering, Jona, Glycon
