= Yazıören =

Yazıören may refer to:

- Yazıören, Bayramören
- Yazıören, Bolu
- Yazıören, Tercan
