= Göynükören =

Göynükören can refer to:

- Göynükören, Bayramören
- Göynükören, Devrekani, a village in Turkey
- Göynükören, Gerede, a village in Turkey
