= Qezeljeh, Shabestar =

Qezeljeh قزلجه
- Village
- Location within Iran
- Coordinates: 38°19′16″N 45°09′34″E
- Country: Iran
- Province: East Azerbaijan
- County: Shabestar
- Bakhsh: Tasuj
- Rural District: Chehregan

Population (2006)
  - Total: 231
- Time zone: UTC+3:30 (IRST)
  - Summer (DST): UTC+4:30 (IRDT)

Qezeljeh (Persian: قزلجه, also known as Kyzyldzha, Qizilia, and Qizilja) is a village in Chehregan Rural District, Tasuj District, Shabestar County, East Azerbaijan Province, Iran. At the 2006 census, its population was 231, in 62 families.
