= Sheykh Vali =

Village in East Azerbaijan province, Iran

Sheykh Vali Persian: شيخ ولي
- Village
- Location within Iran
- Coordinates: 38°13′46″N 45°24′42″E
- Country: Iran
- Province: East Azerbaijan
- County: Shabestar
- District: Tasuj
- Rural District: Guney-ye Gharbi

Population (2016)
  - Total: 786
- Time zone: UTC+3:30 (IRST)

Sheykh Vali (Persian: شيخ ولي) (Note: Also romanized as Shaikhwali, Sheikh Vali, Sheykh Valī, and Shikhvali) is a village in Guney-ye Gharbi Rural District of Tasuj District (Note: Formerly Anzab District) in Shabestar County, East Azerbaijan province, Iran.

== Demographics ==
=== Population ===
At the time of the 2006 National Census, the village's population was 763 in 193 households. The following census in 2011 counted 740 people in 211 households. The 2016 census measured the population of the village as 786 people in 261 households.
