= Üçevler =

Üçevler can refer to:

- Üçevler, Bitlis, a village in Bitlis Turkey
- Üçevler, İnebolu, a village in İnebolu, Turkey
- Üçevler, Kızıltepe, a village inn Kızıltepe, Turkey
- Üçevler Sports Facility, multi-purpose sports venue in Nilüfer District of Bursa Turkey
