= Musaköy, İnebolu =

Village in Turkey

Musaköy
- Neighbourhood
- Location in Turkey
- Coordinates: 41.960°N 33.745°E
- Country: Turkey
- Province: Kastamonu
- District: İnebolu
- Municipality: İnebolu
- Population (2021): 468
- Time zone: UTC+3 (TRT)

Musaköy is a neighbourhood of the town İnebolu, İnebolu District, Kastamonu Province, Turkey. Its population is 468 (2021).
