= Heydarabad, Tasuj =

Village in East Azerbaijan province, Iran

Heydarabad Persian: حيدراباد
- Village
- Location within Iran
- Coordinates: 38°16′33″N 45°25′36″E
- Country: Iran
- Province: East Azerbaijan
- County: Shabestar
- District: Tasuj
- Rural District: Guney-ye Gharbi

Population (2016)
  - Total: 578
- Time zone: UTC+3:30 (IRST)

Heydarabad (Persian: حيدراباد) (Note: Also romanized as Ḩeydarābād; also known as Geydarābād, Haidarābād, Haiderabad, and Ḩedarābād) is a village in Guney-ye Gharbi Rural District of Tasuj District (Note: Formerly Anzab District) in Shabestar County, East Azerbaijan province, Iran.

== Demographics ==
=== Population ===
At the time of the 2006 National Census, the village's population was 537 in 157 households. The following census in 2011 counted 513 people in 165 households. The 2016 census measured the population of the village as 578 people in 188 households.
