= Şirvanmeşə =

Village in Azerbaijan

Coordinates: 40°53′N 48°04′E

Şirvanmeşə is a village in the municipality of Topçu in the Ismailli Rayon of Azerbaijan.
