= Yukarıçaylı =

Yukarıçaylı can refer to the following villages in Turkey:

- Yukarıçaylı, İnebolu
- Yukarıçaylı, Yenipazar
