= Qaleh-ye Maraghush =

Village in East Azerbaijan province, Iran

Qaleh-ye Maraghush Persian: قلعه مراغوش
- Village
- Location within Iran
- Coordinates: 38°17′00″N 45°20′04″E
- Country: Iran
- Province: East Azerbaijan
- County: Shabestar
- District: Tasuj
- Rural District: Guney-ye Gharbi

Population (2016)
  - Total: 214
- Time zone: UTC+3:30 (IRST)

Qaleh-ye Maraghush (Persian: قلعه مراغوش) (Note: Also romanized as Qal‘eh Marāghūsh, Qal‘eh-ye Marāghūsh, and Qal‘ehmarāghūsh) is a village in Guney-ye Gharbi Rural District of Tasuj District (Note: Formerly Anzab District) in Shabestar County, East Azerbaijan province, Iran.

== Demographics ==
=== Population ===
At the time of the 2006 National Census, the village's population was 271 in 56 households. The following census in 2011 counted 306 people in 69 households. The 2016 census measured the population of the village as 214 people in 64 households.
