= Çamlıca, İnebolu =

Village in Turkey

Çamlıca
- Neighbourhood
- Location in Turkey
- Coordinates: 41.963°N 33.775°E
- Country: Turkey
- Province: Kastamonu
- District: İnebolu
- Municipality: İnebolu
- Population (2021): 55
- Time zone: UTC+3 (TRT)

Çamlıca is a neighbourhood of the town İnebolu, İnebolu District, Kastamonu Province, Turkey. Its population is 55 (2021).
