= Mishodaghi Mount =

Mountain in East Azerbaijan Province, Iran

Mishoodaghi
- Location within Iran

Highest point
- Elevation: 2,847 m (9,341 ft); 2,855 m (9,367 ft)
- Coordinates: 38°19′33″N 45°37′14″E

Geography
- Location: East Azerbaijan, Iran

Mishoodaghi Mount is a mountain range in East Azerbaijan province of Iran. It is located between Tasouj, Marand, and Shabestar cities. Mishodaghi peak has several peaks including: Ali-Alamdar (highest peak 3155 m), Falak daghi, Kooseh-Baba, and Uzoun-Bel. Yam Ski Resort is located in northern foothills of Mishodaghi.

== Mountain peaks ==
The highest peak of Mishu is Ali Alamdari Mountain with an elevation of 3,200 meters, and Go Zangi Peak with an elevation of 3,100 meters is the second highest peak of Mishu Mountain. Other famous peaks of this mountain range are Falak Daghi Peak, Shanjan Peak, Ozen Yanel Peak, Kosa Baba Peak and Qara Balleh Peak.
