= Qareh Tappeh, Shabestar =

Village in East Azerbaijan province, Iran

Qareh Tappeh Persian: قره‌تپه
- Village
- Location within Iran
- Coordinates: 38°16′15″N 45°21′28″E
- Country: Iran
- Province: East Azerbaijan
- County: Shabestar
- District: Tasuj
- Rural District: Guney-ye Gharbi

Population (2016)
  - Total: 1,634
- Time zone: UTC+3:30 (IRST)

Qareh Tappeh (Persian: قره‌تپه) (Note: Also known as Lak, Lāk-e ‘Olyā, Lāk-e Soflá, Līyek, Qara Tepe, Qareh Tappeh ‘Olya va Soflā, Qareh Tappeh-ye Bālā, Qareh Tappeh-ye ‘Olyā va Soflá, and Qareh Tappeh-ye Pā’īn) is a village in Guney-ye Gharbi Rural District of Tasuj District (Note: Formerly Anzab District) in Shabestar County, East Azerbaijan province, Iran.

== Demographics ==
=== Population ===
At the time of the 2006 National Census, the village's population was 1,768 in 496 households. The following census in 2011 counted 1,667 people in 536 households. The 2016 census measured the population of the village as 1,634 people in 580 households.
