= Ayva =

Ayva can refer to:

- Ayva, Dodurga
- Ayva, İnebolu
