= Cheshmeh Kanan =

Village in East Azerbaijan province, Iran

Cheshmeh Kanan Persian: چشمه كنان
- Village
- Location within Iran
- Coordinates: 38°20′02″N 45°12′38″E
- Country: Iran
- Province: East Azerbaijan
- County: Shabestar
- District: Tasuj
- Rural District: Chehregan

Population (2016)
  - Total: 324
- Time zone: UTC+3:30 (IRST)

Cheshmeh Kanan (Persian: چشمه كنان) (Note: Also romanized as Chashmeh Konān, Cheshmeh Kanān, and Cheshmeh Konān; also known as Chashmeh Khuni, Chechmakyuna, and Cheshmeh Khūni) is a village in Chehregan Rural District of Tasuj District (Note: Formerly Anzab District) in Shabestar County, East Azerbaijan Province, Iran.

== Demographics ==
=== Population ===
At the time of the 2006 National Census, the village's population was 387 in 137 households. The following census in 2011 counted 370 people in 142 households. The 2016 census measured the population of the village as 324 people in 146 households.
