= Yolüstü =

Yolüstü (literally "along the way" in Turkic) may refer to the following places:

== Turkey ==
- Yolüstü, Ardanuç, a village in the district of Ardanuç, Artvin Province
- Yolüstü, Edirne
- Yolüstü, Elâzığ
- Yolüstü, Hasankeyf, a village in the district of Hasankeyf, Batman Province
- Yolüstü, Hınıs
- Yolüstü, İnebolu, a village
- Yolüstü, Karacasu, a village in the district of Karacasu, Aydın Province
- Yolüstü, Merzifon, a village in the district of Merzifon, Amasya Province
- Yolüstü, Sason, a village in the district of Sason, Batman Province
