= B. Alijani =

Iranian meteorologist

- بهلول علیجانی
- Born: 11 April 1946 (age 80); Tehran, Iran
- Education: University of Freiburg Germany
- Occupations: Director of Professional University, producer
- Years active: 2012–present
- Awards: Professor of the country in 2005

Bohloul Alijani (Persian: بهلول علیجانی) is an Iranian meteorologist. He works at Tehran University in Iran.

== Early life ==
He was born in 1946 in Chehregan. He earned a diploma with first prize in 1966 in Tasuj. He served in the army. He was hired as a teacher in Firoozkooh. He completed the natural geography college admissions test in October 1969, and was accepted in 1976 after many university teachers had emigrated to America. After studying for 5 years to earn a PhD in geography and climatology, he returned to Iran. His return coincided with the Islamic Revolution in Iran. The Iran-Iraq war led to the closure of universities and high schools.

== Career ==
Upon the reopening of the university at Yazd, he took up administrative and research activities. He wrote two important books on the foundations of climatology and introduction to the field of geography. He wrote many articles and papers in scientific journals. In 1983 he kjoined the Meteorological Organization in Tehran in 1985. In 1990 he collaborated with Tehran Tarbiat Modarres and transferred to the Tehran Teachers Training University (now the University of al-Khwarizmi).

== Works ==
1. Synoptic climatology, samt, 2002
2. Iran's climate, emissions PNU, 1995
3. Fighting desertification in China, published by the Ministry of Agriculture
4. Earth's climate, samt
