= Yakaboyu, İnebolu =

Village in Turkey

Yakaboyu
- Neighbourhood
- Location in Turkey
- Coordinates: 41.973°N 33.797°E
- Country: Turkey
- Province: Kastamonu
- District: İnebolu
- Municipality: İnebolu
- Population (2021): 490
- Time zone: UTC+3 (TRT)

Yakaboyu is a neighbourhood of the town İnebolu, İnebolu District, Kastamonu Province, Turkey. Its population is 490 (2021).
