= Hacımehmet, İnebolu =

Village in Turkey

Hacımehmet
- Village
- Location in Turkey
- Coordinates: 41°57′26″N 33°41′08″E
- Country: Turkey
- Province: Kastamonu
- District: İnebolu
- Population (2021): 168
- Time zone: UTC+3 (TRT)

Hacımehmet is a village in the İnebolu District of Kastamonu Province in Turkey. Its population is 168 (2021).
