= Erkekarpa, İnebolu =

Village in Turkey

Erkekarpa
- Village
- Location in Turkey
- Coordinates: 41°58′37″N 33°41′42″E
- Country: Turkey
- Province: Kastamonu
- District: İnebolu
- Population (2021): 297
- Time zone: UTC+3 (TRT)

Erkekarpa is a village in the İnebolu District of Kastamonu Province in Turkey. Its population is 297 (2021). Its former name in 15th century was Evkarpa, which is probably corrupted form of Greek name, Ευκαρπία. After the establishment of Turkish Republic the name of the settlement altered to Erkekarpa.
