= Sarıkaya, Bayramören =

Village in Turkey

Sarıkaya
- Village
- Location in Turkey Sarıkaya (Turkey Central Anatolia)
- Coordinates: 40.9672°N 33.1736°E
- Country: Turkey
- Province: Çankırı
- District: Bayramören
- Population (2021): 30
- Time zone: UTC+3 (TRT)

Sarıkaya is a village in the Bayramören District of Çankırı Province in Turkey. Its population is 30 (2021).
