= Uğrak, İnebolu =

Village in Turkey

Uğrak
- Village
- Location in Turkey
- Coordinates: 41.939°N 33.742°E
- Country: Turkey
- Province: Kastamonu
- District: İnebolu
- Population (2021): 325
- Time zone: UTC+3 (TRT)

Uğrak is a village in the İnebolu District of Kastamonu Province in Turkey. Its population is 325 (2021).
