= Soğukpınar, İnebolu =

Village in Turkey

Soğukpınar
- Village
- Location in Turkey
- Coordinates: 41.936°N 33.774°E
- Country: Turkey
- Province: Kastamonu
- District: İnebolu
- Population (2021): 170
- Time zone: UTC+3 (TRT)

Soğukpınar is a village in the İnebolu District of Kastamonu Province in Turkey. Its population is 170 (2021).
