= Üçgazi, Bayramören =

Village in Turkey

Üçgazi
- Village
- Location in Turkey Üçgazi (Turkey Central Anatolia)
- Coordinates: 40°56′N 33°05′E
- Country: Turkey
- Province: Çankırı
- District: Bayramören
- Population (2021): 40
- Time zone: UTC+3 (TRT)

Üçgazi is a village in the Bayramören District of Çankırı Province in Turkey. Its population is 40 (2021).
