= Bayramören District =

District of Çankırı Province, Turkey

- District
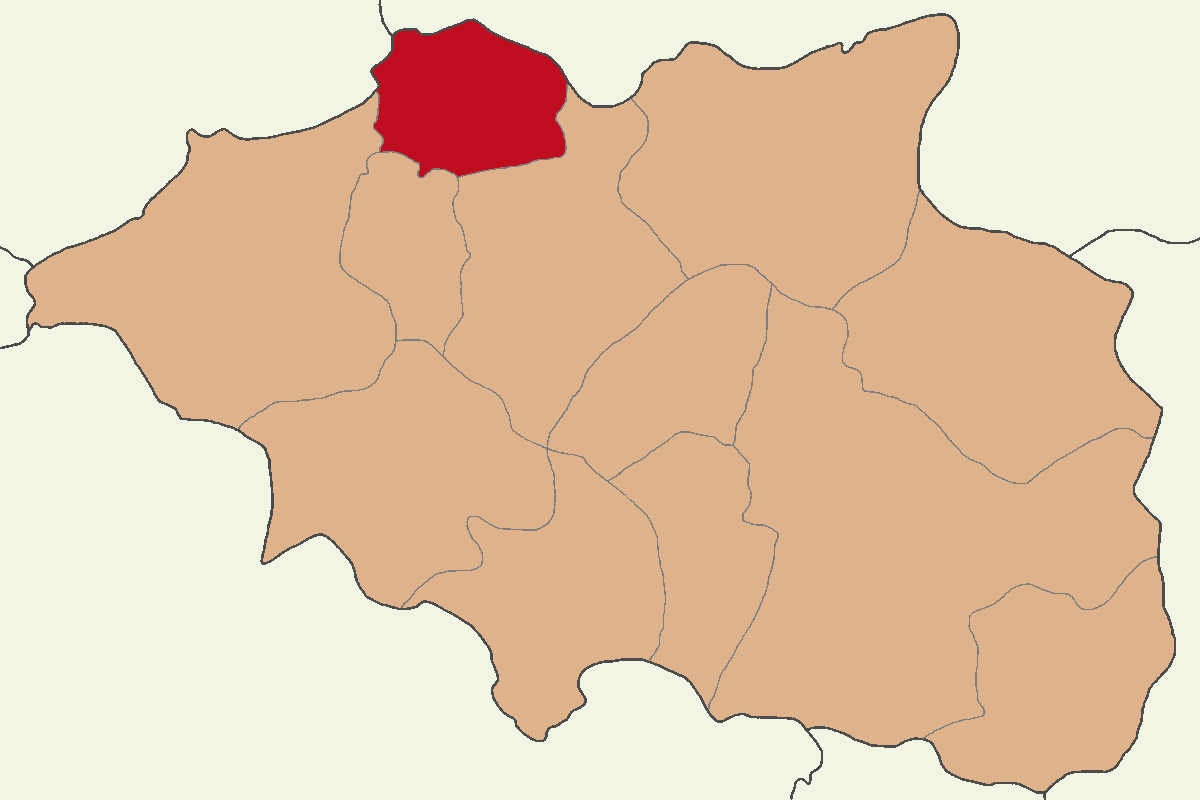
- Map showing Bayramören District in Çankırı Province

- Location in Turkey Bayramören District (Turkey Central Anatolia)
- Coordinates: 40°57′N 33°12′E
- Country: Turkey
- Province: Çankırı
- Seat: Bayramören

Government
  - Kaymakam: Fatmagül Dalmış
- Area: 310 km^{2} (120 sq mi)
- Population (2021): 2,433
  - Density: 7.8/km^{2} (20/sq mi)
- Time zone: UTC+3 (TRT)
- Website: www.bayramoren.gov.tr

Bayramören District is a district of the Çankırı Province of Turkey. Its seat is the town of Bayramören. Its area is 310 km^{2}, and its population is 2,433 (2021).

== Composition ==
There is one municipality in Bayramören District:

- Bayramören

There are 27 villages in Bayramören District:

- Akgüney
- Akseki
- Belenli
- Boğazkaya
- Çakırbağ
- Çayırcık
- Dalkoz
- Dereköy
- Dolaşlar
- Erenler
- Feriz
- Göynükören
- Harmancık
- İncekaya
- Karakuzu
- Karataş
- Kavakköy
- Koçlu
- Oluklu
- Oymaağaç
- Sarıkaya
- Topçu
- Üçgazi
- Yaylatepesi
- Yazıören
- Yurtpınar
- Yusufoğlu
