= Oymaağaç, Bayramören =

Village in Turkey

Oymaağaç
- Village
- Country: Turkey
- Province: Çankırı
- District: Bayramören
- Population (2021): 69
- Time zone: UTC+3 (TRT)

Oymaağaç is a village in the Bayramören District of Çankırı Province in Turkey. Its population is 69 (2021).
