= Hacıibrahim, İnebolu =

Village in Turkey

Hacıibrahim
- Village
- Location in Turkey
- Coordinates: 41°51′53″N 33°54′56″E
- Country: Turkey
- Province: Kastamonu
- District: İnebolu
- Population (2021): 51
- Time zone: UTC+3 (TRT)

Hacıibrahim is a village in the İnebolu District of Kastamonu Province in Turkey. Its population is 51 (2021).
