= Glycon =

Mythical creature; ancient snake god

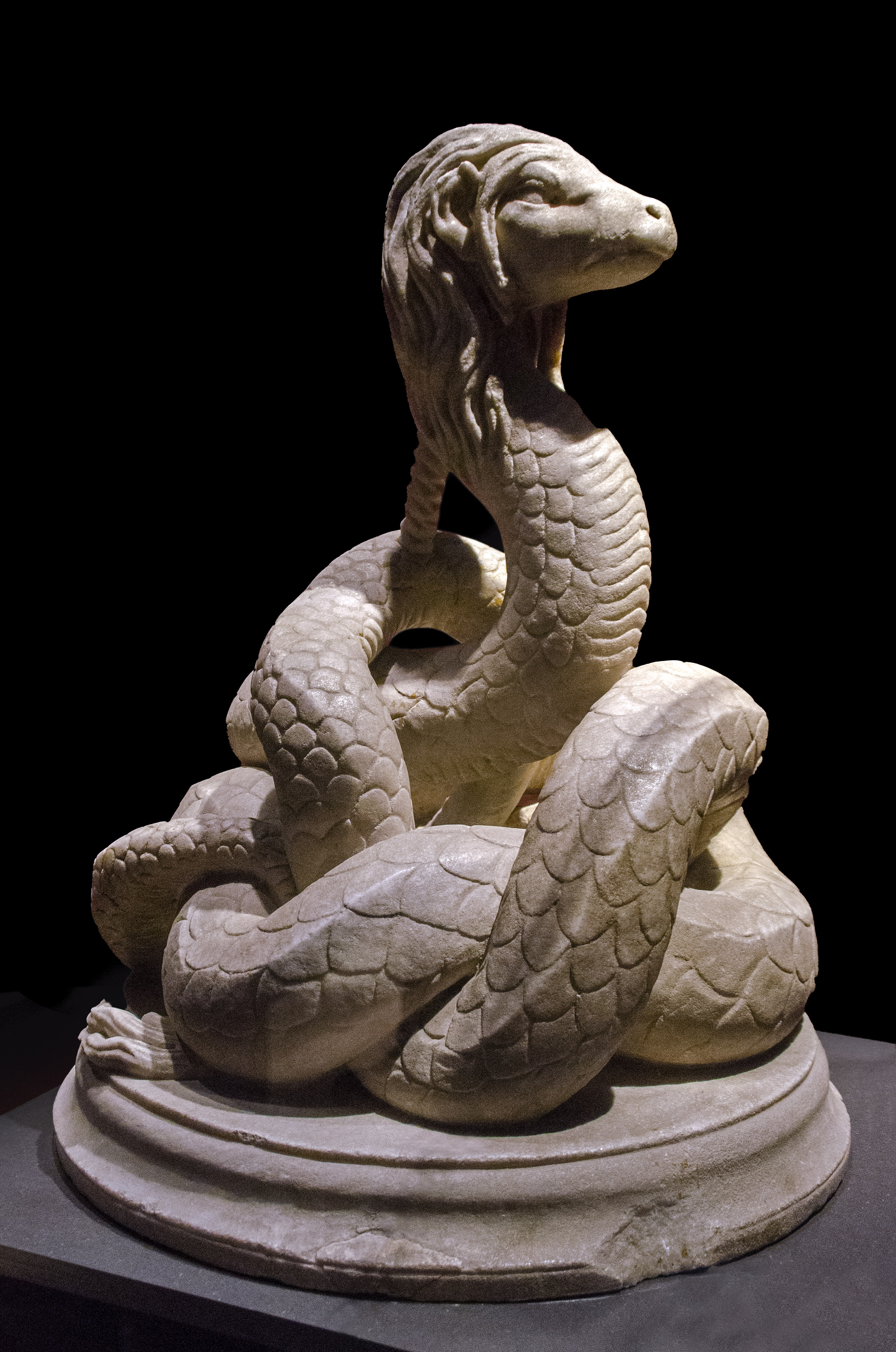
- Late 2nd-century statue of Glycon. (National History and Archeology Museum, Constanţa, Romania)
- Major cult center: Abonoteichos

Glycon, also spelled Glykon (Ancient Greek: Γλύκων Glýkōn, gen: Γλύκωνος Glýkōnos), was an ancient snake god. He had a large and influential cult within the Roman Empire in the 2nd century, with contemporary satirist Lucian providing the primary literary reference to the deity. Lucian claimed Glycon was created in the mid-2nd century by the Greek prophet Alexander of Abonoteichos. Lucian was ill-disposed toward the cult, calling Alexander a false prophet, accusing the whole enterprise of being a hoax, and claiming that Glycon himself was a hand puppet.

== Macedonian cultural roots ==
The cult possibly originated in Macedonia, where similar snake cults had existed for centuries. The Macedonians believed snakes had magical powers relating to fertility and had a rich mythology on this subject, for example the story of Olympias's impregnation by Zeus disguised as a serpent.

== Early years ==
At least initially, the cult did not worship an abstraction or a spirit of a snake but an actual, physical serpent that was said to embody the god. According to the cult's mythology, the snake appeared after Alexander of Abonoteichus had foretold the coming of a new incarnation of Asclepius. When the people gathered in the marketplace of Abonoteichus at noon, when the incarnation was supposed to occur, Alexander produced a goose egg and sliced it open, revealing the god within. Within a week, it grew to the size of a man with the features of a man on its face, including long blond hair. At this point, the figure resembling this description was apparently a puppet that appeared in the temple. In some references, Glycon was a trained snake with a puppet head.

As with previous Macedonian snake cults, the focus of worship at the temple was on fertility. Barren women would bring offerings to Glycon in hopes of becoming pregnant.

== Spread and influence ==
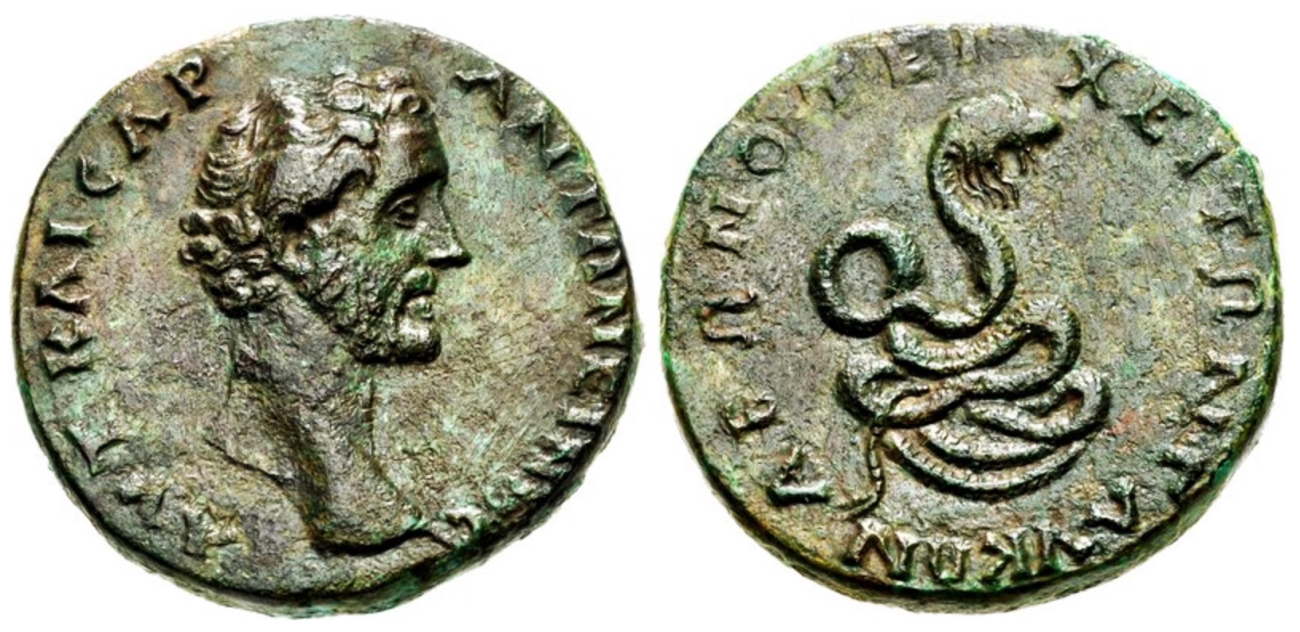
Bronze coin of Antoninus Pius minted in Abonoteichos and showing the snake god Glycon with the legend “ΓΛVΚΩΝ ΑΒΩΝΟΤΕΙΧΕΙΤΩΝ” (29 mm, 16.89 g)

By 160, the worship of Glycon had undoubtedly spread beyond the Aegean. An inscription from Antioch of that date records a slogan, "Glycon protect us from the plague-cloud" that is consistent with the description we have from Lucian. Also in that year the governor of Asia, Publius Mummius Sisenna Rutilianus, declared himself protector of Glycon's oracle. The governor later married Alexander's daughter. According to Lucian, another Roman governor, of Cappadocia, was led by Glycon's oracle to his death in Armenia, and even the Emperor himself was not immune to the cult: Marcus Aurelius sought prophesies from Alexander and his snake god.

Meanwhile, Abonoteichos, a small fishing village before the arrival of the cult, became an important town and accepted another name, Ionopolis. It is uncertain what role the popularity of Glycon played in the rise of the city.

As the cult had an established popularity with the lower social strata, and later several important Roman functionaries and officials were counted among the believers in Glycon and the prophecies of Alexander, including the Emperor at the time, Marcus Aurelius. Such endorsement by the ruling classes coupled with pre existing superstitions of serpents as possessing healing powers, the cult of Glycon likely found no shortage of converts and adherents in new areas of the Roman world.

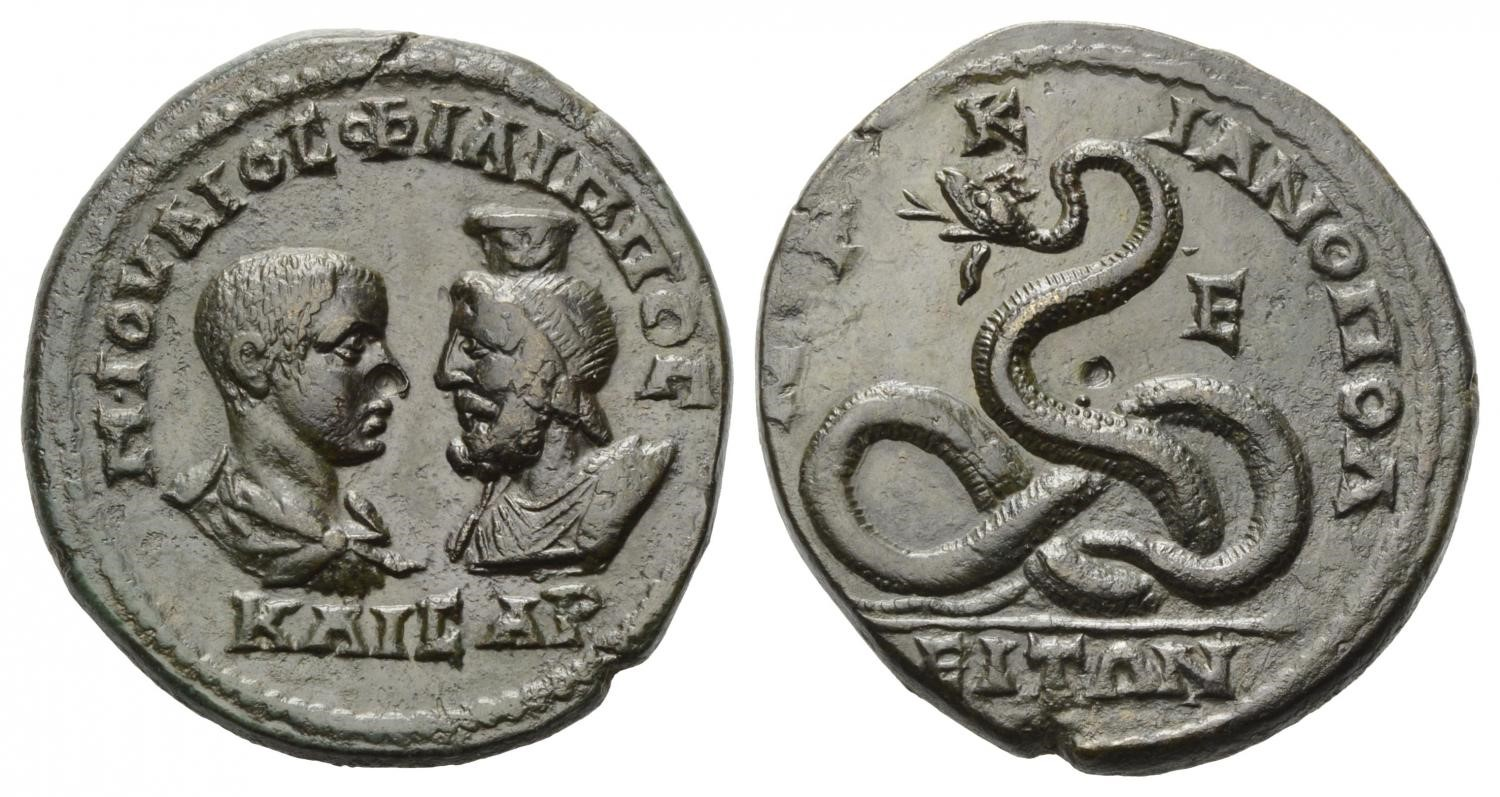
Pentassarion issued under Roman emperor Philip II. in Marcianopolis. Reverse showing a Glycon coiled left, with beard.

In short order, Glycon worship was found throughout the vast area between the Danube and Euphrates. Beginning late in the reign of Antoninus Pius and continuing into the 3rd century, official Roman coins were struck in honor of Glycon, attesting his popularity. The Roman currency bearing the image of Glycon is known to have been in active circulation during 3rd century AD, however it is unknown if some of them were produced in this time period or if they remained in use after being produced earlier, during Alexander's life (c.105-c.170).

It is known that, for at least a hundred years following Alexander's death, a new Glycon cult began to spread its influence along areas adjacent to the Danube, with archaeological finds such as the statue discovered in Tomi (modern day Constanța) being interpreted by some to indicate the presence of a large public cult in the city.

While the cult gradually lost followers after the death of its leader in c.170, it survived for at least a hundred years thereafter, with Alexander being incorporated into its mythology as a grandson of Asclepius. Given the prominence of snake cults as healing divinities in the Mediterranean and surrounding areas, both before and after the rise of Glycon in the region, the spread of the cult continued for some time following the death of Alexander. Some evidence indicates the cult survived into the 4th century. As the contemporary works of Lucian are the primary written reference to Glycon, its cult and their activities, what became of them exactly is unclear following the death of Alexander of Abonoteichos, due to lack of written record.

== Modern times ==
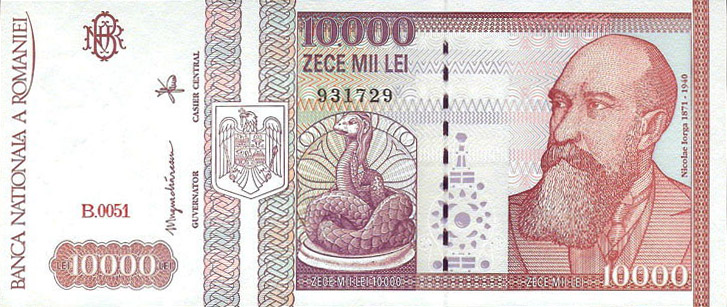
Romanian 10.000 lei bank note of 1994, depicting Glycon in the center.

A marble statue of Glycon was found during an excavation under the former Pallas railway station in Constanța, Romania. The statue is 66 centimetres (26 in) tall and the length of the snake is 4.76 metres (15.6 ft). It is on display at the Constanța History and Archaeology Museum. Romania commemorated this unique sculpture on a postage stamp in 1974, and on a bank note of 10,000 lei in 1994.

Alan Moore, the English comic book writer and occultist, describes himself as a ceremonial magician and devotee of Glycon. Moore states he prefers the belief in a probable hoax deity "because [he is] not likely to start believing that glove puppet created the universe or anything dangerous like that."

== See also ==
- Serpent (symbolism)
- Snake worship
