= Akseki, Bayramören =

Village in Turkey

Akseki
- Village
- Location in Turkey Akseki (Turkey Central Anatolia)
- Coordinates: 40.9769°N 33.2262°E
- Country: Turkey
- Province: Çankırı
- District: Bayramören
- Population (2021): 42
- Time zone: UTC+3 (TRT)

Akseki is a village in the Bayramören District of Çankırı Province in Turkey. Its population is 42 (2021).
