= Dalkoz, Bayramören =

Village in Turkey

Dalkoz
- Village
- Location in Turkey Dalkoz (Turkey Central Anatolia)
- Coordinates: 40°57′N 33°14′E
- Country: Turkey
- Province: Çankırı
- District: Bayramören
- Population (2021): 112
- Time zone: UTC+3 (TRT)

Dalkoz is a village in the Bayramören District of Çankırı Province in Turkey. Its population is 112 (2021).
