= Uluköy, İnebolu =

Village in Turkey

Uluköy
- Village
- Location in Turkey
- Coordinates: 41.965°N 33.686°E
- Country: Turkey
- Province: Kastamonu
- District: İnebolu
- Population (2021): 73
- Time zone: UTC+3 (TRT)

Uluköy is a village in the İnebolu District of Kastamonu Province in Turkey. Its population is 73 (2021).
