= Durulmuş =

- Village
- Location within Turkey Location within Turkey Central Anatolia
- Coordinates: 39°50′N 37°19′E
- Country: Turkey
- Province: Sivas
- District: Hafik
- Population (2022): 168
- Time zone: UTC+3 (TRT)
- Postal code: 58760
- Area code: 0346

Durulmuş is a village in Hafik District, Sivas Province, Turkey. Its population is 168 (2022).
