= Hafik District =

District of Sivas Province, Turkey

- District
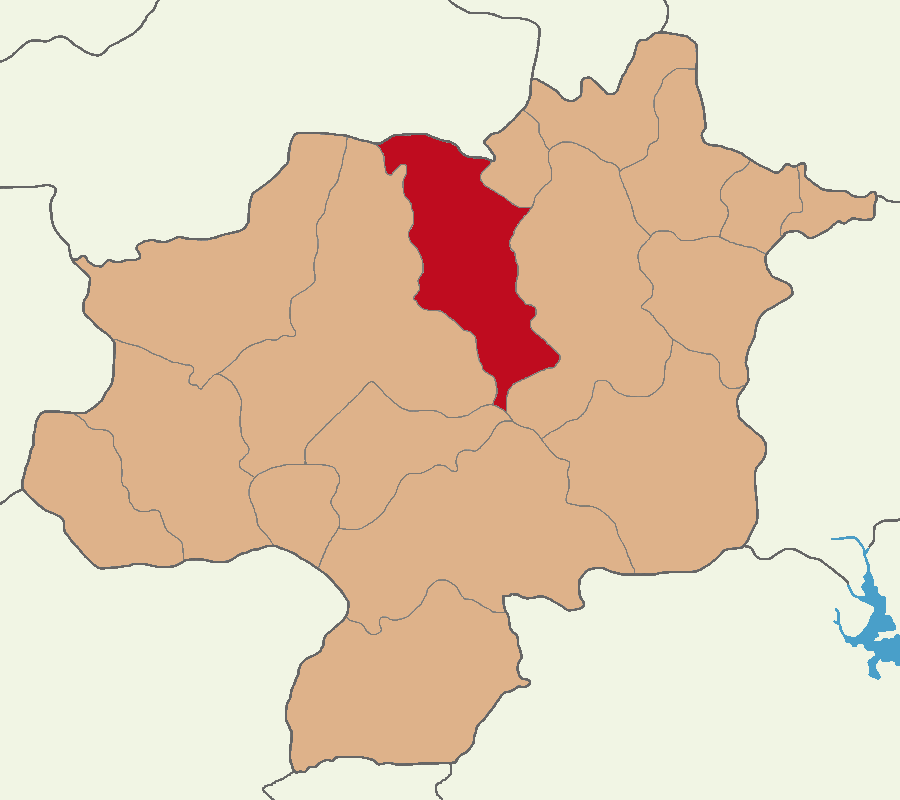
- Map showing Hafik District in Sivas Province

- Location in Turkey Hafik District (Turkey Central Anatolia)
- Coordinates: 39°51′N 37°23′E
- Country: Turkey
- Province: Sivas
- Seat: Hafik

Government
  - Kaymakam: Kadir Algın
- Area: 1,765 km^{2} (681 sq mi)
- Population (2022): 9,569
  - Density: 5.4/km^{2} (14/sq mi)
- Time zone: UTC+3 (TRT)
- Website: www.hafik.gov.tr

Hafik District is a district of the Sivas Province of Turkey. Its seat is the town of Hafik. Its area is 1,765 km^{2}, and its population is 9,569 (2022).

== Composition ==
There is one municipality in Hafik District:

- Hafik

There are 74 villages in Hafik District:

- Acıpınar
- Adamlı
- Akkaya
- Aktaş
- Alanyurt
- Alçıören
- Alibeyli
- Aylıoğlu
- Bahçecik
- Bakımlı
- Bayıraltı
- Bayramtepe
- Benlikaya
- Besinli
- Beydili
- Beykonağı
- Çakmak
- Çaltılı
- Celalli
- Çimenyenice
- Çınarlı
- Çömlekli
- Değirmenboğazı
- Değirmenseki
- Demirciköy
- Derince
- Dışkapı
- Düğer
- Dündar
- Durulmuş
- Düzyayla
- Ekingölü
- Emre
- Esenli
- Esentepe
- Evci
- Eymir
- Gedikçayırı
- Gölcük
- Göydün
- Günyamaç
- İnandık
- İnköy
- Kabalı
- Kamışköy
- Karayaprak
- Karlı
- Kaytarmış
- Kızılcaören
- Kızılören
- Koşutdere
- Küpecik
- Kurugöl
- Madenköy
- Mansurlu
- Olukbaşı
- Otmanalan
- Oymadere
- Özen
- Pirhüseyin
- Pusat
- Şahinköy
- Sofular
- Süleymaniye
- Tavşanlı
- Topçuyeniköy
- Tuzhisar
- Üreğil
- Üzeyir
- Yakaboyu
- Yalıncak
- Yalnızağıl
- Yarhisar
- Yeniköy
