= Yaylatepesi, Bayramören =

Village in Turkey

Yaylatepesi
- Village
- Location in Turkey Yaylatepesi (Turkey Central Anatolia)
- Coordinates: 41°04′N 33°11′E
- Country: Turkey
- Province: Çankırı
- District: Bayramören
- Population (2021): 42
- Time zone: UTC+3 (TRT)

Yaylatepesi is a village in the Bayramören District of Çankırı Province in Turkey. Its population is 42 (2021).
