= Dibek, İnebolu =

Village in Turkey

Dibek
- Village
- Location within Turkey
- Coordinates: 41.928°N 33.895°E
- Country: Turkey
- Province: Kastamonu
- District: İnebolu
- Population (2021): 218
- Time zone: UTC+3 (TRT)

Dibek is a village in the İnebolu District of Kastamonu Province in northern Turkey on the shores of the Black Sea. Its population is 218 (2021).
