= Hamitköy, İnebolu =

Village in Turkey

Hamitköy
- Village
- Location in Turkey
- Coordinates: 41.921°N 33.671°E
- Country: Turkey
- Province: Kastamonu
- District: İnebolu
- Population (2021): 197
- Time zone: UTC+3 (TRT)

Hamitköy is a village in the İnebolu District of Kastamonu Province in Turkey. Its population is 197 (2021).
