= Chehregan =

Village in East Azerbaijan province, Iran

Chehregan Persian: چهرگان
- Village
- Location within Iran
- Coordinates: 38°20′43″N 45°16′43″E
- Country: Iran
- Province: East Azerbaijan
- County: Shabestar
- District: Tasuj
- Rural District: Chehregan

Population (2016)
  - Total: 1,297
- Time zone: UTC+3:30 (IRST)

Chehregan (Persian: چهرگان) (Note: Also romanized as Chehregān; also known as Chegrevan, Chehraqān, Chehravān, Chehrehqān, and Chehreqān) is a village in, and the capital of, Chehregan Rural District in Tasuj District (Note: Formerly Anzab District) of Shabestar County, East Azerbaijan province, Iran.

== Demographics ==
=== Population ===
At the time of the 2006 National Census, the village's population was 1,300 in 409 households. The following census in 2011 counted 1,225 people in 406 households. The 2016 census measured the population of the village as 1,297 people in 471 households. It was the most populous village in its rural district.
