= Neda Alijani =

Iranian physician

- Born: 1981 (age 44–45)
- Medical career
- Field: Infectious diseases
- Institutions: Tehran University of Medical Sciences
- Awards: International Prof Yalda Award

Neda Alijani (Persian: ندا علیجانی) (born 1981) is an Iranian infectious disease physician and assistant professor at Tehran University of Medical Sciences. She is a winner of International Prof Yalda Award.
