= Keloğlu, İnebolu =

Village in Turkey

Keloğlu
- Village
- Location in Turkey
- Coordinates: 41°51′04″N 33°50′02″E
- Country: Turkey
- Province: Kastamonu
- District: İnebolu
- Population (2021): 16
- Time zone: UTC+3 (TRT)

Keloğlu is a village in the İnebolu District of Kastamonu Province in Turkey. Its population is 16 (2021).
