= Feriz, Bayramören =

Village in Turkey

Feriz
- Village
- Location in Turkey Feriz (Turkey Central Anatolia)
- Coordinates: 41°02′N 33°16′E
- Country: Turkey
- Province: Çankırı
- District: Bayramören
- Population (2021): 29
- Time zone: UTC+3 (TRT)

Feriz is a village in the Bayramören District of Çankırı Province in Turkey. Its population is 29 (2021).
