= Yusufoğlu, Bayramören =

Village in Turkey

Yusufoğlu
- Village
- Location within Turkey Location within Turkey Central Anatolia
- Coordinates: 40°56′55″N 33°9′7″E
- Country: Turkey
- Province: Çankırı
- District: Bayramören
- Population (2021): 126
- Time zone: UTC+3 (TRT)

Yusufoğlu is a village in the Bayramören District of Çankırı Province in Turkey. Its population is 126 (2021).
