= Üçlüce, İnebolu =

Village in Turkey

Üçlüce
- Village
- Location in Turkey
- Coordinates: 41°53′37″N 33°51′45″E
- Country: Turkey
- Province: Kastamonu
- District: İnebolu
- Population (2021): 54
- Time zone: UTC+3 (TRT)

Üçlüce is a village in the İnebolu District of Kastamonu Province in Turkey. Its population is 54 (2021).
