= Çaydüzü, İnebolu =

Village in Turkey

Çaydüzü
- Village
- Location in Turkey
- Coordinates: 41°55′21″N 33°37′11″E
- Country: Turkey
- Province: Kastamonu
- District: İnebolu
- Population (2021): 80
- Time zone: UTC+3 (TRT)

Çaydüzü is a village in the İnebolu District of Kastamonu Province in Turkey. Its population is 80 (2021).
