= Oluklu, Bayramören =

Village in Turkey

Oluklu
- Village
- Country: Turkey
- Province: Çankırı
- District: Bayramören
- Population (2021): 94
- Time zone: UTC+3 (TRT)

Oluklu is a village in the Bayramören District of Çankırı Province in Turkey. Its population is 94 (2021).
