= Abonoteichos =

Ancient city in Asia Minor

Coordinates: 41°58′26″N 33°45′58″E

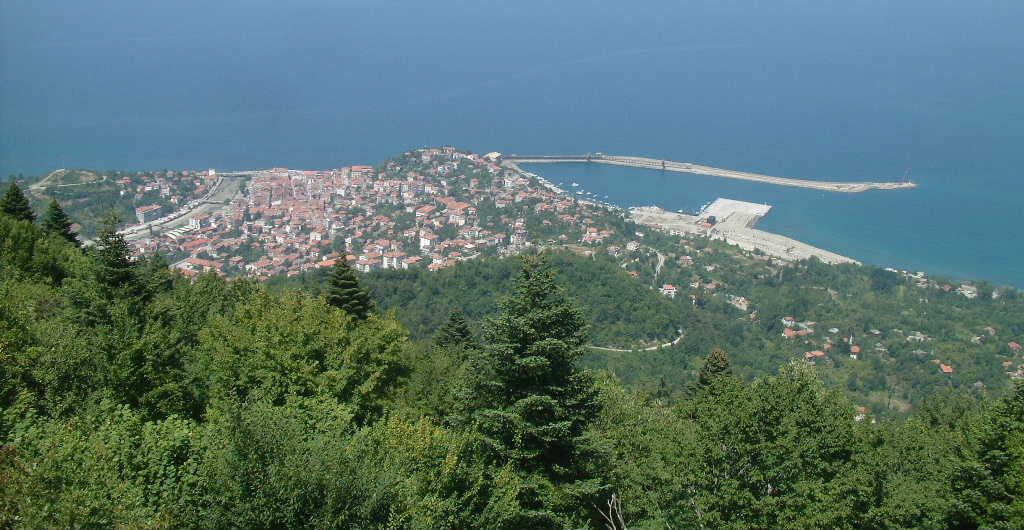
Area around Abonoteichos

Abonoteichos (Ancient Greek: Ἀβώνου τεῖχος, romanized: Abṓnou teîchos, demonym: Αβωνοτειχίτης, Abōnoteichítēs), later Ionopolis (Ιωνόπολις, Ionópolis; Turkish: İnebolu), was an ancient city in Asia Minor, on the site of modern İnebolu (in Asian Turkey), and remains a Latin Catholic titular see.

== History ==
Abonoteichos was a town on the coast of Paphlagonia, memorable as the birthplace of the infamous fortuneteller Alexander Abonoteichites, founder of the cult of Glycon, of whom Lucian left an amusing account in the treatise bearing his name. According to Lucian, Alexander petitioned the Roman emperor (probably Antoninus Pius) that the name of his native place should be changed from Abonoteichos to Ionopolis; and whether the emperor granted the request or not, we know that the town was called Ionopolis in later times.

Not only does this name occur in Marcian of Heraclea and Hierocles, but on coins of the time of Antoninus and Lucius Verus we find the legend Ionopoliton (ΙΩΝΟΠΟΛΙΤΩΝ), as well as Abonoteichiton (ΑΒΩΝΟΤΕΙΧΙΤΩΝ). The modern Turkish name İnebolu is evidently a corruption of Ionopolis.

It was the site of a 2nd-century AD temple of Apollo.

== Ecclesiastical history of Ionopolis ==
It was important enough in the Roman province of Paphlagonia to become a suffragan bishopric of the Metropolitan of its capital Gangra, but faded later. Michel LeQuien mentions eight bishops between 325 and 878 and Ionopolis is mentioned in the later “Notitiae episcopatuum.”

- Petronius of Ionopolis was at the Council of Nicaea
- Rhenus, at the Council of Chalcedon
- Diogenes of Ionopolis, at Council of Ephesus
- .....ios, bishop of Ionopolis. (known only from a 10th century coin)
- Niketas, bishop of Ionopolis and chartoularios of the Great Orphanotropheion. 11th century
- John, bishop of Ionopolis 11th century

=== Catholic titular see ===
The diocese was nominally revived as a Latin Catholic titular bishopric under the name Ionopolis, which was spelled Jonopolis in the Roman Curia (besides Italian Gionopoli) from 1929 to 1971.

It has been vacant for decades, having had the following incumbents, both of the lowest (episcopal) and intermediary (archiepiscopal) ranks :

- Titular Bishop Wilhelm Hermann Ignaz Ferdinand von Wolf-Metternich zu Gracht (1720.09.16 – 1722.10.28)
- Titular Bishop Joannes Karski (1771.07.29 – 1785)
- Titular Bishop Bishop-elect John Murphy (1815.02.21 – 1815.02.21)
- Titular Bishop Bishop-elect Ferdinand Corbi (1833.09.30 – ?)
- Titular Bishop Wincenty Lipski (1856.09.18 – 1875.12.13)
- Titular Archbishop James Gibbons (1877.05.29 – 1877.10.03), previously Titular Bishop of Adramyttium (1868.03.03 – 1872.07.30) & Apostolic Vicar of North Carolina (USA) (1868.03.03 – 1877.05.20), also Bishop of Richmond (USA) (1872.07.30 – 1877.05.29); later Coadjutor Archbishop of Baltimore (USA) (1877.05.29 – 1877.10.03), succeeding as Metropolitan Archbishop of Baltimore (1877.10.03 – 1921.03.24), Cardinal-Priest of S. Maria in Trastevere (1887.03.17 – 1921.03.24), becoming Protopriest of the Sacred College of Cardinals (1920.12.07 – 1921.03.24)
- Titular Archbishop Francis Xavier Leray (1879.09.30 – 1883.12.28)
- Titular Bishop Giacomo Daddi (1884.03.24 – 1897?)
- Titular Bishop Andrea Cassato (1898.03.24 – 1913.05.01)
- Titular Bishop Henri Doulcet, Passionists (C.P.) (1913.06.03 – 1914.03.17); previously Bishop of Nikopol (Bulgaria) (1895.01.07 – 1913.03.31); later Titular Archbishop of Dioclea (1914.03.17 – 1916.07.27)
- Titular Bishop Joseph John Fox (1914.11.07 – 1915.03.14)
- Titular Bishop Nicolás Gonzalez Pérez, Claretians (C.M.F.) (1918.08.24 – 1935.03.23)
- Titular Bishop Eugène-Louis-Marie Le Fer de la Motte (1935.07.08 – 1936.07.20)
- Titular Bishop Johann Baptist Dietz (1936.07.25 – 1939.04.10), Coadjutor Bishop of Fulda (Germany) (1936.07.25 – 1939.04.10), succeeding as Bishop of Fulda (1939.04.10 – 1958.10.24), later Titular Archbishop of Cotrada (1958.10.24 – 1959.12.10)
- Titular Bishop Maurice-Auguste-Eugène Foin (1939.06.10 – 1948.07.10)
- Titular Bishop Hubert Joseph Paulissen, Society of African Missions (S.M.A.) (1951.11.15 – 1966.08.12)
