= Alaca, İnebolu =

Village in Turkey

Alaca
- Village
- Location in Turkey
- Coordinates: 41.956°N 33.618°E
- Country: Turkey
- Province: Kastamonu
- District: İnebolu
- Population (2021): 58
- Time zone: UTC+3 (TRT)

Alaca is a village in the İnebolu District of Kastamonu Province in Turkey. Its population is 58 (2021).
