= Karataş, Bayramören =

Village in Turkey

Karataş
- Village
- Country: Turkey
- Province: Çankırı
- District: Bayramören
- Population (2021): 63
- Time zone: UTC+3 (TRT)

Karataş is a village in the Bayramören District of Çankırı Province in Turkey. Its population is 63 (2021).
