= Beyler, İnebolu =

Village in Turkey

Beyler
- Village
- Location in Turkey
- Coordinates: 41.916°N 33.771°E
- Country: Turkey
- Province: Kastamonu
- District: İnebolu
- Population (2021): 57
- Time zone: UTC+3 (TRT)

Beyler is a village in the İnebolu District of Kastamonu Province in Turkey. Its population is 57 (2021).
