= Tupchi, Iran =

Tupchi توپچي
- Village
- Location within Iran
- Coordinates: 38°20′00″N 45°10′49″E
- Country: Iran
- Province: East Azerbaijan
- County: Shabestar
- Bakhsh: Tasuj
- Rural District: Chehregan

Population (2006)
  - Total: 402
- Time zone: UTC+3:30 (IRST)
  - Summer (DST): UTC+4:30 (IRDT)

Tupchi (Persian: توپچي, also Romanized as Tūpchī and Toopchi; also known as Topchi) is a village in Chehregan Rural District, Tasuj District, Shabestar County, East Azerbaijan Province, Iran. At the 2006 census, its population was 402, in 94 families.
