= Yurtpınar, Bayramören =

Village in Turkey

Yurtpınar
- Village
- Location in Turkey Yurtpınar (Turkey Central Anatolia)
- Coordinates: 40°56′43″N 33°9′24″E
- Country: Turkey
- Province: Çankırı
- District: Bayramören
- Population (2021): 34
- Time zone: UTC+3 (TRT)

Yurtpınar is a village in the Bayramören District of Çankırı Province in Turkey. Its population is 34 (2021).
