= Boğazkaya, Bayramören =

Village in Turkey

Boğazkaya
- Village
- Location in Turkey
- Coordinates: 40°59′21″N 33°16′51″E
- Country: Turkey
- Province: Çankırı
- District: Bayramören
- Elevation: 980 m (3,220 ft)

Population (2024)
  - Total: 19
- Time zone: UTC+3 (TRT)
- Postal code: 18322
- Area code: 0376

Boğazkaya is a village in the Bayramören District of Çankırı Province, Turkey. According to the Address-Based Population Registration System (ADNKS), the village had a population of 16 in 2021.

== Name ==
The village was historically known as Gebil. The etymology of the name is uncertain, and no definitive linguistic explanation has been published in academic literature. The name was replaced by "Boğazkaya" during early Republican-era efforts to standardize settlement names across Turkey, particularly following the 1927 place-name regulations.

Boğazkaya lies near the village of Koçlu (historically Doma), a former Greek settlement whose name was also changed during the same period.

For context on name changes in the region, see: Place name changes in Turkey.

== History ==
The wider Bayramören region contains settlement traces from Byzantine, Greek, and Turkish periods. Boğazkaya’s proximity to the historically Greek village of Doma (now Koçlu) suggests that the area once hosted a multilingual toponymic landscape.

== Demographics ==
According to the Address-Based Population Registration System (ADNKS) and data compiled by nufusune.com, the population of Boğazkaya between 2007 and 2024 is as follows:

Population of Boğazkaya (2007–2024)
Year	Total	Male	Female
2024	19	12	7
2023	24	14	10
2022	24	13	11
2021	16	7	9
2020	21	10	11
2019	34	18	16
2018	56	30	26
2017	18	10	8
2016	25	13	12
2015	31	16	15
2014	35	18	17
2013	32	16	16
2012	28	14	14
2011	35	18	17
2010	35	19	16
2009	38	21	17
2008	47	26	21
2007	47	26	21

== Infrastructure ==
Boğazkaya has access to electricity, a village water supply, and local roads linking it to Bayramören.

== Culture ==
Local traditions reflect rural Anatolian cultural patterns. Vernacular stone-and-timber architecture remains visible, and regional culinary practices such as the preparation of keşkek are noted in local descriptions.

== See also ==
- Bayramören
- Çankırı Province
- Place name changes in Turkey
