= Gökçevre, İnebolu =

Village in Turkey

Gökçevre
- Village
- Location in Turkey
- Coordinates: 41°55′52″N 33°39′24″E
- Country: Turkey
- Province: Kastamonu
- District: İnebolu
- Population (2021): 145
- Time zone: UTC+3 (TRT)

Gökçevre is a village in the İnebolu District of Kastamonu Province in Turkey. Its population is 145 (2021).
