= Hafik =

- Municipality
- Location in Turkey Hafik (Turkey Central Anatolia)
- Coordinates: 39°51′10″N 37°23′02″E
- Country: Turkey
- Province: Sivas
- District: Hafik

Government
  - Mayor: Harun İsa Gültay (MHP)
- Elevation: 1,350 m (4,430 ft)
- Population (2022): 3,594
- Time zone: UTC+3 (TRT)
- Area code: 0346
- Website: www.hafik.bel.tr

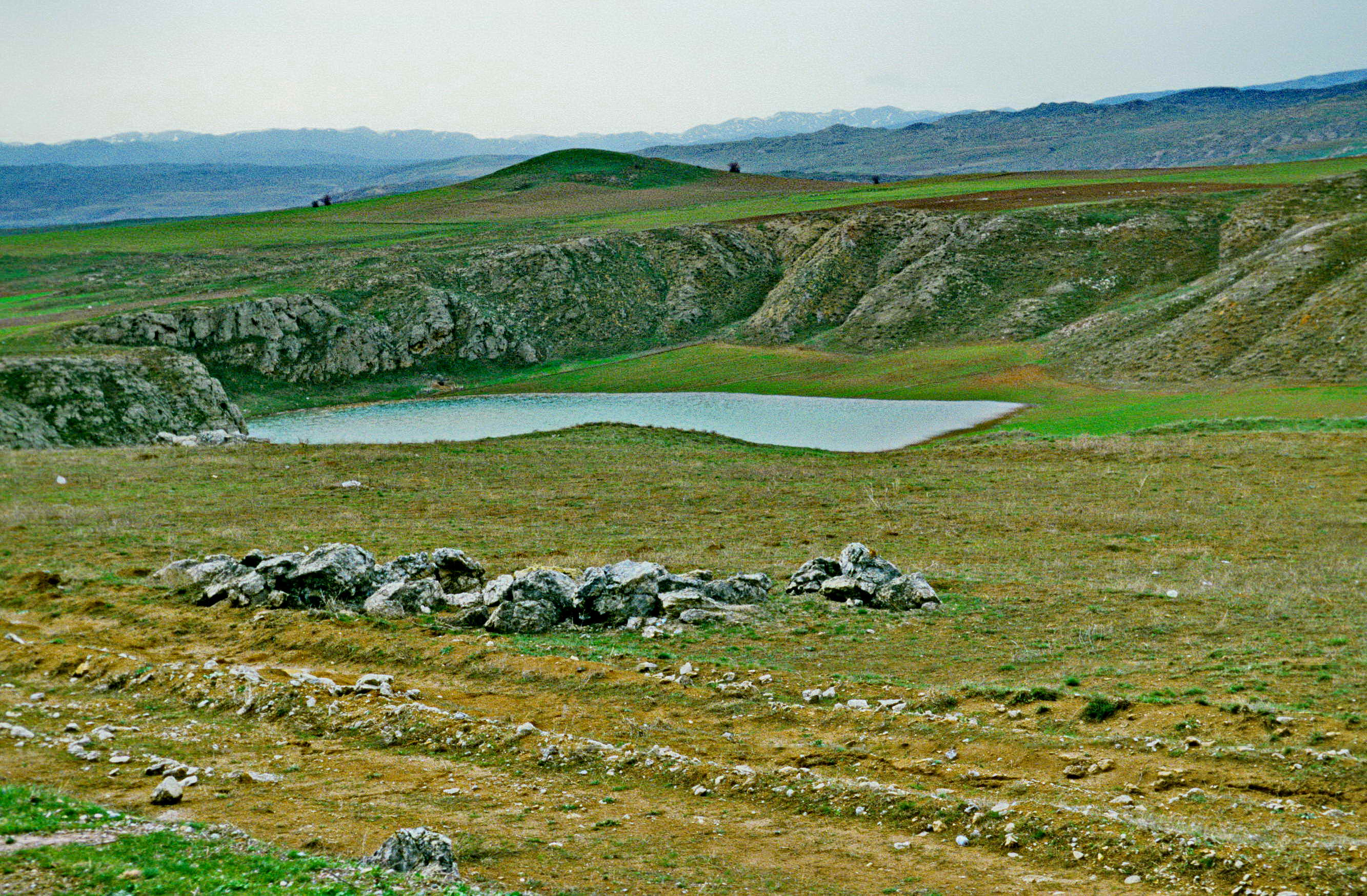
Hafik (Koçhisar) Gölü (also Büyük Göl).

Hafik is a town in Sivas Province of Turkey. It is the seat of Hafik District. Its population is 3,594 (2022). The mayor is Harun İsa Gültay (MHP).
