= Çayırcık, Bayramören =

Village in Turkey

Çayırcık
- Village
- Country: Turkey
- Province: Çankırı
- District: Bayramören
- Population (2021): 34
- Time zone: UTC+3 (TRT)

Çayırcık is a village in the Bayramören District of Çankırı Province in Turkey. Its population is 34 (2021).
