= Belenli, Bayramören =

Village in Turkey

Belenli
- Village
- Location in Turkey Belenli (Turkey Central Anatolia)
- Coordinates: 40°57′23″N 33°16′34″E
- Country: Turkey
- Province: Çankırı
- District: Bayramören
- Population (2021): 84
- Time zone: UTC+3 (TRT)

Belenli is a village in the Bayramören District of Çankırı Province in Turkey. Its population is 84 (2021).
