= Güneşli, İnebolu =

Village in Turkey

Güneşli
- Village
- Location in Turkey
- Coordinates: 41.959°N 33.598°E
- Country: Turkey
- Province: Kastamonu
- District: İnebolu
- Population (2021): 92
- Time zone: UTC+3 (TRT)

Güneşli is a village in the İnebolu District of Kastamonu Province in Turkey. Its population is 92 (2021).
