= Çakırbağ, Bayramören =

Village in Turkey

Çakırbağ
- Village
- Location in Turkey Çakırbağ (Turkey Central Anatolia)
- Coordinates: 40.9708°N 33.0616°E
- Country: Turkey
- Province: Çankırı
- District: Bayramören
- Population (2021): 71
- Time zone: UTC+3 (TRT)

Çakırbağ is a village in the Bayramören District of Çankırı Province in Turkey. Its population is 71 (2021).
