= Guney-ye Gharbi Rural District =

Rural district in East Azerbaijan province, Iran

Guney-ye Gharbi Rural District Persian: دهستان گوني غربي
- Rural District
- Location within Iran
- Coordinates: 38°16′N 45°25′E
- Country: Iran
- Province: East Azerbaijan
- County: Shabestar
- District: Tasuj
- Established: 1987
- Capital: Til

Population (2016)
  - Total: 8,339
- Time zone: UTC+3:30 (IRST)

Guney-ye Gharbi Rural District (Persian: دهستان گوني غربي) is in Tasuj District (Note: Formerly Anzab District) of Shabestar County, East Azerbaijan province, Iran. Its capital is the village of Til.

== Demographics ==
=== Population ===
At the time of the 2006 National Census, the rural district's population was 7,867 in 2,295 households. There were 7,505 inhabitants in 2,395 households at the following census of 2011. The 2016 census measured the population of the rural district as 8,339 in 2,856 households. The most populous of its nine villages was Til, with 3,303 people.

=== Other villages in the rural district ===
- Almas
- Haft Cheshmeh
- Heris
- Heydarabad
- Qaleh-ye Maraghush
- Qareh Tappeh
- Sheykh Vali
