= Kabalarsökü, İnebolu =

Village in Turkey

Kabalarsökü
- Village
- Location in Turkey
- Coordinates: 41°54′15″N 33°41′48″E
- Country: Turkey
- Province: Kastamonu
- District: İnebolu
- Population (2021): 312
- Time zone: UTC+3 (TRT)

Kabalarsökü is a village in the İnebolu District of Kastamonu Province in Turkey. Its population is 312 (2021).
