= Yam Ski Resort =

Ski resort in Marand, Iran

Coordinates: 38.337°N 45.7802°E

Yam Ski Resort, also calls Payam Ski Resort, is a ski resort in Marand, East Azerbaijan, Iran. It is operated by the East Azerbaijan Province Ski Federation. The resort is located in the northern foothills of Mishodaghi. It is one of the oldest ski resorts in Iran still operating, and it has a ski lift. Ski season normally starts in January and continues until the end of March.
