= Erenler, Bayramören =

Village in Turkey

Erenler
- Village
- Location in Turkey Erenler (Turkey Central Anatolia)
- Coordinates: 40°56′37″N 33°7′51″E
- Country: Turkey
- Province: Çankırı
- District: Bayramören
- Population (2021): 129
- Time zone: UTC+3 (TRT)

Erenler is a village in the Bayramören District of Çankırı Province in Turkey. Its population is 129 (2021).
