= Köseköy, İnebolu =

Village in Turkey

Köseköy
- Village
- Location within Turkey
- Coordinates: 41.947°N 33.629°E
- Country: Turkey
- Province: Kastamonu
- District: İnebolu
- Population (2021): 30
- Time zone: UTC+3 (TRT)

Köseköy is a village in the İnebolu District of Kastamonu Province in Turkey. Its population is 30 (2021).
