= Karakuzu, Bayramören =

Village in Turkey

Karakuzu
- Village
- Location in Turkey Karakuzu (Turkey Central Anatolia)
- Coordinates: 41°01′41″N 33°10′53″E
- Country: Turkey
- Province: Çankırı
- District: Bayramören
- Population (2021): 141
- Time zone: UTC+3 (TRT)

Karakuzu is a village in the Bayramören District of Çankırı Province in Turkey. Its population is 141 (2021).
