= Toklukaya, İnebolu =

Village in Turkey

Toklukaya
- Village
- Location in Turkey
- Coordinates: 41.918°N 33.705°E
- Country: Turkey
- Province: Kastamonu
- District: İnebolu
- Population (2021): 315
- Time zone: UTC+3 (TRT)

Toklukaya is a village in the İnebolu District of Kastamonu Province in Turkey. Its population is 315 (2021).
