= Yaztepe, İnebolu =

Village in Turkey

Yaztepe
- Village
- Location in Turkey
- Coordinates: 41°58′44″N 33°39′33″E
- Country: Turkey
- Province: Kastamonu
- District: İnebolu
- Population (2021): 110
- Time zone: UTC+3 (TRT)

Yaztepe is a village in the İnebolu District of Kastamonu Province in Turkey. Its population is 110 (2021).
