= Kabalar, İnebolu =

Village in Turkey

Kabalar
- Village
- Location in Turkey
- Coordinates: 41.898°N 33.682°E
- Country: Turkey
- Province: Kastamonu
- District: İnebolu
- Population (2021): 461
- Time zone: UTC+3 (TRT)

Kabalar is a village in the İnebolu District of Kastamonu Province in Turkey. Its population is 461 (2021).
