= Deliktaş, İnebolu =

Village in Turkey

Deliktaş
- Village
- Location in Turkey
- Coordinates: 41.886°N 33.913°E
- Country: Turkey
- Province: Kastamonu
- District: İnebolu
- Population (2021): 61
- Time zone: UTC+3 (TRT)

Deliktaş is a village in the İnebolu District of Kastamonu Province in Turkey. Its population is 61 (2021).
