= Akçay, İnebolu =

Akçay
- Village
- Location within Turkey
- Coordinates: 41.9634°N 33.6228°E
- Country: Turkey
- Province: Kastamonu
- District: İnebolu
- Population (2021): 41
- Time zone: UTC+3 (TRT)

Akçay is a village in the İnebolu District, Kastamonu Province, Turkey. Its population is 41 (2021).
