= Akgüney, Bayramören =

Village in Turkey

Akgüney
- Village
- Location in Turkey Akgüney (Turkey Central Anatolia)
- Coordinates: 40.9279°N 33.1655°E
- Country: Turkey
- Province: Çankırı
- District: Bayramören
- Population (2021): 28
- Time zone: UTC+3 (TRT)

Akgüney is a village in the Bayramören District of Çankırı Province in Turkey. Its population is 28 (2021).
