= İnebolu =

- Municipality
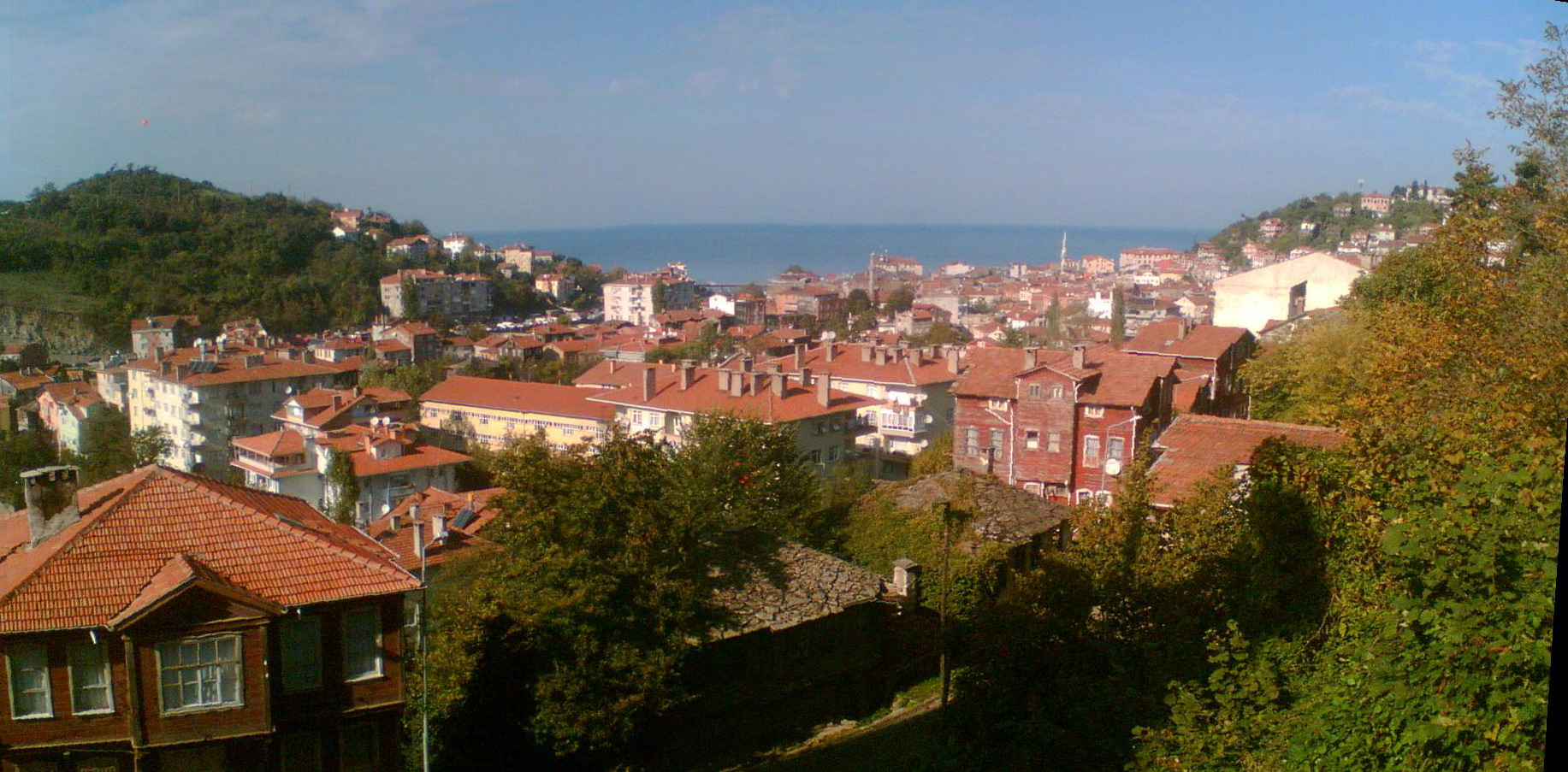
- A panorama of İnebolu

- Coat of arms

- Location within Turkey
- Coordinates: 41°58′29″N 33°45′39″E
- Country: Turkey
- Province: Kastamonu
- District: İnebolu

Government
  - Mayor: Engin Uzuner (MHP)
- Elevation: 25 m (82 ft)
- Population (2021): 10,594
- Time zone: UTC+3 (TRT)
- Postal code: 37500
- Area code: 0366
- Climate: Cfa
- Website: www.inebolu.bel.tr

İnebolu is a town and district of the Kastamonu Province in the Black Sea region of Turkey. It is 590 km (367 mi) from Istanbul by road and 89 km (55 mi) north of Kastamonu. It is a typical Black Sea port town with many fine examples of traditional domestic architecture. It is the seat of İnebolu District. Its population is 10,594 (2021).

== History ==
See Abonoteichos/Ionopolis for Ancient and ecclesiastical history

The exact founding date of İnebolu is unknown. İnebolu was initially called Abonoteichos. The name was changed to Ionopolis (Ιωνόπολις in greek, meaning "city of Iones")in the middle of the 2nd century CE. Over time, the name "Ionopolis" metamorphosed to "Inepolis", and then to "İnebolu", though sometimes spelled "Ineboli" by foreign travellers.

By 1834, İnebolu was considered a sub-district of today's city of Küre (approx. 30 km (19 mi) inland), but it became a district in its own right in 1867. In the late 19th and early 20th century, İnebolu was part of the Kastamonu Vilayet of the Ottoman Empire.

Visiting in August 1893, British parliamentarian and explorer H. F. B. Lynch noted how little then remained of the old Greek cities of the 'Argonautic shore'. At "Ineboli" he reports finding a fragment of ancient sculpted marble near the shore, and describes the town as a line of white-faced houses with roofs of red tiles [that] nestles beneath the mountain wall. The Greeks live on one side, the Turks on the other: and the intelligent man to whom you naturally address yourself is an Armenian in European dress. Lynch also reports that "carriageable roads" had recently been constructed inland to Kastamuni.

During the Turkish War of Independence, arms and ammunition were transferred to Anatolia through İnebolu. The town was attacked and defended itself with determination, for which it was honoured with the Independence Medal by the Turkish Grand National Assembly.

Atatürk initiated a campaign in İnebolu to reform personal appearance and "civilize" garments; Atatürk made a well-known speech about hats there.

As of 1920, İnebolu was populated mainly by Turks, and was estimated at having a population of around 9,000. The port exported mohair, animal hide, wool, and hemp. They imported mainly manufactured products.

In accordance with the population exchange between Greece and Turkey in 1923, the town's Greek inhabitants were exiled to Greece. Many of these emigrants settled in a neighborhood called Inepolis in the Athenian suburb of Nea Ionia.

== Archaeology ==
There is little left of archaeological note in İnebolu, other than the ruins of its first, second and third fortifications.

The ruins of the first castle, most of which has been destroyed and upon which much has been built, are located in Boyran. The east wall of the castle extends from the İnebolu River, over the Abas hill, and up to the quarter called Avara. The ruins of the fortress walls are located around the cemeteries on the Abas hills. A part of the north wall of the interior castle, which is 6 meters high and 3 meters wide, still stands.

The second castle stood where today's Karadeniz primary school is. A few parts of the walls can still be seen.

The third castle is on Gerisch hill, from where the whole region of İnebolu can be seen. It is located south of the town and is of considerable height. There are also the undated ruins of a monastery, which have been heavily pillaged by artifact-seekers. Only some parts of the walls, large main entrance stairs, the baptismal basin and well remain. Greeks who live in İnebolu celebrate the 15th of August here by holding a feast.

== Geography ==
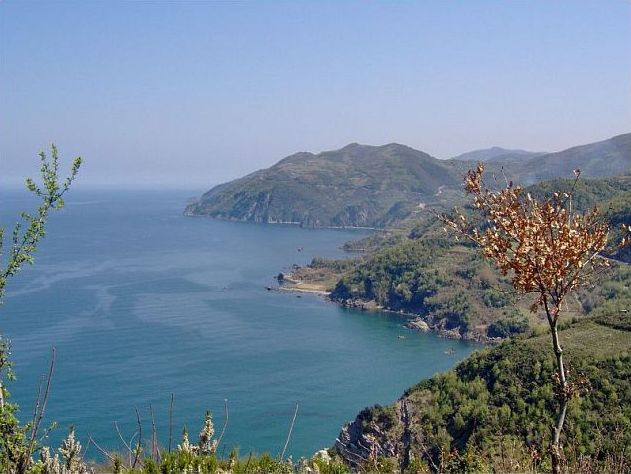
Black Sea coast and the countryside

There are many small towns scattered around İnebolu. To the east lie Abana and Bozkurt. To the west is Cide and to the south lie Devrekani and Küre. The town consists of 14 quarters: Aşağıhatipbağı, Avrara, Boyran, Camikebir, Cünüriye, Karadeniz, Y.Hatipbağı, Yenimahalle, Çamlıca, Musaköy, Karaca, Kızılkara, Yakaboyu and Yeşilöz.

Küre Mountains (formerly Isfendiyar Mountains) rise above the coastline, which is narrow and steep, with few sandy beaches.

The sea around İnebolu is approximately 200 meters deep.

=== Rivers ===
The region's rivers flow down from the Isfendiyar mountains through İnebolu and its surroundings to the Black Sea. The river beds are irregular and deep. The currents are strong.

Some of the important rivers around İnebolu are:

1. Adıyaman Çayı
2. Doğanyurt Çayı
3. Gemiciler Çayı
4. Kızılkara Çayı
5. Koyran Çayı
6. Küre Çayı
7. Manastır Çayı
8. Özlüce Çayı

=== Topography ===
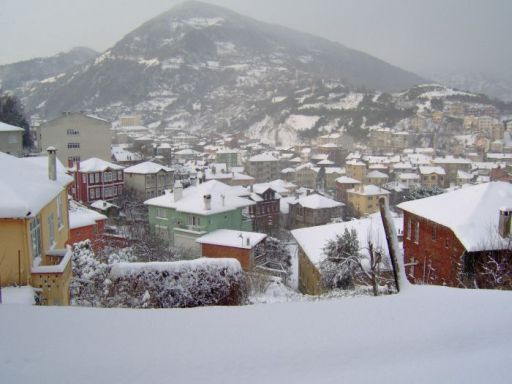
Winter in İnebolu

The town is surrounded by many hills of varying height. The most well-known are the Geriş hill (Geriş Tepesi), which is 495 meters high, and the Islam hill to the southwest, which is 589 metres high.

Other hills are :

1. To the east, Darıca hill, Manastır hill (789 m)
2. To the west, Abas hill (1261 m), Keleştiren hill (1260 m)
3. To the southwest, Çuha hill
4. To the southeast, Yukarı Bozu hill (389 m)

=== Climate ===
İnebolu has an humid subtropical climate (Köppen climate classification: Cfa).

Climate data for İnebolu (1991–2020)
Month	Jan	Feb	Mar	Apr	May	Jun	Jul	Aug	Sep	Oct	Nov	Dec	Year
Mean daily maximum °C (°F)	9.8 (49.6)	9.9 (49.8)	11.7 (53.1)	15.0 (59.0)	19.4 (66.9)	24.4 (75.9)	27.4 (81.3)	27.9 (82.2)	24.1 (75.4)	19.8 (67.6)	15.5 (59.9)	11.9 (53.4)	18.1 (64.6)
Daily mean °C (°F)	6.0 (42.8)	6.0 (42.8)	7.7 (45.9)	10.9 (51.6)	15.2 (59.4)	19.9 (67.8)	22.6 (72.7)	22.9 (73.2)	19.3 (66.7)	15.4 (59.7)	11.2 (52.2)	8.0 (46.4)	13.8 (56.8)
Mean daily minimum °C (°F)	3.1 (37.6)	2.9 (37.2)	4.5 (40.1)	7.5 (45.5)	11.6 (52.9)	15.7 (60.3)	17.9 (64.2)	18.4 (65.1)	15.2 (59.4)	11.9 (53.4)	7.7 (45.9)	4.9 (40.8)	10.2 (50.4)
Average precipitation mm (inches)	114.19 (4.50)	88.18 (3.47)	82.82 (3.26)	47.42 (1.87)	56.69 (2.23)	53.34 (2.10)	51.52 (2.03)	46.75 (1.84)	97.18 (3.83)	154.06 (6.07)	115.35 (4.54)	147.13 (5.79)	1,054.63 (41.52)
Average precipitation days (≥ 1.0 mm)	12.4	10.5	10.9	7.6	7.9	6.4	4.5	4.3	7.6	10.2	9.3	12.2	103.8
Average relative humidity (%)	76.3	76.5	76.4	77.6	80.0	77.1	75.2	74.8	77.2	79.5	76.0	74.8	76.8
Mean monthly sunshine hours	70.3	83.1	120.2	166.7	211.3	270.0	310.5	286.2	202.7	142.4	105.3	65.1	2,034
Source: NOAA

=== Vegetation ===
The region is thickly wooded.

== Economy ==
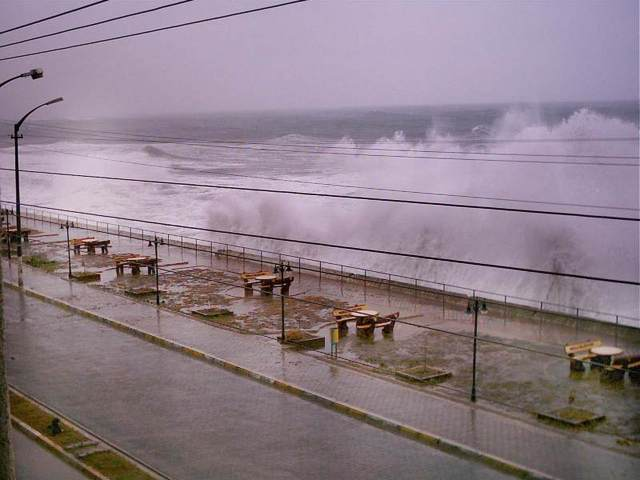
Harbor way in İnebolu

Historically, the port of İnebolu was a bustling merchant city, long considered the gateway to east. Its Chamber of Commerce was founded in 1887; at the time, records indicate that İnebolu was home to 2500 registered merchants and 1000 independent craftsmen. However, traffic was eventually routed around Kastamonu and İnebolu lost its commercial importance, leaving only the timber industry viable.

As of 1920, İnebolu was the location of a small shipbuilding industry at the Inebolu Shipyard. The boats built were described as being of "primitive design but sound workmanship." They were generally exported to Istanbul.

== Land use ==
Soil conditions make most agriculture difficult, but fruit, wheat and corn are cultivated. Inland, there are thick forests and grasslands where cattle is farmed.

=== Fruit and vegetables ===
Tomatoes, beans, zucchini and paprika are the most popular vegetables grown in İnebolu. Chestnuts, pears, mulberries, figs, walnuts, cranberry and hazelnuts are also grown in the region.

Mushrooms and wild strawberries are famous in this region and can be found in the woods easily.

=== Beekeeping ===
İnebolu is known for its thriving apiary industry.

=== Fishery ===
A fishing co-operative was established in 1986. Depending on the season, one can find the following fish species in İnebolu: anchovy, turbot, whiting, horse mackerel, grey mullet, bluefish, çinekop ("young of the bluefish"), bonito, mackerel, thornback ray, garfish and so on.

=== Forestry ===
Forestry is important in İnebolu. There are 672.10 square kilometres of forest. 390.95 km^{2} (151 sq mi) are mixed woodland, where beech, black fir, oak, birch tree and pine can all be found. 76.75 km^{2} (30 sq mi) are wild forest. 257.78 km^{2} (100 sq mi) are controlled forest and trees.

The export of timber products increased from 1985 to 1996 by 250%. In 1986, the town had 20 timber processing enterprises.

=== Hunting ===
This region is home to wild boars and bears.

== Architecture ==
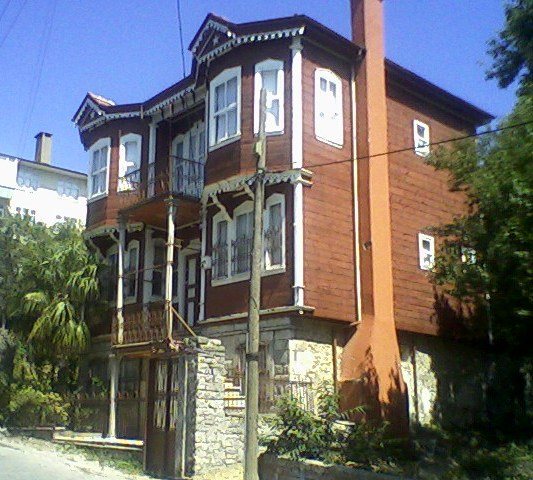
An old mansion in the town

İnebolu has several examples of traditional Turkish architecture in the Ottoman style. By the end of the 19th century many wealthy inhabitants İnebolu built large houses along the banks of the İkiçay river that divides the town. By 1890, the town had hundreds of houses built in this special style:

The ground floor is built of stone and contains a cellar and pantry. Above it are one or two stories, each containing four bedrooms, one antechamber, a kitchen and toilet. Each of the floors is built so that it can easily be converted into one independent flat by closing a single door. This feature allows the married children of families to continue living in the same ancestral home they grew up in. Each floor also has its own separate street access.

The rooms have many windows and each room has a corbel and framework which enables the women to look out onto the street without being seen. The ceilings of the rooms are high and covered in carved art. Hand-rails in the houses are carved from a single piece of wood.

Most of the houses have roofs that are tiled with a special sea-stone called marla . The tiles are wide, thin and heavy, and protect the houses from the strong northeast winds that blow across the Black Sea. The stone also provides an excellent insulation against heat.

Each house has an orchard garden, where fruits such as plums, mulberries, apples, pears, hazelnuts and walnuts are grown. Each garden has a well, which is used to refrigerate foodstuffs during the hot summer days.

The houses are painted with a special claret mineral pigment known as aşı boyası, which is highly resistant to sunlight and weathering.

== Transport ==
There is no passenger boat service to İnebolu. However, motorways and highways are sufficient and in good condition. There are several private bus companies which have scheduled bus service to and from Istanbul, Ankara and the provincial capital of Kastamonu. Nearby towns such Kure, Cide, Abana and Bozkurt can be travelled to by mini-buses which run many times a day.

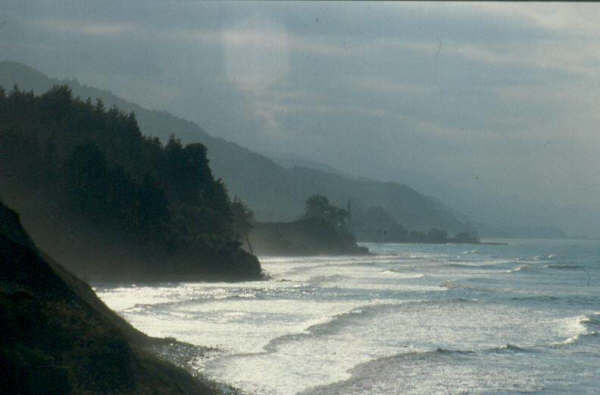
Boyran neighbourhood of İnebolu

== In popular culture ==
In the early summer of 2015, the movie Mustang was filmed in and around the town, the geography of which was featured prominently.
