= Üçevler, İnebolu =

Village in Turkey

Üçevler
- Village
- Location in Turkey
- Coordinates: 41.954°N 33.833°E
- Country: Turkey
- Province: Kastamonu
- District: İnebolu
- Population (2021): 36
- Time zone: UTC+3 (TRT)

Üçevler is a village in the İnebolu District of Kastamonu Province in Turkey. Its population is 36 (2021).
