= Yazıören, Bayramören =

Village in Turkey

Yazıören
- Village
- Location in Turkey Yazıören (Turkey Central Anatolia)
- Coordinates: 40°56′23″N 33°06′35″E
- Country: Turkey
- Province: Çankırı
- District: Bayramören
- Population (2021): 60
- Time zone: UTC+3 (TRT)

Yazıören is a village in the Bayramören District of Çankırı Province in Turkey. Its population is 60 (2021).
