= Akgüney, İnebolu =

Village in Turkey

Akgüney
- Village
- Location in Turkey
- Coordinates: 41.913°N 33.508°E
- Country: Turkey
- Province: Kastamonu
- District: İnebolu
- Population (2021): 167
- Time zone: UTC+3 (TRT)

Akgüney is a village in the İnebolu District of Kastamonu Province in Turkey. Its population is 167 (2021).
