= Sakalar, İnebolu =

Village in Turkey

Sakalar
- Village
- Location in Turkey
- Coordinates: 41.950°N 33.683°E
- Country: Turkey
- Province: Kastamonu
- District: İnebolu
- Population (2021): 145
- Time zone: UTC+3 (TRT)

Sakalar is a village in the İnebolu District of Kastamonu Province in Turkey. Its population is 145 (2021).
