= Yakaboyu, Hafik =

Village in Turkey

Yakaboyu
- Village
- Location within Turkey Location within Turkey Central Anatolia
- Coordinates: 40°09′16″N 37°22′18″E
- Country: Turkey
- Province: Sivas
- District: Hafik
- Elevation: 1,347 m (4,419 ft)
- Population (2022): 231
- Time zone: UTC+3 (TRT)

Yakaboyu is a köy (village) in Hafik District, Sivas Province, Turkey. Its population is 231 (2022).

The village is located on the edge of Tokat Province, with an elevation of 4,422 feet (1,348 m).
