= Alireza Yalda =

Iranian infectious disease physician and professor

- Born: 1930
- Died: 2017 (aged 86–87)
- Medical career
- Profession: Infectious disease physician
- Institutions: Tehran University of Medical Sciences

Alireza Yalda (Persian: علیرضا یلدا) (1930-2017) was an Iranian infectious disease physician and professor at Tehran University of Medical Sciences. He is credited as the father of infectious diseases in Iran. Alireza Yalda Foundation named after him grants awards to young researchers annually.
