= Yukarıçaylı, İnebolu =

Village in Turkey

Yukarıçaylı
- Village
- Location in Turkey
- Coordinates: 41.926°N 33.747°E
- Country: Turkey
- Province: Kastamonu
- District: İnebolu
- Population (2021): 146
- Time zone: UTC+3 (TRT)

Yukarıçaylı is a village in the İnebolu District of Kastamonu Province in Turkey. Its population is 146 (2021).
