= Taşburun, İnebolu =

Village in Turkey

Taşburun
- Village
- Location in Turkey
- Coordinates: 41.979°N 33.679°E
- Country: Turkey
- Province: Kastamonu
- District: İnebolu
- Population (2021): 87
- Time zone: UTC+3 (TRT)

Taşburun is a village in the İnebolu District of Kastamonu Province in Turkey. Its population is 87 (2021).
