= Qızılca, Nakhchivan =

Qızılca
- Municipality
- Location within Azerbaijan
- Coordinates: 39°07′11″N 45°37′28″E
- Country: Azerbaijan
- Autonomous republic: Nakhchivan
- District: Julfa

Population (2005)
  - Total: 439
- Time zone: UTC+4 (AZT)

Qızılca (also, Gyzyldzha, Kizildzha and Kyzyldzha) is a village and municipality in the Julfa District of Nakhchivan, Azerbaijan. It is located 22 km in the north from the district center, on the slope of the Zangezur ridge. Its population is busy with vine-growing, grain-growing and animal husbandry. There are secondary school, club, library, and a medical center in the village. It has a population of 439.

== Etymology ==
The name of the village is related with the territory where it is located. The area has been named qızılı (red) because of the color its land.
