= Göçkün, İnebolu =

Village in Turkey

Göçkün
- Village
- Location in Turkey
- Coordinates: 41.924°N 33.700°E
- Country: Turkey
- Province: Kastamonu
- District: İnebolu
- Population (2021): 398
- Time zone: UTC+3 (TRT)

Göçkün is a village in the İnebolu District of Kastamonu Province in Turkey. Its population is 398 (2021).
