= Yolüstü, İnebolu =

Village in Turkey

Yolüstü
- Village
- Location in Turkey
- Coordinates: 41.905°N 33.734°E
- Country: Turkey
- Province: Kastamonu
- District: İnebolu
- Population (2021): 115
- Time zone: UTC+3 (TRT)

Yolüstü is a village in the İnebolu District of Kastamonu Province in Turkey. Its population is 115 (2021).
