= Yukarıköy, İnebolu =

Village in Turkey

Yukarıköy
- Village
- Location in Turkey
- Coordinates: 41°56′58″N 33°41′22″E
- Country: Turkey
- Province: Kastamonu
- District: İnebolu
- Population (2021): 207
- Time zone: UTC+3 (TRT)

Yukarıköy is a village in the İnebolu District of Kastamonu Province in Turkey. Its population is 207 (2021).
