= Ayvaköy, İnebolu =

Village in Turkey

Ayvaköy
- Village
- Location in Turkey
- Coordinates: 41.941°N 33.779°E
- Country: Turkey
- Province: Kastamonu
- District: İnebolu
- Population (2021): 39
- Time zone: UTC+3 (TRT)

Ayvaköy is a village in the İnebolu District of Kastamonu Province in Turkey. Its population is 39 (2021).
