= İkizler, İnebolu =

Village in Turkey

İkizler
- Village
- Location in Turkey
- Coordinates: 41.954°N 33.842°E
- Country: Turkey
- Province: Kastamonu
- District: İnebolu
- Population (2021): 37
- Time zone: UTC+3 (TRT)

İkizler is a village in the İnebolu District of Kastamonu Province in Turkey. Its population is 37 (2021).
