= Topçu (name) =

Topçu may refer to:

- Canan Topçu (born 1965), Turkish German female writer
- Dumitru Topciu (born Dmitriy Topçu; 1888–1958), Gagauz Romanian politician
- Ebru Topçu (born 1996), Turkish female footballer
- Mutlu Topçu (born 1970), former Turkish footballer
- Yalçın Topçu (born 1957), Turkish politician
- Yaşar Topçu (born 1941), Turkish politician and former government minister
