= Bayramören =

- Municipality
- Location in Turkey Bayramören (Turkey Central Anatolia)
- Coordinates: 40°56′35″N 33°12′14″E
- Country: Turkey
- Province: Çankırı
- District: Bayramören

Government
  - Mayor: Raşit Güngör (AKP)
- Area: 310 km^{2} (120 sq mi)
- Elevation: 850 m (2,790 ft)
- Population (2021): 476
  - Density: 1.5/km^{2} (4.0/sq mi)
- Time zone: UTC+3 (TRT)
- Postal code: 18300
- Area code: 0376
- Website: www.bayramoren.bel.tr

Bayramören is a small town and the seat of Bayramören District in Çankırı Province, Turkey. It is located in the Central Anatolia region. Its population is 476 (2021).

== History ==
Bayramören became a municipality in 1972 and was elevated to district status in 1991. Historically, the town developed as a small agricultural settlement with close social ties and traditional rural life.

== Geography ==
Bayramören lies in the northwestern part of Çankırı Province. It is situated among hilly terrains and plateaus shaped by small rivers and seasonal streams. Elevation ranges from 800 m to 1,000 m above sea level. The landscape consists of cultivated fields, forested slopes, and open highland areas.

=== Climate ===
The district has a continental climate, with cold, snowy winters and hot, dry summers.

=== Adjacent districts ===
- North: Araç (Kastamonu)
- West: Çerkeş (Çankırı) and Ovacık (Karabük)
- South: Atkaracalar and Kurşunlu (Çankırı)
- East: Kurşunlu (Çankırı)

== Administration ==
The district has one municipality (Bayramören) and 27 villages. Local government activities mainly support agriculture, rural infrastructure, and small-scale services.

== Demographics ==
The district population is approximately 2,430, with 476 people living in the town center (2021).

=== Historical population ===
Historical population of Bayramören District
| Year | Total | Urban | Rural |
|---|---|---|---|
| 1990 | 7,310 | 2,042 | 5,268 |
| 2000 | 6,617 | 2,697 | 3,920 |
| 2007 | 2,608 | 754 | 1,854 |
| 2008 | 2,509 | 664 | 1,845 |
| 2009 | 2,640 | 880 | 1,760 |
| 2010 | 2,502 | 690 | 1,812 |
| 2011 | 2,422 | 634 | 1,788 |
| 2012 | 2,442 | 689 | 1,753 |
| 2013 | 2,816 | 702 | 2,114 |
| 2014 | 2,546 | 627 | 1,919 |
| 2015 | 2,361 | 571 | 1,790 |
| 2016 | 2,275 | 597 | 1,678 |
| 2017 | 2,126 | 562 | 1,564 |
| 2018 | 4,258 | 869 | 3,389 |
| 2019 | 2,924 | 589 | 2,335 |
| 2020 | 2,611 | 507 | 2,104 |

== Economy ==
Agriculture and livestock breeding form the backbone of the local economy. Wheat, barley, and legumes are among the most commonly grown crops, while cattle and sheep farming support household livelihoods. Small local shops and seasonal migration for work supplement income.

== Transportation ==
Bayramören is connected to surrounding districts by regional roads.

- Road access: regional route linking Bayramören to Kurşunlu and Çerkeş
- Bus services: regional minibus and coach transportation is available
- Nearest railway station: Çankırı railway station (~80 km)
- Nearest airport: Ankara Esenboğa Airport (~160 km)

== Culture and community ==
Bayramören maintains traditional Central Anatolian rural culture. Social life often centers around mosques, village squares, and seasonal gatherings. Handcrafted food products and communal celebrations remain part of local identity. Natural surroundings provide opportunities for outdoor activities.

== Villages ==
Akgüney, Akseki, Asmarlı, Belenli, Boğazkaya, Bulgurçayırı, Çakırbağ, Çayırcık, Dereköy, Göynükören, Gürpınar, İncekaya, Karakuzu, Karlı, Kayıören, Kavaklı, Koçlu, Kozlu, Sarıkaya, Sazcılı, Uluçay, Yaylatepesi, Yazıören, Yeniköy, Yürükören, Yusufoğlu.
