= Tupchi, Afghanistan =

Village in Afghanistan

Coordinates: 34.8167°N 67.9667°E

Tupchi (also Topchi, Topci, and Kala Topchi) is a village in Bamyan Province, Afghanistan.

== See also ==
- Bamyan Province
