= Tasuj =

City in East Azerbaijan province, Iran

Tasuj Persian: تسوج
- City
- Location within Iran
- Coordinates: 38°18′53″N 45°21′37″E
- Country: Iran
- Province: East Azerbaijan
- County: Shabestar
- District: Tasuj

Population (2016)
  - Total: 7,522
- Time zone: UTC+3:30 (IRST)

Tasuj (Persian: تسوج) (Note: Also romanized as Tasooj, Tasūj, and Ţasūj; also known as Tasvīch) is a city in, and the capital of, Tasuj District (Note: Formerly Anzab District) in Shabestar County, East Azerbaijan province, Iran.

== Demographics ==
=== Language ===
It is an Azeri Turkic speaking city.

=== Population ===
At the time of the 2006 National Census, the city's population was 7,332 in 2,108 households. The following census in 2011 counted 7,370 people in 2,288 households. The 2016 census measured the population of the city as 7,522 people in 2,514 households.
