= Topçu, Ismailli =

Topçu
- Municipality
- Location within Azerbaijan
- Coordinates: 40°52′41″N 48°04′06″E
- Country: Azerbaijan
- Rayon: Ismailli

Population
  - Total: 1,431
- Time zone: UTC+4 (AZT)
  - Summer (DST): UTC+5 (AZT)

Topçu (also, Topchi, Topchu, and Torchu) is a village and municipality in the Ismailli Rayon of Azerbaijan. It has a population of 1,431.
