= Chehregan Rural District =

Rural district in East Azerbaijan province, Iran

Chehregan Rural District Persian: دهستان چهرگان
- Rural District
- Location within Iran
- Coordinates: 38°18′N 45°15′E
- Country: Iran
- Province: East Azerbaijan
- County: Shabestar
- District: Tasuj
- Established: 1987
- Capital: Chehregan

Population (2016)
  - Total: 2,981
- Time zone: UTC+3:30 (IRST)

Chehregan Rural District (Persian: دهستان چهرگان) is in Tasuj District (Note: Formerly Anzab District) of Shabestar County, East Azerbaijan province, Iran. Its capital is the village of Chehregan.

== Demographics ==
=== Population ===
At the time of the 2006 National Census, the rural district's population was 3,509 in 1,037 households. There were 3,171 inhabitants in 1,053 households at the following census of 2011. The 2016 census measured the population of the rural district as 2,981 in 1,088 households. The most populous of its seven villages was Chehregan, with 1,297 people.

=== Other villages in the rural district ===
- Cheshmeh Kanan
- Ghelman Saray
