= İnebolu District =

District of Kastamonu Province, Turkey

- District
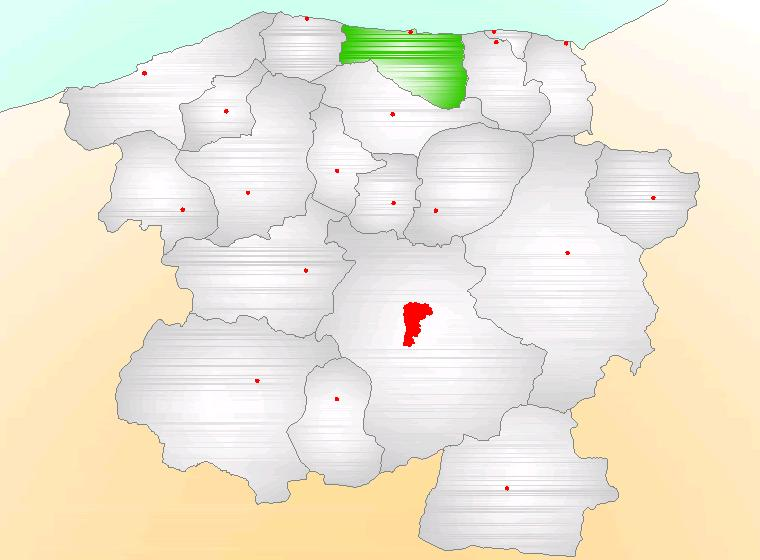
- Map showing İnebolu District (green) in Kastamonu Province

- Location in Turkey
- Coordinates: 41°58′N 33°46′E
- Country: Turkey
- Province: Kastamonu
- Seat: İnebolu

Government
  - Kaymakam: Ahmet Vezir Baycar
- Area: 417 km^{2} (161 sq mi)
- Population (2021): 20,675
  - Density: 50/km^{2} (130/sq mi)
- Time zone: UTC+3 (TRT)
- Website: www.inebolu.gov.tr

İnebolu District is a district of the Kastamonu Province of Turkey. Its seat is the town of İnebolu. Its area is 417 km^{2}, and its population is 20,675 (2021).

== Composition ==
There is one municipality in İnebolu District:

- İnebolu

There are 77 villages in İnebolu District:

- Akçay
- Akgüney
- Akkonak
- Aktaş
- Alaca
- Aşağıçaylı
- Atabeyli
- Ayvaköy
- Ayvat
- Başköy
- Bayıralan
- Belen
- Belence
- Belören
- Beyler
- Çamdalı
- Çaydüzü
- Çaykıyı
- Çiçekyazı
- Çubuk
- Deliktaş
- Deresökü
- Dibek
- Dikili
- Doğanören
- Durupınar
- Erenyolu
- Erkekarpa
- Esenyurt
- Evrenye
- Göçkün
- Gökbel
- Gökçevre
- Güde
- Güneşli
- Hacıibrahim
- Hacımehmet
- Hamitköy
- Hayrioğlu
- Hörmetli
- İkiyaka
- İkizler
- Kabalar
- Kabalarsökü
- Karabey
- Karşıyaka
- Kayaelması
- Keloğlu
- Korupınar
- Köroğlu
- Köseköy
- Kuzluk
- Örtülü
- Özbaşı
- Özlüce
- Sakalar
- Salıcıoğlu
- Soğukpınar
- Sökü
- Şamalı
- Şamaoğlu
- Şeyhömer
- Taşburun
- Taşoluk
- Toklukaya
- Uğrak
- Uluköy
- Uluyol
- Üçevler
- Üçlüce
- Yamaç
- Yaztepe
- Yolüstü
- Yukarıçaylı
- Yukarıköy
- Yunusköy
- Yuvacık
