= Tasuj District (Shabestar County) =

District in East Azerbaijan province, Iran

Tasuj District Persian: بخش تسوج
- District
- Location within Iran
- Coordinates: 38°16′N 45°21′E
- Country: Iran
- Province: East Azerbaijan
- County: Shabestar
- Established: 1996
- Capital: Tasuj

Population (2016)
  - Total: 18,842
- Time zone: UTC+3:30 (IRST)

Tasuj District (Persian: بخش تسوج) (Note: Formerly Anzab District (بخش انزاب)) is in Shabestar County, East Azerbaijan province, Iran. Its capital is the city of Tasuj.

== Demographics ==
=== Population ===
At the time of the 2006 National Census, the district's population was 18,708 in 5,440 households. The following census in 2011 counted 18,046 people in 5,736 households. The 2016 census measured the population of the district as 18,842 inhabitants in 6,458 households.

=== Administrative divisions ===
Tasuj District Population
| Administrative divisions | 2006 | 2011 | 2016 |
|---|---|---|---|
| Chehregan RD | 3,509 | 3,171 | 2,981 |
| Guney-ye Gharbi RD | 7,867 | 7,505 | 8,339 |
| Tasuj (city) | 7,332 | 7,370 | 7,522 |
| Total | 18,708 | 18,046 | 18,842 |
RD = Rural District
