= Darius (given name) =

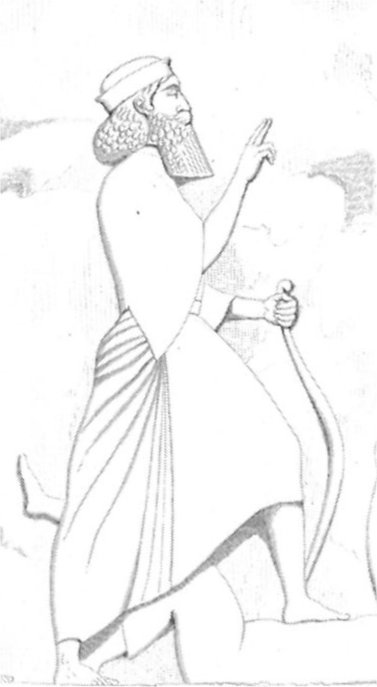
- Darius I of the Persian Empire
- Pronunciation: /dəˈraɪəs, ˈdɛəriəs/ U.K. also: /ˈdɑːr-/
- Gender: Male

Other gender
- Feminine: Daria

Origin
- Origin: Persian
- Derivation: Dariush (داریوش)
- Meaning: Holding firm the good
- Region of origin: Persia

Other names
- Variant form: Darius (surname)
- Related names: Dara, Dario, Daris

Darius is an English-rendered masculine given name of Persian origin, derived from the original name Dariush (Persian: داریوش).

== Origin and meaning ==
The name's origins trace back to Old Persian: 𐎭𐎠𐎼𐎹𐎺𐎢𐏁 Dārayavauš, which is composed of 𐎭𐎠𐎼𐎹 (Dāraya-, lit. 'to hold') and 𐎺𐎢 (va(h)u-, lit. 'good'), meaning "holding firm the good" from Proto-Indo-European *dʰer- (lit. 'to hold') and analogous to:

- Ancient Greek: Δᾱρειαῖος (Dareiaîos)
- Imperial Aramaic: 𐡃𐡓𐡉𐡄𐡅𐡔 (Dryhwš)
- Elamite: Da-ri-(y)a-ma-u-iš
- Akkadian: Da-(a-)ri-ia-(a-)muš

Shorter forms include:

- Old Persian: 𐎭𐎠𐎼𐎹𐎢𐏁 (Dārayauš)
- Latin: Dārīus, Dārēus
- Armenian: Դարեհ (Dareh)
- Ancient Greek: Δαρεῖος (Dareîos)
- Imperial Aramaic: 𐡃𐡓𐡅𐡔 (Drwš, Drywš)
- Elamite: Da-ri-ya-(h)u-(ú-)iš
- Akkadian: Da-(a-)ri-muš
- Egyptian: Tr(w)š, Trjwš', Intr(w)š, Intrjwš
- Lycian: 𐊑𐊗𐊀𐊕𐊆𐊊𐊁𐊒𐊖 (Ñtarijeus-)

== Notable people with the given name ==
=== Historical figures ===
- Kings of the Achaemenid Empire:
  - Darius I (the Great) (521–486 BCE)
  - Darius II (Ochus) (423–404 BCE)
  - Darius III (Codomannus) (336–330 BCE)
- Darius (son of Xerxes I), crown prince of Persia, may have ruled briefly in 465 BC
- Darius (son of Artaxerxes II), crown prince and junior king of his father, father of Arbupales
- Darius of Pontus, Persian monarch
- Darius I of Media Atropatene (85-65 BCE), Persian prince
- Darius the Mede, Biblical king of Babylon
- Darius the Magnificent (1615-1659), Mughal prince
- Darius (praetorian prefect), Praetorian prefect of the East in 436 to 437 CE
- Darius Painter, Italian vase painter
- Darius II of Persis
- Darius, one of the sons of King Mithridates VI Eupator

=== Modern world ===
- Darius Acuff Jr. (born 2006), American basketball player
- Darius Adamczyk (born 1966), American businessman
- Darius Adams (born 1989), Bulgarian-American basketball player
- Darius Alexander (born 2000), American football player
- Darius Allen (born 1992), American football player
- Darius Anderson (born 1997), American football player
- Darius Aučyna (born 1989), Lithuanian long jumper
- Darius Baker (1845–1926), Justice of the Rhode Island Supreme Court
- Darius L. Bancroft (1819–??), American politician
- Darius Bazley (born 2000), American basketball player
- Darius Bea (1913–2001), American baseball player
- Darius Blandford (1843–1917), Canadian blacksmith
- Darius Botha (1955–2018), South African rugby union footballer
- Darius Boyd (born 1987), Australian rugby league footballer
- Darius Bradwell (born 1997), American football player
- Darius Florin Brăguși (born 1993), Romanian tennis player
- Darius Brooks (born 1963), American musician
- Darius Brown (disambiguation), multiple people
- Darius Brubeck (born 1947), American musician
- Darius Buia (born 1994), Romanian footballer
- Darius Butkus (born 1972), Lithuanian footballer
- Darius Butler (born 1986), American football player
- Darius Charles (born 1987), English footballer
- Darius Ciraco (born 1996), Canadian football player
- Darius Clark (1798–1871), American physician and politician
- Darius Clemons (born 1960), American basketball player
- Darius Cobb (1834–1919), American painter
- Darius Cooper (born 2001), American football player
- Darius N. Couch (1822–1897), American soldier
- Darius Cox (born 1983), Bermudian footballer
- Darius Crosby (1768–1818), American politician
- Darius Crouter (1827–1910), Canadian minister
- Dárius Csillag (born 1995), Hungarian footballer
- Darius Campbell Danesh (1980-2022), Scottish pop star
- Darius Paul Dassault (1882–1969), French general
- Darius Days (born 1999), American basketball player
- Darius Defoe (born 1984), British basketball player
- Darius de Haas (born 1968), American actor
- Darius Dhlomo (1931–2015), South African footballer
- Darius Dimavičius (born 1968), Lithuanian basketball player
- Darius Draudvila (born 1983), Lithuanian decathlon athlete
- Darius D'Silva (born 1998), Emirati cricketer
- Darius D'Souza (born 1989), Indian-Canadian cricketer
- Darius Durham (born 1961), American football player
- Darius Elias (1972-2021), Canadian politician
- Darius Eubanks (born 1991), American football player
- Darius Fisher, British film producer
- Darius Fleming (born 1989), American football player
- Darius Garland (born 2000), American basketball player
- Darius Goff (1809–1891), American textile manufacturer
- Darius Grala (born 1964), Polish sports car racing driver
- Darius Gray (born 1945), American religious speaker
- Darius Grigalionis (born 1977), Lithuanian swimmer
- Darius Grosu (born 2002), Romanian footballer
- Derrius Guice (born 1997), American football player
- Darius Guppy (born 1964), Anglo–Iranian businessman
- Darius Gvildys (born 1970), Lithuanian footballer
- Darius Hadley (born 1973), American football player
- Darius Haili, Papua New Guinean rugby league footballer
- Darius Hamilton (born 1993), American football player
- Darius Hanks (born 1989), American football player
- Darius D. Hare (1843–1897), American soldier
- Darius Harper (born 1997), American football player
- Darius Harris (born 1996), American football player
- Darius Helton (1954–2006), American football player
- Darius Henderson (born 1981), English footballer
- Darrius Heyward-Bey (born 1987), American football player
- Darius Hill (born 1985), American football player
- Darius Hillary (born 1993), American football player
- Darius Hodge (born 1998), American football player
- Darius Holbert (born 1974), American musician
- Darius Holland (born 1973), American football player
- Darius Ishaku (born 1954), Nigerian architect
- Darius Jackson (born 1993), American football player
- Darius James (born 1954), American author and performance artist
- Darius Jennings (born 1992), American football player
- Darius S. Jhabvala (1936–1974), Indian-American journalist
- Darius Johnson (disambiguation), multiple people
- Darius Johnson-Odom (born 1989), American basketball player
- Darius Jokarzadeh (born 1993), Welsh weightlifter
- Darius Jones (disambiguation), multiple people
- Darius Kaiser (born 1961), Polish-German cyclist
- Darius Kaleb, American actor
- Darius Kampa (born 1977), German footballer
- Darius Kasparaitis (born 1972), Lithuanian–American ice hockey player
- Darius Kazemi (born 1983), American computer programmer
- Darius Khondji (born 1955), French-Iranian cinematographer
- Darius Kilgo (born 1991), American football player
- Darius Kinsey (1869–1945), American photographer
- Darius Knight (born 1990), English table tennis player
- Darius Labanauskas (born 1971), Lithuanian darts player
- Darius Latham (born 1994), American football player
- Darius Shaquille Leonard (born 1995), American football player
- Darius Lewis (born 1999), American-Trinidadian footballer
- Darius Lukminas (born 1968), Lithuanian basketball player
- Darius Maciulevičius (born 1973), Lithuanian football midfielder
- Darius Madison (born 1994), American soccer player
- Darius Magdišauskas (born 1969), Lithuanian footballer
- Darius Makaria (born 1993), Romanian handballer
- Darius Marder (born 1973/74), American film director
- Darius Marshall (born 1989), American football player
- Darius Martin (born 1999), American professional wrestler
- Darius Maskoliūnas (born 1971), Lithuanian basketball player
- Darius Mažintas (born 1982), Lithuanian politician
- Darius Msagha Mbela, Kenyan politician
- Darius McCollum (born 1965), American bus driver
- Darius McCrary (born 1976), American actor
- Darius McGhee (born 1999), American basketball player
- Darius Mead (1787–1864), American politician
- Darius Mead (Michigan politician) (1798–1859), American politician
- Darius Miceika (born 1983), Lithuanian footballer
- Darius Miles (born 1981), American basketball player
- Darius Milhaud (1892–1974), French composer
- Darius Miller (born 1990), American basketball player
- Darius Miller (railroad executive) (1859–1914), American railway executive
- Darius Ogden Mills (1825–1910), American banker and philanthropist
- Darius Juozas Mockus (born 1965), Lithuanian entrepreneur
- Darius Clark Monroe (born 1980), American writer
- Darius A. Monsef IV (born 1981), American entrepreneur
- Darius Moon (1851–1939), American architect
- Darius A. Moore (1833–1905), American merchant and politician
- Darius Morris (1991–2024), American basketball player
- Darius Muasau (born 2001), American football player
- Darius Mutamba (born 1991), Zimbabwean visual artist
- Darius Nggawa (1929–2008), Indonesian bishop
- Darius A. Ogden (1813–1889), American lawyer and politician
- Darius Olaru (born 1998), Romanian footballer
- Darius Osei (born 1996), English footballer
- Darius Paul (born 1994), American basketball player
- Darius Perkins (1964–2019), Australian actor
- Darius Perry (born 1999), American basketball player
- Darius Phillips (born 1996), American football player
- Darius Philon (born 1994), American football player
- Darius Powe (born 1994), American football player
- Darius Prince (born 1990), American football player
- Darius Quimby (died 1791), American police officer
- Darius Rafat (born 1977), Canadian producer
- Darius Regelskis (born 1976), Lithuanian footballer
- Darius Rejali (born 1959), Iranian-American political scientist
- Darius Reynaud (born 1984), American football player
- Darius Reynolds (born 1989), American football player
- Darius Rice (born 1982), American basketball player
- Darius Rochebin (born 1966), Iranian-Swiss journalist
- Darius Rose (born 1985), Canadian actor and Drag Artist known as Jackie Cox
- Darius Roy (born 1998), American basketball player
- Darius Rucker (born 1966), American musician
- Darius Rush (born 2000), American football player
- Dárius Rusnák (born 1959), Slovak ice hockey player
- Darius Ruželė (born 1968), Lithuanian chess player
- Darius Saint-Robinson (born 1991), American football player
- Darius Sanajevas (born 1977), Lithuanian footballer
- Darius Sanders (born 1983), American football player
- Darius Scholtysik (born 1966), German footballer
- Darius Scott (born 1993), American singer-songwriter
- Darius Semaña (born 1973), Filipino guitarist
- Darius Sessions (1717–1809), British politician
- Darius Shu (born 1994), British cinematographer
- Darius Šilinskis (born 1984), Lithuanian basketball player
- Darius Sinathrya (born 1985), Swiss-Indonesian actor
- Darius Sirtautas (born 1970), Lithuanian basketball player
- Darius Škarnulis (born 1977), Lithuanian race walker
- Darius Slay (born 1991), American football player
- Darius Slayton (born 1997), American football player
- Darius S. Smith (1833–1913), American politician
- Darius Songaila (born 1978), Lithuanian basketball player
- Darius Stills (born 1998), American football player
- Darius Strolė (born 1974), Lithuanian cyclist
- Darius Taylor (born 1978), American basketball coach
- Darius Theus (born 1990), American basketball player
- Darius Thompson (born 1995), American basketball player
- Darius Vâlcov (born 1977), Romanian politician
- Darius Van Arman, American businessman
- Darius van Driel (born 1989), Dutch golfer
- Darius Vassell (born 1980), English footballer
- Darius Victor (born 1994), American football player
- Darius Vinnett (born 1984), American football player
- Darius Walker (born 1985), American football player
- Darius B. Warner (1832–1917), American army officer
- Darius Washington Jr. (born 1985), Macedonian-American basketball player
- Darius Washington (Canadian football) (born 2000), American football player
- Darius Watts (born 1981), American football player
- Darius White (born 1992), American football player
- Darius Williams (born 1998), American football player
- Darius Young (1938–2021), American sharpshooter
- Darius Yuen (born 1969), Hong Kong banker
- Darius Zagorskis (born 1969), Lithuanian chess Grandmaster
- Darius Žutautas (born 1978), Lithuanian footballer

== Fictional characters with the name ==
- Darius (Highlander), an Immortal from Highlander: The Series
- Darius, a character from Fullmetal Alchemist
- Darrius, a character from Mortal Kombat
- Darius, a character from Need for Speed: Carbon
- Darius, the Hand of Noxus, a playable champion character in the multiplayer online battle arena video game League of Legends
- Darius, a character from The Hunger Games
- Darius, the wolf character from the Patrick Carman books The Land of Elyon
- Darius Britt, the female main character from Safety Not Guaranteed
- Darius, main character from Party Hard (video game)
- Darius, character from the Assassin's Creed franchise
- Darius, character from the TV show Atlanta (TV series)
- Darius Bowman, the main protagonist from the Netflix TV series Jurassic World Camp Cretaceous and Jurassic World: Chaos Theory
- Darius Kincade, a character from The Hitman's Bodyguard
- Darius Silva Ganius, prime minister from the Mushoku Tensei
- Darius, character from The Owl House (TV series)

== See also ==
- Darius (horse) (1951–1968), British Thoroughbred racehorse
- Derius, given name
- Dara, Darab, the New Persian forms of the word
- Daria (given name)
- Dario, given name
- Daris, given name
