= Dehdari =

Dehdari, Deh Dari or Deh-e-Dari (Persian: دهداری) may refer to:

- Dehdari, Bushehr, a village in Iran
- Dehdari, Fars, a village in Iran
- Dehdari, Shiraz, a village in Fars Province, Iran
- Dehdari Mashhad F.C., an Iranian football club
- Parviz Dehdari (1935–1992), Iranian football player and coach

== See also ==
- Dari (disambiguation)
- Deri (disambiguation)
