= Darius =

Darius may refer to:

== People ==
- Darius (given name), including a list of people and characters with the given name
- Darius (surname)

== Arts and entertainment ==
- Darius (album), a 1974 live album by Graham Collier
- Darius (series), a video game series
  - Darius (video game), the first game in the series
- Darius Films, a film production company based in Toronto and Los Angeles

== Other uses ==
- Darius (horse), a racehorse
- Darius oil field, near Kharg Island, Iran

== See also ==
- Dharius, Mexican rapper
- Dariuss, a 2023 film
- Darius II (disambiguation)
- Daria (disambiguation)
- Dara (disambiguation), Persian form of the name
- Dario (disambiguation), counterpart of Darius in Persian, Italian, Spanish, Portuguese and Croatian
