= Dariush =

- Pronunciation: [dɒːɾˈjuːʃ]
- Gender: Male

Origin
- Origin: Persian
- Derivation: 𐎭𐎠𐎼𐎹𐎺𐎢𐏁 (Dārayavauš)
- Meaning: Holding firm the good
- Region of origin: Persia

Other names
- Variant form: Darius (given name)
- Related names: Darius (surname), Dara, Dario, Daris, Daria

Dariush (Persian: داریوش), also spelled Darioush, Daryoush, or Daryoosh, is a Persian-language masculine given name. It is composed of Dāraya- (lit. 'to hold') and vash- (lit. 'good'), meaning holding firm the good.

Within the Achaemenid dynasty, three rulers of the Persian Empire held the name: Darius the Great (or Darius I), Darius II, and Darius III. It went on to enjoy considerable popularity as a given name among Persian noblemen in later periods. Historically, the name has been transliterated into Latin and later into English as "Darius" and is well known to the Western world in this form.

== Etymology ==
The Modern Persian داریوش Dāriūsh, Latin Dārīus, Dārēus, Greek Δαρεῖος Dareîos, Aramaic drwš, drywš, Elamite Da-ri-ya-(h)u-(ú-)iš, Akkadian Da-(a-)ri-muš, Egyptian tr(w)š, trjwš, intr(w)š, intrjwš, Lycian Ñtarijeus-, and Old Persian Dārayauš, are short forms of Old Pers. 𐎭𐎠𐎼𐎹𐎺𐎢𐏁 Dārayavauš, (Greek Dareiaîos, Aramaic dryhwš, Elamite Da-ri-(y)a-ma-u-iš, Akkadian Da-(a-)ri-ia-(a-)muš). The longer Old Persian Dārayavauš is composed of Dāraya- [hold] + va(h)u- [good], meaning "holding firm the good".

== People ==
- Beneil Dariush (born 1989), Assyrian-American professional mixed martial artist
- Dariush Arjmand (born 1944), Iranian actor
- Dariush Ashoori (born 1938), Iranian intellectual
- Dariush (singer) (AKA Dariush) (born 1951), Iranian pop singer
- Dariush Forouhar (1928–1998), leader of the nationalist Mellat Iran party
- Dariush Homayoon (1928–2011), Iranian politician
- Dariush Lotfi (born 2001), Austrian diver
- Dariush Mehrjui (1939–2023), Iranian film director
- Dariush Mostafavi (1944–2025), Iranian footballer
- Dariush Mozaffarian (born 1969), Iranian-American medical researcher
- Dariush Safvat (1928–2013), Persian ethnomusicologist
- Dariush Shayegan (1935–2018), Iranian academic
- Roosh V (AKA Daryush "Roosh V" Valizadeh) (born 1976), controversial American pickup artist

== See also ==
- Darius, an English transliteration/spelling
- Daris, a transliteration/spelling in Germanic and Slavic languages
