= Marchenko =

Marchenko and Martchenko (Ukrainian: Марченко) is a Ukrainian surname of the following people:

- Alexey Marchenko (born 1992), Russian ice hockey defenceman
- Anatoly Marchenko (1938–1986), Russian author
- Daria Marchenko, Ukrainian artist
- Grigori Marchenko (born 1959), Kazakh financier
- Illya Marchenko (born 1987), Ukrainian tennis player
- Ivan Marchenko (disambiguation), several people
  - Ivan the Terrible (Treblinka guard) (1911–1943), Ukrainian Treblinka guard
- Kirill Marchenko (born 2000), Russian ice hockey winger
- Lyudmila Marchenko, Soviet film actress
- Maksym Marchenko (born 1983), Ukrainian colonel and the current governor of Odesa Oblast
- Michael Martchenko (born 1942), Canadian illustrator
- Oleksiy Marchenko (died 1921), Ukrainian military commander
- Serhiy Marchenko, Minister of Finance of Ukraine
- Vladimir Marchenko (gymnast) (born 1952), Russian Olympic athlete
- Volodymyr Marchenko (1922–2026), Soviet-Ukrainian mathematician
- Yevgeny Marchenko, several people

== See also ==
- Surnames derived from the name Mark
