= Dara (disambiguation) =

Dara is a given name in several languages.

Dara, Daraa, or DARA may also refer to:

== Geography ==
=== Africa ===
- Dar'a, region in northern Ethiopia
- Dara (woreda), region in southern Ethiopia

=== Asia ===
- Dara (Mesopotamia), an archeological site in Mardin province, Turkey
- Dara, Iran, a village in East Azerbaijan Province, Iran
- Daraa Governorate, province of Syria
- Daraa, capital city of the Daraa Governorate

=== Europe ===
- Dara, Greece, community in Arcadia, Greece
- Dara, a village in Pietroasele Commune, Buzău County, Romania
- Dara, a village in Dorolț Commune, Satu Mare County, Romania
- Daranak, Armenia, also called Dara

== Film and entertainment ==
- Dara (film), a 2007 Indonesian short film
  - Macabre (film), a 2009 Indonesian film based on the short film Dara
- Dara of Jasenovac a Serbian historical drama film
- Dara (game) West African strategy game
- Dara, a fictional villain in the 1996 Indian film Diljale, portrayed by Amrish Puri

== People ==
- Dara clan, a clan of Jats in India
- Dara (South Korean singer) (born 1984), singer and actress best known as Sandara Park
- Dara (Bulgarian singer) (born 1998), winner of the Eurovision Song Contest 2026
- Dara (Moldovan singer), born Nicoleta Darabană in 1993
- Dara (wrestler) (born 1969), Japanese professional wrestler best known as Kaoru

=== Family name ===
- Chan Dara (born 1986), Cambodian footballer
- Daoyod Dara (born 1954), Thai-Vietnamese football player
- DJ Dara (Darragh Guilfoyle), Irish drum and bass DJ in America
- Dur-e Najaf Dara (born 1945), Australian restaurateur
- Eszter Dara (born 1990), Hungarian swimmer
- Evan Dara, American novelist
- Isavella Dara, Greek and French model and beauty contestant
- Kazi Abdul Wadud Dara, Bangladeshi politician
- Olu Dara (born Charles Jones III, 1941) American cornetist, guitarist, and singer
- Sofia Dara (born 1963), Greek swimmer
- Virak Dara (born Kim Hiek, 1947), Cambodian actress

== Other uses ==
- Dara (fish), a West African species of grunt Parakuhlia macropthalma
- Dara River (disambiguation)
- Dara Academy, a school in Thailand
- MV Dara, an ocean liner
- Decreasing absolute risk aversion

== Acronyms ==
- DARA International, non-profit organization working to improve development aid and humanitarian aid
- Defence Aviation Repair Agency, in the United Kingdom
- Deutsche Agentur für Raumfahrtangelegenheiten, an agency that was merged into the German Aerospace Center

== See also ==
- Darragh, Irish name
- Darius (disambiguation), English variant of the Persian "Dara"
