= Dariya =

Dariya may refer to:

- Daria (name), a female given name
- Alternative spelling of Diriyah, a town in Saudi Arabia
  - Diriyah Governorate, the governorate where the town is located
- Darija, a term used by North Africans to refer to Maghrebi Arabic
- Dariya Dil, a 1988 Bollywood family drama film
- Dariya Sahab, an Indian Saint of 17th Century

== See also ==
- Daria (disambiguation)
- Darja, a term used by North Africans to refer to Maghrebi Arabic
