= Deri =

Deri may refer to:

== People ==
- Aryeh Deri (born 1959), an Israeli politician
- Frances Deri (1880–1971), an Austrian psychoanalyst
- Miksa Déri (1854–1938), a Hungarian electrical engineer
- Shlomo Deri (fl. 2000s), an Israeli politician
- Yehuda Deri (fl. 1990s/2000s), an Israeli rabbi

== Other uses ==
- Deri, Caerphilly, a village in South Wales
  - Deri RFC, a rugby club
- Afon Deri, a river in Mid Wales
- Digital Enterprise Research Institute (DERI), Ireland

== See also ==
- Dari (disambiguation)
