= Daria (disambiguation) =

Daria is an American adult animated sitcom.

Daria or Darya may also refer to:

== People ==
- Daria (name), people named Daria or Darya
- St. Daria (died c. 283), early Christian martyr

== Other uses ==
- Amu Darya, river in Central Asia and Afghanistan
- Cyclone Daria, a 1990 European windstorm
- Daria (moth), a genus of moth
- "Daria", a song by Cake from the 1996 album Fashion Nugget
- "Daría", a song by La 5ª Estación from their 2004 album Flores de Alquiler

== See also ==
- Dario (disambiguation)
- Darius (disambiguation)
- Dari (disambiguation)
- Darina (disambiguation)
