= Daria (given name) =

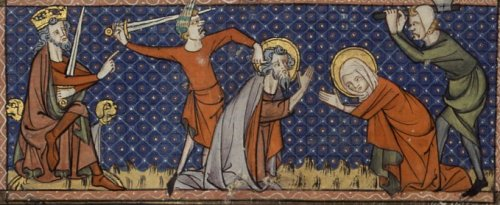
- Daria is a popular name in Slavic countries. It gained popularity due to Saint Daria, seen here being martyred with Saint Chrysanthus.
- Pronunciation: /ˈdɑːriə/ DAH-ree-ə
- Gender: Female
- Name day: July 3

Origin
- Origin: Old Persian
- Meaning: Wealthy, Sea, Feminine counterpart of Darius.
- Region of origin: Iran (Ancient Persia)

Other names
- Nicknames: Dasha, Dasia, Dolly, Dariśa
- Usage: Iran, Eastern Europe, Romania, Russia, Ukraine, Poland, Kazakhstan
- Related names: Dara, Darinka, Darissa, Dariya, Daruška, Darya, Derya, Dar'ya, Tarja

Daria or Darya is a predominantly a feminine version of the Greek name Darius. The name is derived from the Persian royal name Darayavahush, which comes from a combination of the Old Persian words daraya(miy), meaning "possess" or "maintain" and vahu, meaning "well, good." Saint Daria of Rome is a venerated martyr of the Eastern Orthodox and Roman Catholic churches, which contributed to widespread adoption of the name.

Darya is also a masculine name in Central Asian countries.

== Usage ==
In 18th-century Russia, about 4% of women had the name Daria. By the late 19th century, the name came to be seen as rustic and became associated with traditional peasant women. In the Soviet period, the name entirely went out of fashion and by 1960 almost totally disappeared. However, subsequently the popularity rebounded and increased during the late 20th century and into the 21st, so that by 2006 it was the 3rd most popular name for girls born in Moscow and Saint Petersburg (after Maria and Anastasia). In some regions of Russia it was even the 2nd most popular name. In Romania, in 2014, Daria was the 8th most popular name for baby girls.

The common Russian diminutive form of this name is Dasha (Даша). The English form "Dolly" was used as a nickname for Darya in Leo Tolstoy's "Anna Karenina."

In Ukraine, Dasha is also used as a diminutive form, but there are multiple other forms that are used for the name Daria in Ukraine, amongst others: Odarka, Daryna, Darusia, Darochka.

== Spelling variants ==
- Dārā Persian
- Dareia Late Greek
- Daria Latinized Late Greek, Italian, Polish, Romanian, Spanish & English
- Darija Croatian, Macedonian, Lithuanian & Serbian
- Darinka Slovene
- Dariya Ukrainian & Bulgarian
- Darya Belarusian
- Däria Kazakh
- Darja Czech, Latvian & Slovene
- Daruška Czech
- Derya Turkish and Kurdish
- Daryna Ukrainian
- Tarja Finnish

== Women ==
- Daria Abramowicz (born 1987), Polish sports psychologist
- Daria Atamanov (born 2005), Israeli European champion and Olympic rhythmic gymnast
- Daria Bijak (born 1985), German gymnast
- Daria de Pretis (born 1956), Italian judge
- Daria Dmitrieva (born 1993), Russian rhythmic gymnast
- Dariya Nikitichna Dobroczajeva (1916–1995), Ukrainian botanist and university teacher
- Darya Domracheva (born 1986), Belarusian biathlete
- Daria Dolan, American business news anchor, author and radio host
- Darya Dugina (1992–2022), Russian journalist and activist
- Daria Gaiazova (born 1983), Russian-Canadian cross-country skier
- Daria Gamsaragan (1907–1986), Egyptian-born Armenian visual artist, writer
- Daria Gavrilova (born 1994), Russian-Australian tennis player
- Darya Gredzen (born 2004), Russian ice hockey player
- Daria Halprin (born 1948), American psychologist, author, dancer and former actress
- Daria Hazuda, American biochemist
- Daria Hodder, Australian professional wrestler
- Daria Joura (born 1990), Russian-Australian gymnast
- Daria Kasatkina (born 1997), Russian tennis player
- Daria Klimentová (born 1971), Czech ballet dancer and teacher
- Darya Klishina (born 1991), Russian long jumper and model
- Daria Kondakova (born 1991), Russian rhythmic gymnast
- Daria Kozlova, Russian curler
- Darya Kustova (born 1986), Belarusian tennis player
- Daria Lorenci (born 1976), Croatian actress
- Daria Marchenko, Ukrainian artist
- Daria Nauer (born 1966), retired Swiss long-distance runner
- Daria Nekrasova (born 1991), Belarusian-American actress and podcaster
- Daria Nicolodi (1950–2020), Italian actress and screenwriter
- Daria Obratov (born 1989), Croatian luger
- Daria O'Neill (born 1971), American radio and television personality
- Daria Onysko (born 1981), Polish sprint athlete
- Daria Pratt (1859–1938), former American golfer
- Darya Pchelnik (born 1980), Belarusian hammer thrower
- Daria Pikulik (born 1997), Polish track cyclist
- Darya Pishchalnikova (born 1985), Russian discus thrower
- Darya Poverennova (born 1972), theatre and film actress
- Daria Sadkova (born 2008), Russian figure skater
- Darya Safonova (born 1980), Russian sprinter
- Darya Saltykova (disambiguation)
- Daria Semegen (born 1946), American composer
- Darja Semenistaja (born 2002), Latvian tennis player
- Daria Serova (born 1982), Russian freestyle skier
- Darya Shipilova (1997/1998–2026), Russian researcher who died of suspected pneumonic plague
- Daria Shkurikhina (born 1990), Russian gymnast
- Daria Spiridonova (born 1998), Russian artistic gymnast
- Daria Strokous (born 1990), Russian model and film actress
- Daria Timoshenko (born 1980), Russian-Azerbaijani figure skater
- Daria Trofimova (born 2005), Russian swimmer
- Daria Trubnikova (born 2003), Russian rhythmic gymnast
- Tarja Turunen (born 1977), Finnish singer
- Daria Usacheva (born 2006), Russian figure skater
- Darja Varfolomeev (born 2006), German rhythmic gymnast
- Daria Varlamova, Australian pageant titleholder
- Daria Veledeeva, Russian fashion editor
- Darja Vidmanova (born 2003), Czech tennis player
- Daria Virolaynen (born 1989), Russian biathlete
- Daria Werbowy (born 1983), Canadian-Ukrainian model
- Daria Widawska (born 1977), Polish actress
- Daria Willis, American academic administrator and historian
- Daria Yurlova (born 1992), Estonian biathlete
- Daria Zawiałow (born 1992), Polish singer-songwriter
- Daria Zuravicki (born 1985), American figure skater
- Daria Zhukova (born 1981), Russian fashion designer

== Men ==
- Darya Imad Shah, a 16th century Asian sultan
- Darya Singh (born 1947), Indian equestrian

=== Middle name ===
- Adrianna Daria Topolnicka (born 1999), Polish middle-distance runner

== Fictional characters ==
- Daria Morgendorffer, title character of the MTV animated series Daria (1997–2002)
- Daria, main female character in the 1970s movie Zabriskie Point
- Princess Daria from the 2002 film The Princess and the Pea
