= Daris =

Male given name

دَآرِس
- Romanization: Dāris
- Pronunciation: [ˈdaː.ris]
- Gender: Male
- Language: Arabic, Persian

Other gender
- Feminine: Daria

Origin
- Language: Arabic

Other names
- Alternative spelling: Darris
- Variant form: Darius

Daris, also spelled Darris, (Arabic: دارس), is a male given name and a surname with multiple origins.

As a given name, Daris is of Arabic origin. In Arabic, it is derived from the root d-r-s (درس) which relates to the concept of studying, learning, and lessons.

The name is popular in the Balkans, particularly in Albania, Bosnia and Herzegovina, and Croatia. Its popularity in Bosnia and Herzegovina is likely due to its similarity to previously popular names, such as Haris and Faris. In Croatia, it is likely a modification of the previously popular name Dario.

== Given name ==
- Daris Swindler (1925–2007), American anthropologist
- Darris Love (born 1980), American actor
- Darris Kilgour, professional lacrosse player and coach
- Darris McCord (1933–2013), American football player

== Surname ==
- Joan Darris, fictional character, protagonist of The Rainbow Cadenza

== See also ==
- Dario (disambiguation), counterpart of Daris in Italian, Spanish and Portuguese
- Darius (given name), a transliteration/spelling in some languages
