= Tarja (given name) =

- Gender: female

Other names
- Related names: Darja, Darija, Daria, Darya

Tarja is a Finnish feminine given name. It is the Finnish spelling of the name Daria. Notable people with the name include:

- Tarja Cronberg (born 1943), Finnish politician
- Tarja Filatov (born 1963), Finnish politician
- Tarja Halonen (born 1943), Finnish politician and President of Finland (2000–2012)
- Tarja Knuuttila, Finnish philosopher of science
- Tarja Laitiainen, Finnish diplomat
- Tarja Liljeström (born 1946), Finnish diver
- Tarja Owens, Irish mountain biker and road racer
- Tarja Salmio-Toiviainen (1917–2001), Finnish architect
- Tarja Turunen (born 1977), Finnish singer
- Tarja-Tuulikki Tarsala (1937–2007), Finnish film actress

== See also ==
- Taija
