= Darina =

Darina may refer to:

- Darina (singer), Mexican singer-songwriter, record producer, politician, activist, voice actress and former professional soccer player
- Darina (given name), South Slavic feminine given name

== See also ==
- Daria (disambiguation)
