= Dari (disambiguation) =

Dari is used as the name for a variety of Persian spoken in Afghanistan, and is also used more broadly as a name for New Persian, describing all contemporary varieties of Persian.

Dari may also refer to:

== People ==
- Achraf Dari (born 1999), a Moroccan footballer
- Dari Alexander (born 1969), American TV news anchor
- Dari Nowkhah (born 1976), American TV sports anchor
- Dari Taylor (born 1944), British politician

== Places ==
- Dari, Iran
- Dari, Jharkhand, India
- Dari County, or Darlag County, Qinghai province, China

== Other uses ==
- Dari, or dhurrie, a thin flat-woven rug or carpet used traditionally in South Asia as floor-coverings
- Dari, or dhari, dancer's headdress featured on the Torres Strait Islander flag
- DARI, dopamine reuptake inhibitor, a drug
- Dari, a name for commercial sorghum
- Dari (band), an Italian music group
- Zoroastrian Dari language, an ethnolect of the Zoroastrians of Yazd and Kerman, Iran
- Dari Mart, a chain of convenience stores in Oregon, U.S.

== See also ==
- Daria (disambiguation)
- Deri (disambiguation)
- Daris, a male given name
- Dary, a given name and surname
