= Darius Williams =

Darius Williams may refer to:

- Darius Williams (defensive back) (born 1998), American football player
- Darius Williams (linebacker) (born 1996), American football player

== See also ==
- Darious Williams (born 1993), American football cornerback
