= Tarja =

Tarja may refer to:

- Tarja (given name)
- Tarja (album), a 2004 album by German neofolk group Sonne Hagal
- Tarja (folk poetry contest), a Bengal folk poetry contest
- Tarja (island), an Estonian island
