= Operación Triunfo (Mexican TV series) =

Mexican TV series

Operación Triunfo is the Mexican version of the Spanish TV series Operación Triunfo based on the international franchise Star Academy.

== Season 1 (2002) ==
Only one sole edition was broadcast in 2002 on Televisa. The sole season was hosted by Jaime Camil and the winner of the reality contest was Darina Márquez, becoming the first winner ever of a reality musical competition in Latin American history.

The jury was made up of:

- Jaime Almeida: specialist, musical producer, conductor
- Karen Guindi: compositor, Musical producer, conductor
- Kiko Marti: musical producer and photographer
- Manuel Calderón: musical director

The teachers were:

- Patricia Reyes Spíndola: Academy director
- Elena Lara: Academy coordinator
- Fernando Lima: vocal coach
- Jack Jackson: vocal techniques and interpretation
- Víctor Manuel Ramos: vocal projection
- Vico Rubín: interpretation and style
- Marius Biegai: body expression
- Verónica Falcón: choreographer, dance and movement
- Rodolfo Ayala: dance and assistant choreographer
- Pat Gordon: English pronunciation
- Tere Ambé: spinning
- Amado Cavazos: yoga
- Sebastian Tapie: "traveler", meditation

=== Contestants / results ===
The following table shows the names and backgrounds of the contestants, and the place occupied in the competition.

Contestant	Origin	Status
Darina	Pachuca, Hidalgo	First winner
Lizette	Ciudad Valles, San Luis Potosí	Second winner
Miguel Inzunza	Querétaro, Querétaro	Third winner
Mauricio Martínez	Monterrey, Nuevo León	4th finalist
Nadia Yuriar	Culiacán, Sinaloa	5th finalist
Rodrigo Arizpe	Saltillo, Coahuila	6th finalist
Mar Contreras	Culiacán, Sinaloa	10th elimination
Yadira	Culiacán Sinaloa	9th elimination
Daniel Piloto	Pachuca, Hidalgo	8th elimination
Jesús Falcón	Macuspana, Tabasco	7th elimination
Judith Leyva	Hermosillo, Sonora	6th elimination
Pako Madrid	Los Mochis, Sinaloa	5th elimination
Ana Valeria (Anaís)	Cuautla, Morelos	4th elimination
Ángel	Guadalajara, Jalisco	3rd elimination
Josué Bravo	Cholula, Puebla	2nd elimination
Gaby Marín	México, DF	1st elimination
Martha King	Culiacán, Sinaloa	Abandoned

Originally only 16 Academy students were planned, but Martha King was also included with the gala shows.

No further seasons were made in Mexico. As of March 2020, there is no announcement regarding a reboot.
