= Derrius =

Derrius is a given name. Notable people with the name include:

- Derrius Brooks (born 1988), American football player
- Derrius Guice (born 1997), American football player
- Derrius Quarles, American social entrepreneur, human rights activist, recording artist, and writer
- Derrius Thompson (born 1977), American football player

== See also ==
- Derius, given name
