= Velo de novia =

Television series

- Genre: Telenovela
- Created by: María Antonieta Gutiérrez
- Written by: Marcia del Río
- Story by: Caridad Bravo Adams
- Directed by: Sergio Cataño; Sergio Jimenez
- Starring: Susana González; Eduardo Santamarina; Héctor Suárez; Cynthia Klitbo; Marlene Favela; Blanca Guerra
- Opening theme: "De corazón a corazón" performed by Darina; "Más que tu amigo" performed by Marco Antonio Solís
- Country of origin: Mexico
- Original language: Spanish
- No. of episodes: 135

Production
- Executive producer: Juan Osorio
- Producer: Ramón Ortiz
- Production locations: Veracruz, Mexico
- Cinematography: Antonio Acevedo
- Editor: Ricardo Rodríguez

Original release
- Network: Canal de las Estrellas
- Release: June 30, 2003 – January 2, 2004

Velo de novia (English: The Bride's Veil) is a Mexican telenovela produced by Juan Osorio for Televisa in 2003. It aired on Canal de las Estrellas from June 30, 2003 to January 2, 2004. The telenovela stars Susana González, Eduardo Santamarina, Héctor Suárez, Cynthia Klitbo, Marlene Favela and Blanca Guerra.

The 1st part is based on 1969 Brazilian telenovela Véu de Noiva and it's an adaptation of the 1971 Mexican telenovela of the same name . The 2nd part is based on the 1991 Mexican telenovela Yo no creo en los hombres.

== Plot ==
Andrea (Susana González) is a young and beautiful woman, with a strong will to live even though her life expectancy is short; she suffers from a potentially fatal heart condition.

She works as a seamstress at a clothing factory. One day she is assigned to make a bridal veil for Raquela Villaseñor del Moral (Cynthia Klitbo), the factory owner’s daughter, who is engaged to José Manuel del Álamo Sánchez (Eduardo Santamarina), a famous cyclist.

Fate will make this veil, created with much love and dedication, to eventually belong to Andrea. José Manuel realizes too late that whom he truly loves is Ángeles (Marlene Favela), Raquela’s sister. Ángeles loves him too, but she is very aware that their love is impossible.

Ángeles suffers a fatal accident at the same time that Andrea has a heart attack. Ángeles is an organ donor, and Andrea's life is saved when she becomes the recipient of Ángeles' heart. After losing his true love, José Manuel’s personality changes drastically; he is no longer the happy and cheerful young man that he used to be.

Yet he gets another chance at love when he meets Andrea, who has always admired him as an internationally renowned champion athlete. Soon they fall in love. He does not know that she received Ángeles' heart.

Raquela comes to suspect and fear that the ghost of her sister still lives on in Andrea’s new heart and that it has returned to steal José Manuel from her again. Meanwhile, Azael Villaseñor (Héctor Suárez), Raquela's father, is pressuring José Manuel to fulfill his promise to marry her.

Andrea is unsure whether José Manuel loves her for who she is or for the heart that once belonged to Ángeles. Despite this and many other obstacles, they decide to get married. At the wedding ceremony, Ricarda (Blanca Guerra), José Manuel’s mother, full of hatred for Andrea, pulls out a gun, intending to kill her right at the altar.

She takes aim and shoots, but the bullet meant for Andrea hits José Manuel instead. He dies at the altar, in Andrea’s arms. A grieving Andrea, wanting to start anew, moves to Guadalajara joined by her loyal and trusted friend Vida, (Niurka Marcos). They move back to Mexico City, After Her mom home is accidentally burned by a candle. Unbeknownst to Andrea, Raquela is living with an aunt.

One day, Andrea has a mishap on the street, and that is when she meets Jorge Robleto (also played by Eduardo Santamarina). She is shocked by his uncanny resemblance to José Manuel. Although Andrea no longer believes in love, she begins to fall for Jorge.

She is unaware that Raquela has met him already and plans to win his love at all costs. This will now bring even more suffering to Andrea. Still, fate will intervene to ensure that the veil is worn by its deserving owner.

== Cast ==
1st part

- Susana González as Andrea Paz González
- Eduardo Santamarina as José Manuel del Álamo Sánchez
- Cynthia Klitbo as Raquela Villaseñor del Moral
- Héctor Suárez as Azael Villaseñor: Raquela, Ángeles and Juan Carlos's father
- Marlene Favela as Ángeles Villaseñor del Moral: Raquela and Juan Carlos's sister
- Blanca Guerra as Ricarda Sánchez de del Álamo: José Manuel's mother
- Julissa as Lía del Moral de Villaseñor: Raquela, Ángeles and Juan Carlos's mother
- Paquita la del Barrio as Antonia González "Mamá Grande": Andrea and Anny's grandmother
- Raymundo Capetillo as Filemón Paz: Andrea and Anny's father
- Carmen Salinas as Malvina González: Andrea and Anny's mother
- Jorge Poza as Rafael Sosa/Ernesto Sosa: Twin brothers
- Roberto Vander as Germán del Alamo: José Manuel, Federica and Sebastián's father
- Toño Mauri as Juan Carlos Villaseñor del Moral: Raquela and Ángeles's brother
- Alan as Isaac Carvajal
- Yuliana Peniche as Aniceta "Anny" Paz González: Andrea's sister, in love with Rafael
- Jessica Segura as Nydia
- Elizabeth Álvarez as Dulce María Salazar: Mistress of Azael
- Niurka Marcos as Vida: Andrea's friend
- Arturo Vázquez as Sebastián Paz/Sebastián del Álamo: Andrea and Anny's stepbrother, Federica and José Manuel's biological brother
- Juan Imperio as Dr. Angelo
- Alicia Fahr as Eduarda
- Moisés Suárez as Demetrio Carillo
- Joemy Blanco as Claudia Montenegro
- Lorena de la Garza as Cachita Chávez
- Mariana Sánchez as Federica del Álamo Sánchez: José Manuel's sister
- Juan Carlos Franzoni as Erick
- Vannya Valencia as Romina: Vida's sister
- Martha Ortiz as Doña Catalina Sosa
- Manolo Royo as Armando
- Jaime Fernández as Hernán Ocampo
- Manoella Torres as La Pecosa
- Fernando Robles as Marcelo Mejía
- Rubén Olivares as El Púas
- Sandra Montoya as Yolanda Montero
- Lucero Campos as Carmelita
- Lucía Bravo as La Leona
- Azalia as Lizárraga Ulloa
- Nora Patricia Romero as Ana Luisa Reyes
- Eric Aurioles "El Tlacua-H" as Pancho
- Emilio Fernández as Memo
- Yirelka Yeraldine as Alambrito Almanedá
- Uberto Bondoni as Aarón Montenegro
- Cynthia Urias as Jovita Luna
- Adriana Chapela as Olga
- Ricardo Margaleff as Adán
- Sergio Argueta as Teo
- Angel Enciso as Zury
- Elena Silva as Imelda
- Enrique Bermúdez as Mauro
- Juan Carilles as Javier Ortiz Insunza
- Juan M. Espadas as Isauro
- Silvio Gomagui as Nicolás Nava
- Arturo Guizar as Licenciado Yépez
- Pablo Cheng as Tequila
- Irma Dorantes as Isabel "Chabelita"
- Pablo Magallanes as Raúl
- Miguel Ángel Loyo as Leonel Carvajal
- Pietro Vannucci as Luigi
- Manuel Landeta as Román Ruiz
- Raúl Padilla "Chóforo" as Jacinto
- Raúl Magaña as Licenciado Efraín Vega
- Carlos Bonavides as himself
- Juan Verduzco
- Adriana Rojo
- Natalia Traven
- Libertad
- Carlos Probert

2nd part

- Susana González as Andrea Paz González
- Eduardo Santamarina as Jorge Robleto: José Manuel's lookalike
- Cynthia Klitbo as Raquela Villaseñor del Moral: in love with José Manuel
- Carmen Salinas as Malvina González: Andrea and Anny's mother
- Niurka Marcos as Vida: Andrea's friend
- Lilia Aragón as Enriqueta Valverde del Moral: Arturo's mother
- Humberto Elizondo as Pedro Robleto: Jorge and Alexis's father
- Imanol Landeta as Alexis Robleto: Jorge's brother
- Irma Dorantes as Isabel "Chabelita"
- Silvia Mariscal as Leticia de Robleto: Jorge and Alexis's mother
- Mónica Dossetti as Francisca "Paca" Rivero
- Claudia Silva as Virginia Mirabal de del Moral
- Miguel Pizarro as Reynaldo Portillo
- Aitor Iturrioz as Marcos Ruiz
- Bobby Larios as Beto Castell: Vida's husband
- Lorena Velázquez as Adela Mirabal: Arturo's wife, Virginia's aunt
- Isabel Martínez "La Tarabilla" as Zoila Ramírez/Belén
- José Luis Cordero as Gumaro Estrada
- Óscar Traven as Licenciado Álvaro Julio Castillo
- Amparo Garrido as Cándida
- Julio Preciado as Father Julio Monterde
- Luis Madaría as Arturo del Moral Valverde: Raquela's cousin
- Lorena Enríquez as Inés González
- Jessica Segura as Nydia
- Emilio Fernández as Guillermo "Memo"
- Roberto Marín as Hugo
- María Clara Zurita as Úrsula
- Teo Tapia as Lucio González
- Claudia Ortega as Sandra
- Vanessa Arias as Neddy
- Latin Lover as Latin
- Gabriel de Cervantes as Dr. Quintanilla
- Estrella Lugo as Gloria
- Eduardo Antonio as Dr. Eduardo Bárcenas
- Archie Lafranco as Carlos Alfredo Escobar
- Flor Procuna as Josefa "Fefa"
- Kelchie Arizmendi as Patricia
- Ángeles Alonso as Teresa
- Rebeca Manríquez as Lamara
- Andrés Puentes Jr. as Sammy
- Rebeca Mankita as Yara
- Dalilah Polanco as Aracely
- Hugo Aceves as Chato
- Juan Carlos Bonet as Arsenio López
- Raúl Castellanos as Enrique
- Queta Lavat as Socorro
- Hugo Macías Macotela as Don Filiberto Castell
- Rubén Morales as Basilio López
- Francisco Avendaño as Licenciado Galvis
- Naydelin Navarrete as Patricia
- Fátima Torre as Flavia Morales
- Lucía Pailles
- Elena Silva as Imelda Pérez
- Ramón Menéndez as Jiménez
- Erendira Zumaya as Lalita
- Arturo Guizar as Host
- Roberto Ruy as Evaristo
- Miriam Jasso as Alicia
- Shula as Marissa
- Albert Chavez as Contreras
- Pablo Cheng as Tequila
- Ileana Muñiz as Susy
- Sergio Jiménez as Juez Estévez
- Juan Carlos Novoa as Bigotes
- Mauricio Roldan as Braulio Cancino
- Carlos Balart as Tony
- Tomas García as Jaro
- Carlos Bonavides as himself
- José Miguel Checa as Dr. Molina

== Soundtrack ==
#	Title	Performed by
1.	"De Corazón a Corazón"	Darina
2.	"Vivir Así Es Morir de Amor"	Cox
3.	"El Ruletero"	Niurka Marcos
4.	"Dime Corazón"	Amaury Gutiérrez
5.	"Mala Gente"	Juanes
6.	"Quizás Quizás Quizás"	Emmanuel
7.	"La Distancia"	Cox
8.	"No Basto"	Darina
9.	"No Importa Que El Sol Se Muera"	Mœnia
10.	"Mori"	Tranzas
11.	"Si Pongo Corazón"	Rossana
12.	"Eres Todo Para Mi"	Petra Berger
13.	"Busca Un Sueño"	Alan
14.	"Corazón Caliente"	Niurka Marcos
15.	"Más que tu amigo"	Marco Antonio Solís
16.	"Dies Irae"	Wolfgang Amadeus Mozart

== Awards ==
Year	Award	Category	Nominee	Result
2004	Latin ACE Awards	Best Actress	Susana González	Won
