= Derius =

Derius is a given name. Notable people with the name include:

- Derius Davis (born 2000), American football player
- Derius Swinton II (born 1985), American football coach

== See also ==
- Darius (given name)
- Derrius, given name
