= Mark Greig =

Canadian ice hockey player (born 1970)

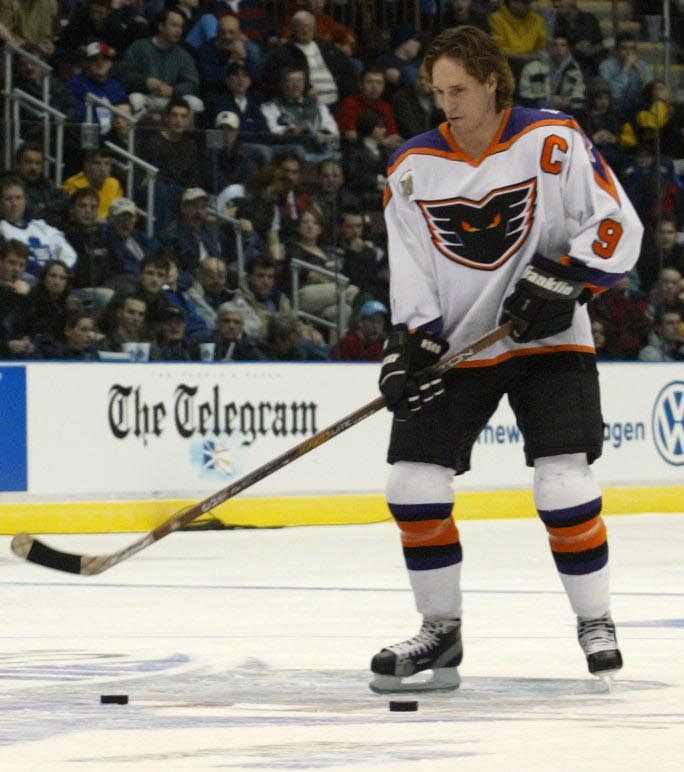
- Greig during the 2002 AHL All-Star Game
- Born: January 25, 1970 (age 56) High River, Alberta, Canada
- Height: 5 ft 11 in (180 cm)
- Weight: 190 lb (86 kg; 13 st 8 lb)
- Position: Right wing
- Shot: Right
- Played for: Hartford Whalers; Toronto Maple Leafs; Calgary Flames; Philadelphia Flyers
- NHL draft: 15th overall, 1990; Hartford Whalers
- Playing career: 1990–2007

William Mark Greig (born January 25, 1970) is a Canadian former professional ice hockey right winger who played nine seasons in the National Hockey League (NHL) for the Hartford Whalers, Toronto Maple Leafs, Calgary Flames and Philadelphia Flyers. He is currently a scout with the Flyers. He is the younger brother of former NHL player Bruce Greig.

== Playing career ==
Greig was drafted 15th overall by the Whalers in the 1990 NHL entry draft and scored 13 goals and 27 assists for 40 points in 125 games during his NHL career.

== Awards ==
- WHL East First All-Star Team (1990)
- AHL First All-Star Team (2001)

== Personal life ==
Greig and his wife Cindy have three children, two daughters Kyra and Dara and one son Ridly, a centre, who was selected in the first round by the Ottawa Senators in the 2020 NHL entry draft. His daughter, Dara, is a professional ice hockey player for the Ottawa Charge of the Professional Women's Hockey League (PWHL).

== Career statistics ==
=== Regular season and playoffs ===
			Regular season					Playoffs
Season	Team	League	GP	G	A	Pts	PIM	GP	G	A	Pts	PIM
1985–86	Blackie Bisons	AAHA	31	12	43	55	44	—	—	—	—	—
1986–87	Calgary North Stars AAA	AMHL	18	9	28	37	30	—	—	—	—	—
1986–87	Calgary Wranglers	WHL	5	0	0	0	0	—	—	—	—	—
1987–88	Lethbridge Hurricanes	WHL	65	9	18	27	38	—	—	—	—	—
1988–89	Lethbridge Hurricanes	WHL	71	36	72	108	113	8	5	5	10	16
1989–90	Lethbridge Hurricanes	WHL	65	55	80	135	149	18	11	21	32	35
1990–91	Hartford Whalers	NHL	4	0	0	0	0	—	—	—	—	—
1990–91	Springfield Indians	AHL	73	32	55	87	73	17	2	6	8	22
1991–92	Hartford Whalers	NHL	17	0	5	5	6	—	—	—	—	—
1991–92	Springfield Indians	AHL	50	20	27	47	38	9	1	1	2	20
1992–93	Hartford Whalers	NHL	22	1	7	8	27	—	—	—	—	—
1992–93	Springfield Indians	AHL	55	20	38	58	86	—	—	—	—	—
1993–94	Hartford Whalers	NHL	31	4	5	9	31	—	—	—	—	—
1993–94	Springfield Indians	AHL	4	0	4	4	21	—	—	—	—	—
1993–94	Toronto Maple Leafs	NHL	13	2	2	4	10	—	—	—	—	—
1993–94	St. John's Maple Leafs	AHL	9	4	6	10	0	11	4	2	6	26
1994–95	Saint John Flames	AHL	67	31	50	81	82	2	0	1	1	0
1994–95	Calgary Flames	NHL	8	1	1	2	2	—	—	—	—	—
1995–96	Atlanta Knights	IHL	71	25	48	73	104	3	2	1	3	4
1996–97	Quebec Rafales	IHL	5	1	2	3	0	—	—	—	—	—
1996–97	Houston Aeros	IHL	59	12	30	42	59	13	5	8	13	2
1997–98	Grand Rapids Griffins	IHL	69	26	36	62	103	3	0	4	4	4
1998–99	Philadelphia Flyers	NHL	7	1	3	4	2	2	0	1	1	0
1998–99	Philadelphia Phantoms	AHL	67	23	46	69	102	7	1	5	6	14
1999–2000	Philadelphia Phantoms	AHL	68	34	48	82	116	5	3	2	5	6
1999–2000	Philadelphia Flyers	NHL	11	3	2	5	6	3	0	0	0	0
2000–01	Philadelphia Flyers	NHL	7	1	1	2	4	—	—	—	—	—
2000–01	Philadelphia Phantoms	AHL	74	31	57	88	98	10	6	5	11	4
2001–02	Philadelphia Phantoms	AHL	66	22	37	59	105	5	0	4	4	6
2002–03	Philadelphia Flyers	NHL	5	0	1	1	2	—	—	—	—	—
2002–03	Philadelphia Phantoms	AHL	73	30	44	74	127	—	—	—	—	—
2003–04	Hamburg Freezers	DEL	52	14	23	37	44	11	5	6	11	10
2004–05	Kassel Huskies	DEL	52	17	19	36	93	7	1	2	3	18
2005–06	Iserlohn Roosters	DEL	46	21	21	42	46	—	—	—	—	—
2006–07	Iserlohn Roosters	DEL	40	13	17	30	70	—	—	—	—	—
NHL totals			125	13	27	40	90	5	0	1	1	0
AHL totals			606	247	412	659	848	66	17	26	43	98
DEL totals			190	65	80	145	253	18	6	8	14	28

Preceded by Bobby Holik	Hartford Whalers first-round draft pick 1990	Succeeded by Patrick Poulin
