= Taija =

Taija is a Finnish feminine given name. Notable people with the name include:

- Taija Finni, professor of kinesiology at the University of Jyväskylä
- Taija Jurmu, Miss Europe 1997 contestant
- Taija Tuominen (born 1962), Finnish writer and creative writing teacher
