= Darina (given name) =

Darina or Daryna (Ukrainian) is a South Slavic feminine given name. It is common in Bulgarian, Czech, Slovak, Slovenian, Ukrainian, Tatarian cultures and comes from the root Slavic element "dar" which means gift. Widely spread among the young population in Tatarstan and Bashkortostan due to its similarity with the name Zarina. There is evidence that it originally comes from the name Darius, which originally in Persian meant "one who possesses the good" or "precious"/"valuable".

People so named include:

== Darina ==
- Darina, Mexican singer Darina Márquez Uribe (born 1980)
- Darina Al Joundi (born c. 1969), Lebanese-born French stage actor
- Darina Allen (born 1948), Irish chef, food writer and TV personality
- Darina Gambošová (born 1972), birth name of Dara Rolins, Slovak singer
- Darina Laščiaková (1931 – 2026), Slovak folklore singer and ethnographer.
- Darina Mifkova (born 1974), Italian former volleyball player
- Darina Takova (born 1963), Bulgarian opera singer
- Darina Yotova (born 1998), Bulgarian pop singer Dara (Bulgarian singer)

== Daryna ==
- Daryna Apanashchenko (born 1986), Ukrainian footballer
- Daryna Bondarchuk (born 1998), Ukraining football goalkeeper
- Daryna Duda (born 2003), Ukrainian group rhythmic gymnast
- Daryna Gladun (born 1993), Ukrainian writer, artist and translator
- Daryna Kyrychenko (born 1998), Ukrainian snowboarder
- Daryna Polotniuk, 20th century Ukrainian writer
- Daryna Prystupa (born 1987), Ukrainian sprinter
- Daryna Verkhohliad (born 1992), Ukrainian rower
- Daryna Zevina (born 1994), Ukrainian swimmer
