= Darius II (disambiguation) =

Darius II was king of the Persian Empire from 423 BC to 405 or 404 BC.

Darius II may also refer to:

- Darius II of Persis (1st century AD), king of the Kingdom of Persis
- Darius II (video game)

== See also ==
- Darius (disambiguation)
