= Armenius (writer) =

Early Christian writer

Armenius (Ancient Greek: Ἄρμενιος) was an early Christian writer and priest who, along with fellow priest Virinus, wrote in Greek an account of the martyrdom of Chrysanthus and Daria, whose contemporary he appears to have been.

The Greek original has never been published, but a Latin translation was published by Laurentius Surius and compiled in the Acta Sanctorum.
