= Dary =

Dary is both a surname and a given name. Notable people with the name include:

== Surname ==
- Alan Dary, actor
- Bruno Dary (born 1952), French general

== Given name ==
- Dary John Mizelle (born 1940), American composer
- Dary (footballer) (born 1940), full name Dary Batista de Oliveira, Brazilian football midfielder
- Dary Dasuda, Nigerien boxer
- Dary Matera (born 1955), American non-fiction crime writer
- Dary Myricks (born 1976), American football offensive linemen

== See also ==
- Dari (disambiguation)
