= Dara River =

Dara River may refer to:

- Dara, a tributary of the Drăgan in Cluj County, Romania
- Dara, a tributary of the Râul Doamnei in Argeș County, Romania
- An old spelling of Draa River

== See also ==
- Dara (disambiguation)
