= 113th Ohio Infantry Regiment =

- Active: October 10, 1862, to July 6, 1865
- Country: United States
- Allegiance: Union
- Branch: Infantry
- Engagements: Tullahoma Campaign; Chickamauga Campaign; Battle of Chickamauga; Chattanooga campaign; Battle of Missionary Ridge; Knoxville Campaign; Atlanta campaign; Battle of Resaca; Battle of Dallas; Battle of New Hope Church; Battle of Allatoona; Battle of Kennesaw Mountain; Battle of Peachtree Creek; Siege of Atlanta; Battle of Jonesboro; Sherman's March to the Sea; Carolinas campaign; Battle of Bentonville

The 113th Ohio Infantry Regiment, sometimes 113th Ohio Volunteer Infantry (or 113th OVI) was an infantry regiment in the Union Army during the American Civil War.

== Service ==
The 113th Ohio Infantry was organized at: Camp Chase, Columbus; Camp Zanesville, Zanesville; and Camp Dennison near Cincinnati. The regiment—with its Companies A, B, C, and F—was mustered in for three years' service on October 10, 1862, at Camp Chase, under the command of Colonel James A. Wilcox. Companies G and D were mustered in on October 18 and 23, 1862, respectively at Camp Chase. Companies E and H were mustered in on November 10 and December 12, 1862, respectively, at Camp Zanesville. Company I, formerly a company of the 109th Ohio Infantry, was mustered in on December 1, 1862, at Camp Dennison. Lastly, Company K was mustered in between December 8, 1863, and February 29, 1864, at Rossville, Georgia.

The regiment was attached to District of Western Kentucky, Department of the Ohio, to February 1863. Reed's Brigade, Baird's Division, Army of Kentucky, Department of the Cumberland, to June 1863. 2nd Brigade, 1st Division, Reserve Corps, Department of the Cumberland, to October 1863. 2nd Brigade, 2nd Division, XIV Corps, Army of the Cumberland, to July 1865.

The 113th Ohio Infantry mustered out of service July 6, 1865, at Louisville, Kentucky.

== Detailed service ==
Moved to Louisville, Ky., December 27; then to Muldraugh's Hill, Ky., January 3, 1863, and to Nashville, Tenn., January 28. Moved from Nashville to Franklin, Tenn., February 12, 1863, and duty there until June. Tullahoma Campaign June 23-July 7. Duty at Wartrace until August 25. Chickamauga Campaign August 25-September 22. Battle of Chickamauga September 19–21. Siege of Chattanooga, Tenn., September 24-November 23. Chattanooga-Ringgold Campaign November 23–27. Orchard Knob November 23. Tunnel Hill November 24–25. Missionary Ridge November 25. Chickamauga Station November 26. March to relief of Knoxville November 28-December 8. Return to Chattanooga and duty in that vicinity until May 1864. Demonstration on Dalton, Ga., February 22–27, 1864. Tunnel Hill, Buzzard's Roost Gap, and Rocky Faced Ridge February 23–25. Atlanta Campaign May 1 to September 8. Tunnel Hill May 6–7. Demonstration on Rocky Faced Ridge May 8–11. Buzzard's Roost Gap May 8–9. Battle of Resaca May 14–15. Advance on Dallas May 18–25. Operations on line of Pumpkin Vine Creek and battles about Dallas, New Hope Church, and Allatoona Hills May 25-June 5. Operations about Marietta and against Kennesaw Mountain June 10-July 2. Pine Hill June 11–14. Lost Mountain June 15–17. Assault on Kennesaw June 27. Ruff's Station July 4. Chattahoochie River July 5–17. Peachtree Creek July 19–20. Siege of Atlanta July 22-August 25. Utoy Creek August 5–7. Flank movement on Jonesboro August 25–30. Battle of Jonesboro August 31-September 1. Operations against Forrest and Hood in northern Georgia and northern Alabama September 29-November 3. March to the sea November 15-December 10, Sandersville November 26. Siege of Savannah December 10–21. Campaign of the Carolinas January to April 1865. Two League Cross Roads, near Lexington, S.C., February 15. Taylor's Hole Creek, Averysboro, N.C., March 16. Battle of Bentonville March 19–21. Occupation of Goldsboro March 24. Advance on Raleigh April 10–14. Occupation of Raleigh April 14. Bennett's House April 26. Surrender of Johnston and his army. March to Washington, D.C., via Richmond, D.C., April 29-May 19. Grand Review of the Armies May 24. Moved to Louisville, Ky., June.

== Casualties ==
The regiment lost a total of 269 men during service; 9 officers and 110 enlisted men killed or mortally wounded, 1 officer and 149 enlisted men died of disease.

== Commanders ==
- Colonel James Andrew Wilcox - resigned April 29, 1863
- Colonel John G. Mitchell - promoted to Brigadier General, January 12, 1865; resigned July 3, 1865
- Colonel James Andrew Wilcox - transferred from 190th Regiment, O. V. I., July 1, 1865; mustered out with regiment July 6, 1865
- Lieutenant Colonel Darius B. Warner - commanded at the Battle of Chickamauga
- Major Lyne Starling Sullivant - commanded during the Chattanooga Campaign

== See also ==
- List of Ohio Civil War units
- Ohio in the Civil War
