= Dario =

Dario is a masculine given name, etymologically related to Darius.

== Given name ==
- Dario Allevi (born 1965), Italian politician
- Dario Amodei (born 1983), American entrepreneur
- Dario Antiseri (1940–2026), Italian philosopher and academic
- Dario Argento (born 1940), Italian film director
- Dario Badinelli (born 1960), Italian triple jumper
- Dario Bellezza (1944–1996), Italian poet
- Dario Benuzzi (born 1946), Italian test driver
- Darío Botero (1938–2010), Colombian writer and philosopher
- Dario Campeotto (1939–2023), Danish singer, actor, entertainer
- Dario Cologna (born 1986), Swiss cross-country skier
- Dario Dainelli (born 1979), Italian footballer
- Dario Damiani (born 1974), Italian politician
- Dario Durigan (born 1984), Brazilian lawyer and public administrator
- Dario Džamonja (1955–2001), Bosnian writer
- Dario Franchitti (born 1973), Scottish Indianapolis 500 winner and IndyCar Series champion
- Dario Fo (1926–2016), Italian Nobel prize winner
- Dario García (born 1968), Argentine judoka
- Dario Hübner (born 1967), Italian footballer
- Darío Herrera (born 1985), Argentine football referee
- Dario José dos Santos (born 1946), Brazilian footballer
- Dario Hunt (born 1989), American basketball player
- Dario Lari (born 1979), Italian rower
- Darío Lopilato (born 1981), Argentine actor
- Darío Lecman (born 1971), Argentine weightlifter
- Dario Kordić (born 1960), Bosnian Croat politician, military commander and convicted war criminal
- Dario Marianelli (born 1963), Italian film composer
- Darío Moreno (1921–1968), Turkish-born singer and composer
- Dario Parrini (born 1973), Italian politician
- Dario Resta (1882–1924), Italian-born Anglo-American Indianapolis 500 winner
- Dario Šarić (born 1994), Croatian basketball player
- Darío Silva (born 1972), former Uruguayan footballer
- Dario Šimić (born 1975), Croatian footballer
- Dario Toffenetti (1889–1962), American restaurateur
- Dario Vidošić (born 1987), Australian footballer
- Darío Villanueva (born 1950), Spanish literary critic
- Dario Vitale (born 1983), Italian fashion designer

== Fictional characters ==
- Dario, the title character of L'incoronazione di Dario, a 1717 dramma per musica by Antonio Vivaldi, and the 1686 opera L'incoronazione di Dario (Perti)
- Dario, in the animated film Wish
- Dario, criminal in the James Bond film Licence to Kill, played by Benicio Del Toro
- Dario Bossi, in the video game Castlevania: Dawn of Sorrow
- Dario, in the video game Chrono Cross
- Dario Brando, father of Dio Brando in the Japanese manga series JoJo's Bizarre Adventure
- Dario Cueto, played by Luis Fernandez-Gil in the professional wrestling television series Lucha Underground

== See also ==
- Darius (disambiguation)
- Daria (disambiguation)
- Daario Naharis
