= Darius Hadley =

American football player (born 1973)

Profile
- Position: Wide receiver

Personal information
- Born: September 9, 1973 (age 53)
- Listed height: 6 ft 2 in (1.88 m)
- Listed weight: 205 lb (93 kg)

Career information
- College: South Carolina State

Career history
- Memphis Pharaohs (1995); Florida Bobcats (1996–1998); Grand Rapids Rampage (2000); Los Angeles Avengers (2001)

Career AFL statistics
- Tackles: 227
- INT: 17
- Stats at ArenaFan.com

Darius Hadley (born September 9, 1973) is an American former professional football defensive specialist/wide receiver. He played college football at South Carolina State University.

In his six-year career, Hadley played for the Memphis Pharaohs, Florida Bobcats, Grand Rapids Rampage, and Los Angeles Avengers of the Arena Football League.
