= Shlomo Deri =

Israeli lawyer and politician

Shlomo Deri (Hebrew: שלמה דרעי) is an Israeli lawyer, businessman, politician, and founder of the Respect and Tradition Party (Kavod U’Masoret Party). He was part of Shas negotiating team that negotiated its position in the government following the 2015 Israeli legislative election. He has two older brothers Yehuda Deri and Aryeh Deri.
