= Dari, Jharkhand =

Dari
- Census Town
- Location in Jharkhand, India Dari (India)
- Coordinates: 23.71°N 85.38°E
- Country: India
- State: Jharkhand
- District: Hazaribagh

Government
  - Body: Federal democracy

Population (2011)
  - Total: 6,405

Languages (*For language details see Dadi (community development block)#Language and religion)
  - Official: Hindi, Urdu
- Time zone: UTC+5:30 (IST)
- PIN: 829109 (Gidi C)
- Telephone/ STD code: 06545
- Vehicle registration: JH 02
- Website: hazaribag.nic.in

Dari is a census town in the Dadi CD block in the Hazaribagh Sadar subdivision of the Hazaribagh district in the state of Jharkhand, India.

== Geography ==
Cities, towns and locations in Hazaribagh district in North Chotanagpur Division
Some census towns and locations around Hazaribagh city have been shown in the Hazaribagh City map
M: municipality, CT: census town, R: rural/ urban centre, T: tourist centre, D: dam, HS: hot spring
Owing to space constraints in the small map, the actual locations in a larger map may vary slightly

=== Location ===
Dari is located at 23.71°N 85.38°E.

=== Area overview ===
Hazaribagh district is a plateau area and forests occupy around about 45% of the total area. It is a predominantly rural area with 92.34% of the population living in rural areas against 7.66% in the urban areas. There are many census towns in the district, as can be seen in the map alongside. Agriculture is the main occupation of the people but with the extension of coal mines, particularly in the southern part of the district, employment in coal mines is increasing. However, it has to be borne in mind that modern mining operations are highly mechanised. Four operational areas of Central Coalfields are marked on the map. All these areas are spread across partly this district and partly the neighbouring districts.

Note: The map alongside presents some of the notable locations in the district. All places marked in the map are linked in the larger full screen map. Urbanisation data calculated on the basis of census data for CD blocks and may vary a little against unpublished official data.

== Civic administration ==
=== CD block HQ ===
The headquarters of Dadi CD block are located at Dari.

== Demographics ==
According to the 2011 Census of India, Dari had a total population of 6,405, of which 3,283 (51%) were males and 3,122 (49%) were females. Population in the age range 0–6 years was 846. The total number of literate persons in Dari was 4,348 (78.22% of the population over 6 years).

As of 2001 India census, Dari had a population of 7,382. Males constitute 52% of the population and females 48%. Dari has an average literacy rate of 62%, higher than the national average of 59.5%: male literacy is 70%, while female literacy is 52%. In Dari, 17% of the population is under 6 years of age.

== Infrastructure ==
According to the District Census Handbook 2011, Hazaribagh, Dari covered an area of 11.11 km^{2}. Among the civic amenities, it had 11 km roads with open drains, the protected water supply involved uncovered well, tapwater from treated sources and service reservoir. It had 1,091 domestic electric connections, 200 road lighting points. Among the educational facilities it had 5 primary schools, 4 middle schools, 3 secondary schools, 2 senior secondary schools. Among the social, recreational and cultural facilities, it had 1 stadium, 1 auditorium/ community hall. Three important commodities it manufactured were gate/ grill, furniture, soil item. It had the branch office of 1 nationalised bank.

== Transport ==
The Kuju-Giddi Road links this area to Kuju on National Highway 20.
