= Darragh =

Darragh, also spelled Daragh and Dara, /ˈdærə/ is a name of Irish origin. The name is derived from the Old Irish word daire (Modern Irish doire), which means "oak". Darragh is frequently used in Ireland as a masculine forename, though sometimes occurs as a surname or feminine forename. Darragh is related to the name Dáire. The spelling varies, with variations such as Dara, Daragh etc.

== People with the surname Darragh ==
- Adam Darragh (born 1979), Australian basketball player
- Archibald B. Darragh (1840–1927), American politician
- Cornelius Darragh (1809–1854), American politician
- Harold Darragh (1902–1993), Canadian ice hockey player
- Jack Darragh (1890–1924), Canadian ice hockey player
- John Darragh (1772–1828), American politician
- Lydia Darragh (1729–1789), Irish-born American Revolutionary War figure
- Paul Darragh (1953–2005), Irish equestrian
- Tina Darragh (born 1950), American poet

== People with given name Daragh ==
- Daragh Carville (born 1969) Irish playwright, screenwriter and educator
- Daragh McCarthy, Irish filmmaker and musician
- Daragh O'Malley (born 1954) Irish actor, director and producer
- Daragh Walsh (born 1997) Irish field hockey player

== People with given name Darragh ==
- Darragh Ennis (born 1979–80), Irish scientist and quizzer
- Darragh Kenny (born 1988), Irish equestrian
- Darragh Maguire (born 1976), Irish footballer
- Darragh Morgan (born 1974), Irish musician
- Darragh Mortell (born 1989) Actor/film-maker
- Darragh Ó Sé (born 1975), Irish footballer
- Darragh O'Brien (born 1974), Irish politician

== Places called Darragh ==
- Darragh, Glenroe, County Limerick
- Darragh Cross, near Saintfield, County Down, Northern Ireland. (Darragh Cross on Google Maps)
- Darragh, County Clare, Ireland (Darragh County Clare on Google Maps)
- Darra, Queensland, Australia
- Darragh, Pennsylvania, USA
- Mount Darragh NSW Australia

== See also ==
- Dara
- Storm Darragh (December 2024), in parts of northwestern Europe
