= Darius S. Jhabvala =

Indian-American journalist and diplomatic

Darius Shavaksha Jhabvala (1928-1974) was an Indian-American journalist and diplomatic correspondent for the Boston Globe. He was the first to report on the U.S. incursion into Cambodia in 1970, and later broke the news that Canada was soon to establish diplomatic relations with the People's Republic of China. He was also the first U.S. correspondent to detail the maneuvers of the Soviet navy in the Indian Ocean. Jhabvala had a British colonial accent and self-deprecating humor.

== Early life and education ==
Jhabvala was born in Bombay, India, in 1928, to a family with a rich political legacy. He was an ethnic Parsi and wrote the entry for the Parsis in the Encyclopaedia Americana. Jhabvala moved to the United States in 1947 and attended the Latin School of Chicago before earning a degree in diplomacy. He studied at the University of Bombay, Colgate University and Columbia University. He is described by Kissinger as having retained his Indian passport and feeling torn between India and the United States.

His great-grandfather was a founder of the Indian National Congress, and his family was deeply involved in Indian politics, leading Henry Kissinger to jokingly refer to him as the 'real Boston Brahmin'.

His father, Shavaksha Hormasji Jhabvala was a Persian scholar, author and a leader in India's independence movement and the founder of the All-India Trade Union movement. He covered a wide range of topics, from the intricate dynamics of prohibition to the afflictions of leprosy, from the intricacies of trade unionism to the philosophical underpinnings of the Gita. Additionally, he devoted his scholarly attention to exploring the history of the Parsees, and examining the verses of Kabir. Mr. Jhabvala's was the founder of multiple trade unions and played a central role in the infamous Meerut Conspiracy Case, which culminated in his arrested. His mother, Meher Mehta Jhabvala was a civic leader and the president of the All-India Women's Conference.

== Career ==
Jhabvala began his career working for the United Nations in New York, where he gained valuable experience in international affairs. Later, he became an instructor at the Latin American Institute in New York and an assistant editor for Newsweek.

Jhabvala was respected by his colleagues in the State Department and was considered a warm and gentle person. He served as the president of the State Department Correspondents Association, where he was known for his insightful reporting and professionalism.

Secretary of State Henry Kissinger, who praised him as a "great human being" and a "unique friend." He described his job tracking Kissinger as "trying to track sirocco. You don't know where the wind comes from, but it seems to blow away the locusts."

== Personal life and legacy ==
Darius Jhabvala married Sarica Agondo, who he met at Columbia and they had four children, Murzban, Jamasp, Tehemura, and Kirman.
