= Dariuss =

2023 British film

Dariuss is a 2023 British experimental film by Guerrilla Metropolitana. It is the director's debut feature film. The film employs techniques from splatter film, silent film, found footage, the French New Wave, and surrealist film.

== Plot ==
Dariuss tells the brutal story of a young girl who, while playing alone in a park, is filmed without her knowledge by someone and subsequently disappears. The family are shattered by the disappearance of their daughter and express their grief in their own way throughout the film.

While the film doesn't show what happens to the girl, suggestions are made that she was murdered and possibly raped. The story continues, showing a pregnant woman walking alone at night, who is alarmed by the sound of a crying newborn baby. The woman is then murdered by having her umbilical cord severed. The film continues to show different perspectives of how the family are dealing with her disappearance as well as varying realities on a London night, including a series of strange sexual drawings from a child, a mysterious individual playing with two fake rag dolls in a torchlit forest; a pair of child's underwear, along with an empty milk bottle left inside an abandoned house. The dead girl's father is seen inside his car compulsively drinking and eating chocolate while crying; the child's grandmother uses her breast milk to fill empty bottles; and the child's mother masturbates whilst looking at herself in a mirror, crying, behaving strangely, and taking barbiturates.

The film continues with the child's mother and grandmother having incestuous sexual relations with each other, while a painting of the dead child appears regularly throughout the film. Each character in this family expresses their grief in a different way through various aberrant behaviours.

The entrance of a mysterious and disturbing character with a baby-like voice, carrying a handheld camera and the severed scalp of the pregnant woman seen at the beginning of the film, breaks into the family home, marking the beginning of an indescribable nightmare of violence and madness. The child's mother is attacked whilst she is sleeping, after decapitating her, this mysterious character begins to rape her, while the child's grandmother is raped and then her innards are devoured. After contemplating suicide, the girl's father decides to return home and, after drinking the elderly woman's breast milk from the bottle, begins masturbating in front of his daughter's painting. He is then unknowingly attacked by the young maniac and devoured while his attacker films himself with a video camera. Soon afterward, it is discovered that the girl's father also had a camera tripod, thus raising the question of who is responsible for the girl's disappearance. Meanwhile, the girl appears as a ghost at the scene of the massacre, taking on the same appearance as the girl depicted in the painting. After killing the family cat, the maniac leaves the scene and heads off into the night in search of another house to break into, until he finds one where another woman will be his next victim.

== Cast ==
Actor Name	Character Played
Ila Argento	The Wife
Archibald Kane	The Husband
Guerrilla Metropolitana	The Maniac
Marie Antoinette de Robespierre	The Grandmother
Sarah Isabel	The Pregnant Woman
Medusa S	The Girl

== Controversy and reception ==
Dariuss has received numerous reviews from critics, reviewers, writers, journalists, and fan sites. Donato Totaro of the online film magazine 'Off Screen' praised the film, comparing it to The Cabinet of Dr Caligari.

Many other outlets and critics, such as Dread Central, described Dariuss as "taunting and unapologetic". Stating that there is beauty despite the graphic nature of the film. Dread Central also described the film as "a distinguishing piece of art."

Dariuss has been criticised in some countries, such as the United Kingdom and Italy, for being "bizarre" and unconventional. The film remains a highly polarising work to this day, and has been publicly screened by film students in New York and London, praised for its extraordinary originality and multilayered narrative structure.

== Production ==
The film was initially conceived as a 15-minute home invasion short in 2021, conceived while the director was in a trance-like state while listening to the psychedelic music of his former band Monoxide (later used in the film). However, Metropolitana postponed the project to focus on other work, only to resume it in 2022, working on the drafts and transforming it into a feature film. The film was shot over the course of many months, in pieces, with the director constantly changing and altering the footage based on new ideas. Initially, the exterior scenes were filmed secretly and illegally, as they were shot on other people's property without permission, and in some cases even through forced entry. Later, the scenes with Medusa S were filmed, followed by those with Marie Antoinette de Robespierre. Lead actress Ila Argento flew from Italy at a later stage to meet with Metropolitana in London, where the two worked tirelessly for two days without a break. A few days later, Archibald Kane joined the director from Italy and worked on set for almost a week. Editing lasted many months and was so complex and elaborate that the director constantly searched for new elements to include. This meticulous attention to detail led to three nervous breakdowns (the third was so severe it required medical attention). The film used over 2,000 sounds and multiple layers of altered photography.

== Release ==
The film was released in Germany on July 15, 2025 by Ultravisual Films as a media book, containing a 30-page removable booklet essay by Nando Rohner and an interview with Metropolitana. The media book was made available with two different covers showcasing different art-work for the film, "Cover A" and "Cover B". This media book also contains other works by Metropolitana, including: a featurette "Guerrilla Metropolitana - A Cinematographic Libertine" and a short film titled "Corporate Torment - it burns like hell!".
