= Yehuda Deri =

Israeli rabbi (1958–2024)

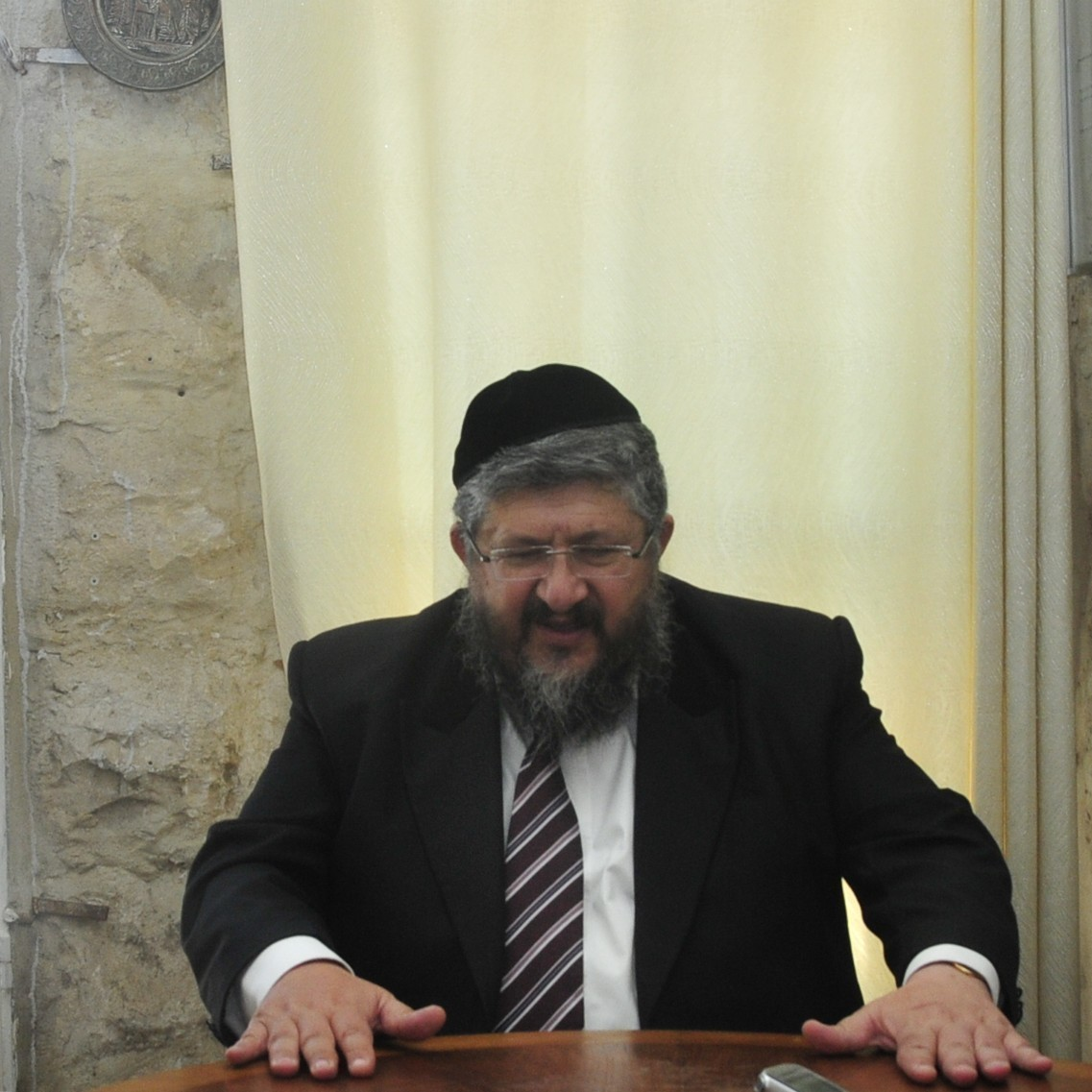

Yehuda Deri (Hebrew: יהודה דרעי; 31 July 1957 – 9 July 2024) was an Israeli rabbi, member of the Chief Rabbinical Council of Israel, and the Chief Rabbi of Beersheba from 1997. In 2013, he was a candidate for Chief Rabbi of Israel. He was also a past candidate for Chief Rabbi for Jerusalem and for Tel Aviv.

Deri died of complications from a leg infection on 9 July 2024, at the age of 66. He was the older brother of Aryeh Deri and Shlomo Deri.
