= Tarja Laitiainen =

Finnish diplomat

Tarja Laitiainen is a Finnish diplomat. She started working for the Ministry for Foreign Affairs in 1980. Laitianien was appointed as the Finnish Ambassador to Portugal in Lisbon on October 1, 2016.

Laitiainen worked in Portugal at the Ministry of Foreign Affairs as Head of National Security Authority (NSA). She has worked at the Finnish Embassies in Lima and Tokyo and in the Finnish UN and UNESCO delegations. She was a national expert at the EU Commission in 1996–1998. In the Foreign Ministry, she has worked in various positions at the Political and Development Policy Department and as Head of Asia and Oceania. Laitiainen has served as a rotating ambassador to Afghanistan and Pakistan from 2002 to 2005 and as ambassador to Finland in Luxembourg since 2005 and thereafter in Bulgaria as of 13 March 2009 and at the same time in Kosovo.

== Honours ==
- Portugal: Grand Cross of the Order of Merit (24 July 2020)
