= Ivan Marchenko (disambiguation) =

Ivan Marchenko is the apparent identity of Treblinka guard "Ivan the Terrible".

Ivan Marchenko may also refer to:

- Ivan Marchenko (Russian politician) (1908–1972), member of the Central Committee of the 20th Congress of the Communist Party of the Soviet Union
- Ivan Marchenko (Ukrainian politician), Member of the Verkhovna Rada, 1990–1994
- Ivan Marchenko (pilot), a Hero of the Soviet Union
