= Darya Saltykova =

Darya Saltykova may refer to:

- Darya Nikolayevna Saltykova (1730–1801), Russian noblewoman, known as a serial killer
- Darya Petrovna Saltykova (1739–1802), Russian lady-in-waiting and socialite
- Darya Sergeyevna Saltykova (born 1993), Russian Mas-wrestler
