= Darius Brown =

Darius Brown may refer to:

- Darius A. Brown (1869–1938), mayor of Kansas City, Missouri, 1910–1912
- Darius J. Brown, Delaware legislator
- Darius Brown (basketball) (born 1999), American professional basketball player
