= Darius Mažintas =

Lithuanian pianist and politician

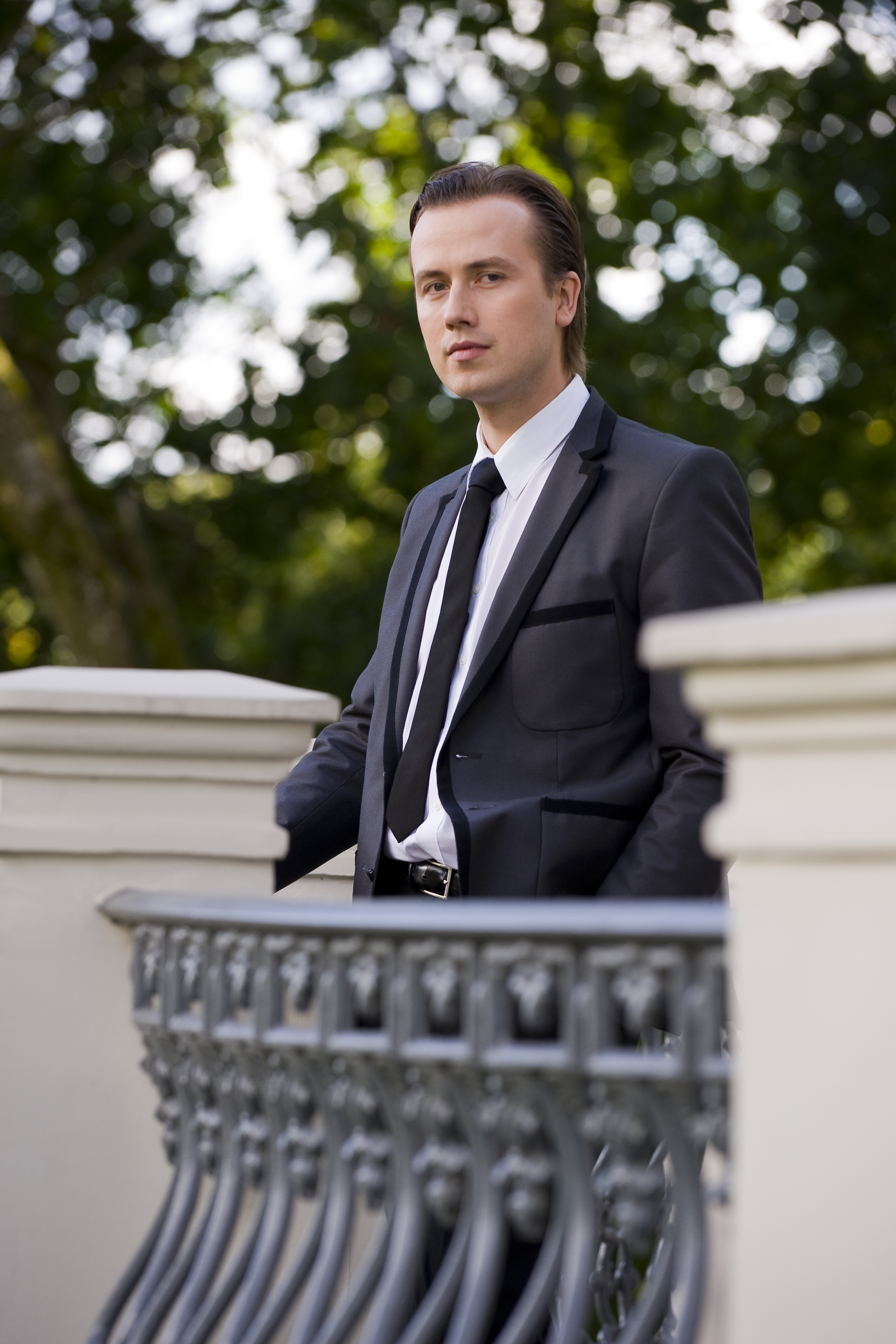
Darius Mažintas

Darius Mažintas (born 7 March 1982 in Vilnius) is a Lithuanian pianist and politician. Since March 2013 to September 2014 he has been Vice Minister for Culture.

== Biography ==
Mažintas studied at the National M. K. Čiurlionis School of Art beginning in 1988. In 2000 he graduated from the Balys Dvarionas School of Music and from 2005 to 2006 he pursued further studies at Conservatorio Giuseppe Verdi in Como, Italy. In 2010 he completed a Candidate of Sciences degree at Lithuanian Academy of Music and Theatre. As a concert pianist, he has taken part in the Arthur Rubinstein competition in France (2003), the International Stasys Vainiūnas competition in Lithuania (2000) and the Konzerteum in Greece (1998), represented Lithuania with cellist Gleb Pyšniakas at the International Holland Music Sessions for young musicians in the Netherlands in 2009, and performed in several countries, for example in 2011 in Bratislava with the Slovak Philharmonic.

In March 2013 he succeeded Faustas Latėnas as Lithuanian Vice Minister for Culture, deputy to Šarūnas Birutis, in the Butkevičius Cabinet.
