= Daria coenosella =

Scientific classification
- Kingdom: Animalia
- Phylum: Arthropoda
- Clade: Pancrustacea
- Class: Insecta
- Order: Lepidoptera
- Family: Pyralidae
- Subfamily: Phycitinae
- Genus: Daria; Ragonot, 1888
- Species: D. coenosella

Binomial name
- Daria coenosella Ragonot, 1888

Species of moth

Daria is a genus of snout moths. It was described by Ragonot in 1888, and contains a single species, Daria coenosella. It is found in central Asia, including Kazakhstan and Mongolia.
