= Dehdari-ye Shurab =

Dehdari-ye Shurab دهداري شوراب
- Village
- Location within Iran
- Coordinates: 29°15′26″N 52°21′57″E
- Country: Iran
- Province: Fars
- County: Shiraz
- Bakhsh: Central
- Rural District: Siyakh Darengun

Population (2006)
  - Total: 205
- Time zone: UTC+3:30 (IRST)
  - Summer (DST): UTC+4:30 (IRDT)

Dehdari-ye Shurab (Persian: دهداري شوراب, also Romanized as Dehdārī-ye Shūrāb; also known as Dehdārī) is a village in Siyakh Darengun Rural District, in the Central District of Shiraz County, Fars province, Iran. At the 2006 census, its population was 205, in 47 families.
