= Darius Yuen =

Hong Kong investment banker and philanthropist

Darius Yuen Lai Yan (阮勵欣) (born 1969) is a Hong Kong investment banker and philanthropist. He is the founder and chairman of Sow (Asia) Foundation, a charity based in Hong Kong. Because of his contribution to charitable causes, he was named one of 48 Heroes of Philanthropy by Forbes. He was also one of the Men Of Hope 2017 Honorees (Champion for a Better Life). He served as senior advisor at LionRock Capital Limited (Hong Kong) and is currently the managing director and responsible officer of ZhongYi Investment Managers Limited. Yuen is a certified public accountant. He holds a Bachelor of Science in accounting from the University of Southern California.

Yuen was a former investment banker with BNP Paribas serving as head of equity capital markets from 1999 to 2007. He served as senior managing director at Bear Stearns Asia in 2008. He also served at Media Nation in 1998, at Peregrine Capital from 1994 to 1997, and at Price Waterhouse from 1991 to 1993.

Yuen has been involved with the International Christian School since 2018, being a member of its Board of Trustees and its School Supervisor.
