= Yevgeny Marchenko =

Yevgeny Marchenko may refer to:

- Yevgeny Marchenko (gymnast) (born 1964), Latvian-American gymnast
- Yevgeny Marchenko (politician) (born 1972), Russian politician
