= Darius Johnson =

Darius Johnson may refer to:

- Darius Johnson (American football) (born 1991), American wide receiver
- Darius Johnson (footballer) (born 2000), Grenadian forward
- Darrius Johnson (1972–2021), American cornerback

== See also ==
- Darius Johnson-Odom (born 1989), American basketball player
