= Darinka =

Darinka is a given name found in southern Slavic countries. People with the name include:

- Darinka, Princess of Montenegro (1838–1892), first Princess of Montenegro
- Darinka Mirković Borović (1896–1979), Montenegrin nurse during World War I
- Darinka Dentcheva, Bulgarian-American mathematician
- Darinka Jandrić (1910–2019), Bosnian-Serbian nurse
- Darinka Jevrić (1947–2007), Kosovo Serb poet
- Darinka Matić Marović (1937–2020), Serbian and Yugoslavian choir conductor
- Darinka Prijatelj (1883–1967), Bosnian abduction victim
- Darinka Radović (1896–1943), agricultural worker and activist
- Darinka Rolincová (born 1972), birth name of singer Dara Rolins
- Darinka Simic-Mitrovic (born 1937), Serbian author, composer and music educator
