= Dara =

Name in various languages

- Gender: both

Origin
- Origin: various
- Meaning: various

Other names
- Related names: Darius, Dora, Bojidar, Bozhidar, Bojidara

Dara are several given names used for both men and women in different languages.

== Etymology ==
Dara are several different homonymous names with different etymological origins.

- In Hebrew, Dara means "compassion" or "pearl of wisdom".
- In Bulgaria, North Macedonia and Serbia, Dara means "gift", or "to give a gift", its meaning directly derives from dar "gift".
- In Ibibio, Dara is a derivative of "joy", and it means "rejoice".
- In Indonesian, Dara is a feminine given name meaning "girl", "young woman", or "virgin".
- In Yoruba, Dara is a short form of the name Oluwadara or Oluwadarasimi, given to a male or female child meaning "God's Good". Oluwa means "God" and Dara means "is good".
- Dara is an anglicisation of the Irish language given name Dáire, which is likely derived from doire "oak wood". Despite traditionally being masculine, it is sometimes used as a unisex name. Alternative spellings include Daire or Darragh. It also occurs as a surname, possibly a version of the surname Mac Dubhdara.
- In Javanese, Dara means "dove" or "pigeon".
- Because of the diacritic mark in Yoruba, Dara is also a short form of Oluwaṣindara, which means "wonder (God still does wonder)".
- In Gokana, "Dara" mean to "carry".
- In Kazakh, Dara is a feminine given name meaning "special, one of a kind".
- In Khmer, Thai, and Lao, Dara is a unisex name meaning "star".
- In Persian, and Parsi communities, Dara (Persian: دارا) is a variant of the masculine given name Darius. In contemporary Persian, it means "rich", "well-off" and "well-to-do".
- In Punjabi, Dara means "leader".
- In Swahili, Dara means "the beautiful one".
- The word "Odara" derives from the Brazilian indigenous Ioruba word dara, meaning "gorgeous."
- In Urdu, Dara is a masculine given name meaning "possessor" or "sovereign" and "halo (of the moon)". It can also mean "sovereign" or "lord", a meaning shared with the Sikh language. In Urdu, Dara is a short form of Darius.
- In African-American culture, the name Dara is of Bermudian origin, also meaning "beautiful".

== First name ==
- Dara Greig (born 2000), Canadian ice hockey player
- Dara Murphy (born 1969), Irish politician
- Dara Nusserwanji Khurody (1906–1983), Indian dairy entrepreneur
- Dara Ó Briain (born 1972), Irish comedian and television presenter
- Dara Reneé, (born 2000), American actress
- Dara Shikoh, eldest son of Mughal emperor Shah Jahan
- Dara Singh, Indian actor and wrestler
- Dara Torres (born 1967), American Olympic swimming champion
- Darashaw Nosherwan Wadia (1883–1969), Indian geologist
- Dara Khosrowshahi (born 1969), businessman and CEO of Uber

== People ==
- Dara (South Korean singer) (born 1984), South Korean singer, actress and TV presenter, member of K-pop girl group 2NE1
- Dara (Bulgarian singer) (born 1998), a Bulgarian singer
- Dara Alizadeh (born 1993), Bermudian and American rower who represents Bermuda
- Dara Bashir (born 1960), Pakistani former first-class cricketer
- Dara Birnbaum (1946–2025), American video and installation artist
- Dara Brown (born 1964/1965), news anchor and senior producer for MSNBC.com
- Dara Bubamara, Serbian singer
- Dara Calleary, Irish politician
- Dara Dotiwalla (1933–2019), Indian cricket umpire
- Dara Fitzpatrick, Irish helicopter pilot
- Dara Gallagher, Irish Gaelic footballer
- Dara Greig (born 2000), American-born Canadian ice hockey player
- Dara Moskowitz Grumdahl, American magazine feature writer
- Dara Hayes, birth name of the Australian DJ Tigerlily
- Dara Horn, American novelist
- Dara Howell (born 1994), Canadian freestyle skier
- Dara Huang (born 1982/1983), British-American architect
- Dara Jingga, one of the Malay Dharmasraya princess who was intended to be betrothed to Javanese King Kertanegara of Singasari
- Dara Khosrowshahi, Iranian-American businessman, CEO of Uber
- Dara Kovačević (born 1983), former Serbian basketball player
- Dara Maclean (born 1986), American contemporary Christian singer and songwriter
- Dara Mohammed (born 1987), Iraqi football player of Kurdish ethnicity
- Dara Murphy, Irish politician
- Dara Nusserwanji Khurody (1906–1983), Indian dairy entrepreneur
- Darashaw Nosherwan Wadia (1883–1969), Indian geologist
- Dara Ó Briain, Irish comedian and TV presenter
- Dara Ó Cinnéide (born 1975), Irish former Gaelic footballer
- Dara Ó Conaola (born 1945), Irish writer
- Dara O'Shea, Irish Association Football player
- Dara Rasmi, princess of Chiang Mai
- Dara Reneé, American actress
- Dara Rolins, Slovak recording artist
- Dara Shikoh, Indian prince
- Dara Singh, Indian professional wrestler
- Dara Singh (Bajrang Dal), serial killer
- Dara Strolovitch, American political scientist
- Dara Torre, American politician
- Dara Torres, American swimmer
- Dara Tucker, American singer, songwriter, social commentator and satirist
- Dara (דרע) is a personage in 1 Chronicles 2:6, a descendant of Judah, son of Jacob.

== Fictional characters ==
- Sumerian God Enki was also known as "Dara-Mah"
- Dara is a young elf from The Witcher (TV series).
- Dara is a Romani person from the Brazilian novel Explode Coração
- Dara is an elder from Caer Pelyn village from Fire Emblem: The Sacred Stones
- Dara Shirazi, the protagonist of the book The Electric Heir.
- Dara is the Princess, and later the Queen, of the Courts of Chaos in The Chronicles of Amber

== See also ==
- List of Irish-language given names
