= Darius B. Warner =

American Union Army officer

Darius B. Warner (February 26, 1832 – February 27, 1917) was a Union Army officer during the American Civil War.

In 1863, as a lieutenant colonel, Warner led the 113th Ohio Infantry at the Battle of Chickamauga.

On April 3, 1866, President Andrew Johnson nominated Warner for appointment to the grade of brevet brigadier general of volunteers, to rank from March 13, 1865, and the United States Senate confirmed the appointment on April 26, 1866.

He married Nancy Robinson in Lancaster, Pennsylvania, on June 7, 1856. His Warner ancestors were from Anne Arundel County, Maryland, and Dublin, Ireland.

== See also ==
- List of American Civil War brevet generals (Union)
