= Aryeh Deri =

Israeli politician (born 1959)

- אריה דרעי أرييه درعي
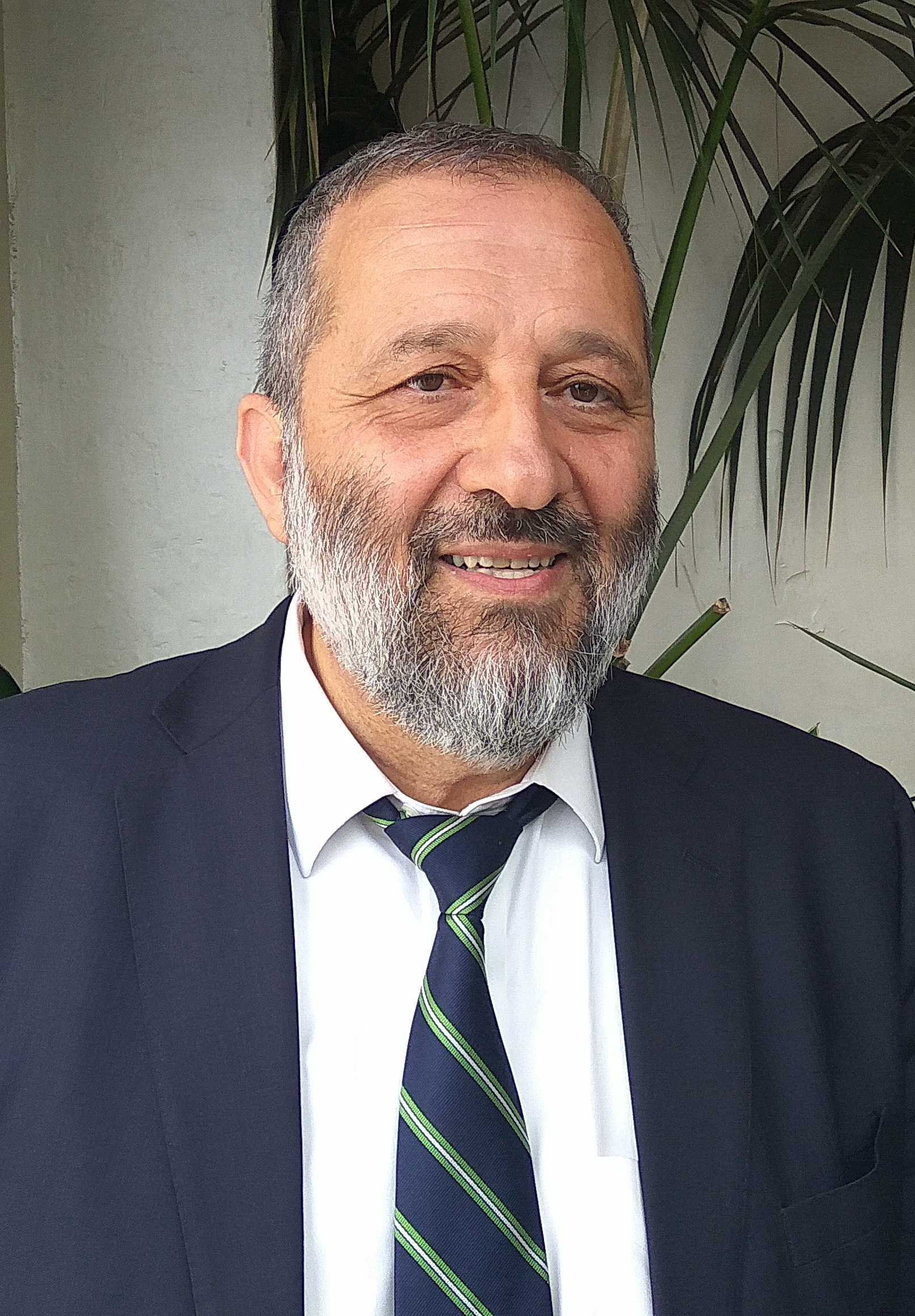
- Deri in 2018

Ministerial roles
- 1988–1992: Minister of Internal Affairs
- 1993: Minister without Portfolio
- 1993: Minister of Internal Affairs
- 2015: Minister of the Economy
- 2015–2021: Minister of the Development of the Negev and Galilee
- 2016–2021: Minister of Interior
- 2018: Minister of Religious Services
- 2022–2023: Minister of the Interior
- 2022–2023: Minister of Health
- 2022–2023: Vice Prime Minister

Faction represented in the Knesset
- 1992–1999: Shas
- 2013–2016: Shas
- 2019–2020: Shas
- 2021: Shas
- 2022–2026: Shas

Personal details
- Born: 17 February 1959 (age 67) Meknes, Morocco
- Citizenship: Israel
- Spouse: Yaffa Cohen (m. 1981)
- Children: 9
- Education: Porat Yosef Yeshiva; Hebron Yeshiva

Aryeh Makhlouf Deri (Hebrew: אריה מכלוף דרעי; Arabic: أريه مخلوف درعي), also Arie Deri, Arye Deri, or Arieh Deri (born 17 February 1959), is an Israeli politician and one of the founders of the Shas political party who served as the Minister of the Interior from 1988 to 1992, from 2015 to 2021, and December 2022 to January 2023. Deri held other ministerial roles in different Israeli governments, including Vice Prime Minister, Minister of Health, Minister of the Development of the Negev and Galilee, Minister of the Economy, as well as a member in the Security Cabinet of Israel.

In 1999, Deri was convicted of bribery, fraud, and breach of trust; he was given a three-year jail sentence. At the end of 2012, ahead of the elections for the nineteenth Knesset, he returned to lead the Shas party. He was placed in second position on the list, thus being re-elected to the Knesset. In May 2013, he was re-appointed to the role of Shas chairman. In December 2021, it was reported that Deri would resign from the Knesset as part of a plea deal for tax offenses. After re-entering the Knesset in the 2022 elections, he was appointed as Vice Prime Minister, Interior Minister, and Health Minister in the thirty-seventh government in December 2022. However, due to a January 2023 ruling by the Supreme Court of Israel that Deri was not eligible for a ministerial position due to his criminal convictions and the terms of his plea deal, he was dismissed from his official posts in the Israeli cabinet.

== Early life ==
Aryeh Makhlouf Deri was born in Meknes, Morocco, to Esther (née Azougi) and Eliyahu Deri. His parents lived in one of the new wealthy districts of the city and were influenced by French culture. His father owned a successful tailoring business; his family were modern Orthodox Jews. At the age of 5, Deri was enrolled at Ozar Hatorah, a school that combined secular and Orthodox Jewish religious education. In 1968, at the age of nine, his family immigrated to Israel and settled in Bat Yam. Deri attended a religious boarding school in Hadera. In 1973, he began to study at Porat Yosef, a leading Sephardic yeshiva in Jerusalem. In May 1976, he transferred to Hebron Yeshiva, where he received his rabbinical ordination.

After completing his yeshiva studies, Deri was appointed secretary of the Haredi settlement of Ma'ale Amos, and joined the Gush Etzion Regional Council. In 1983, he was appointed administrative manager of Lev Banim Yeshiva.

== Political career ==
=== Establishment of Shas ===
In 1984, he founded and began to serve as a secretary to Moetzet Chachmei HaTorah of Shas. During 1985, he served as an assistant to Interior Minister, Yitzhak Peretz, and at the end of the same year he was appointed to the role of the Secretary General of Shas. In June 1986, he enlisted for a shortened time of 3 months in the Israel Defense Forces.

=== Interior minister ===
Upon completing his military service at the age of 27, and after the elections for the 12th Knesset, he was appointed interior minister in the government of Yitzhak Shamir. Deri was sworn in on 22 December 1988. At 29, he was the youngest government minister in Israel's history.

As interior minister, he abolished the censorship of plays in theaters.

When the Israeli Labor Party sought to break away from the government and create a narrow coalition, Deri and Haim Ramon, a Knesset member from the Labor Party, initiated negotiations to create a Labor-Haredi alignment. A motion of no confidence was submitted on 15 March 1990, but five Knesset members on behalf of Shas party were absent from the vote. This agreement was later nicknamed "The dirty trick". Two rabbis, Menachem Mendel Schneerson and Elazar Shach, strongly opposed cooperating with the political left. As a result, the deal fell through, and the Labor Party chairman, Shimon Peres, failed to form a coalition. At the end, Yitzhak Shamir, Likud chairman, established a government of Likud–Right–Haredis, where Deri continued to serve as Interior Minister.

After the Labor Party, led by Yitzhak Rabin, won the elections in 1992, the Shas party joined the coalition, and Deri continued to serve as Interior Minister, and, for the first time, as a Knesset member. He remained Minister of the Interior until May 1993, when he became a Minister without Portfolio, before returning to the Interior Ministry in June. He left the cabinet in September 1993. He was re-elected to the Knesset in 1996.

=== Conviction ===
Deri was convicted of taking $155,000 in bribes while serving as the interior minister, and was given a three-year jail sentence in 2000. He was replaced by Eli Yishai. Due to good behavior, Deri was released from Maasiyahu Prison in 2002, after serving 22 months.

=== Return to public life ===
In June 2011, he announced that he was planning to return to politics. He was re-elected to the Knesset in 2013. However, on 28 December 2014, Channel 2 released video footage in which Ovadia Yosef, the founder of Shas, attacked Deri, calling him a wicked man and a thief. The same day, Deri handed a resignation letter to the rabbinical board of Shas, who refused to accept it. On the following day, Deri presented his resignation to the Knesset speaker Yuli-Yoel Edelstein, with his seat taken by Lior Edri.

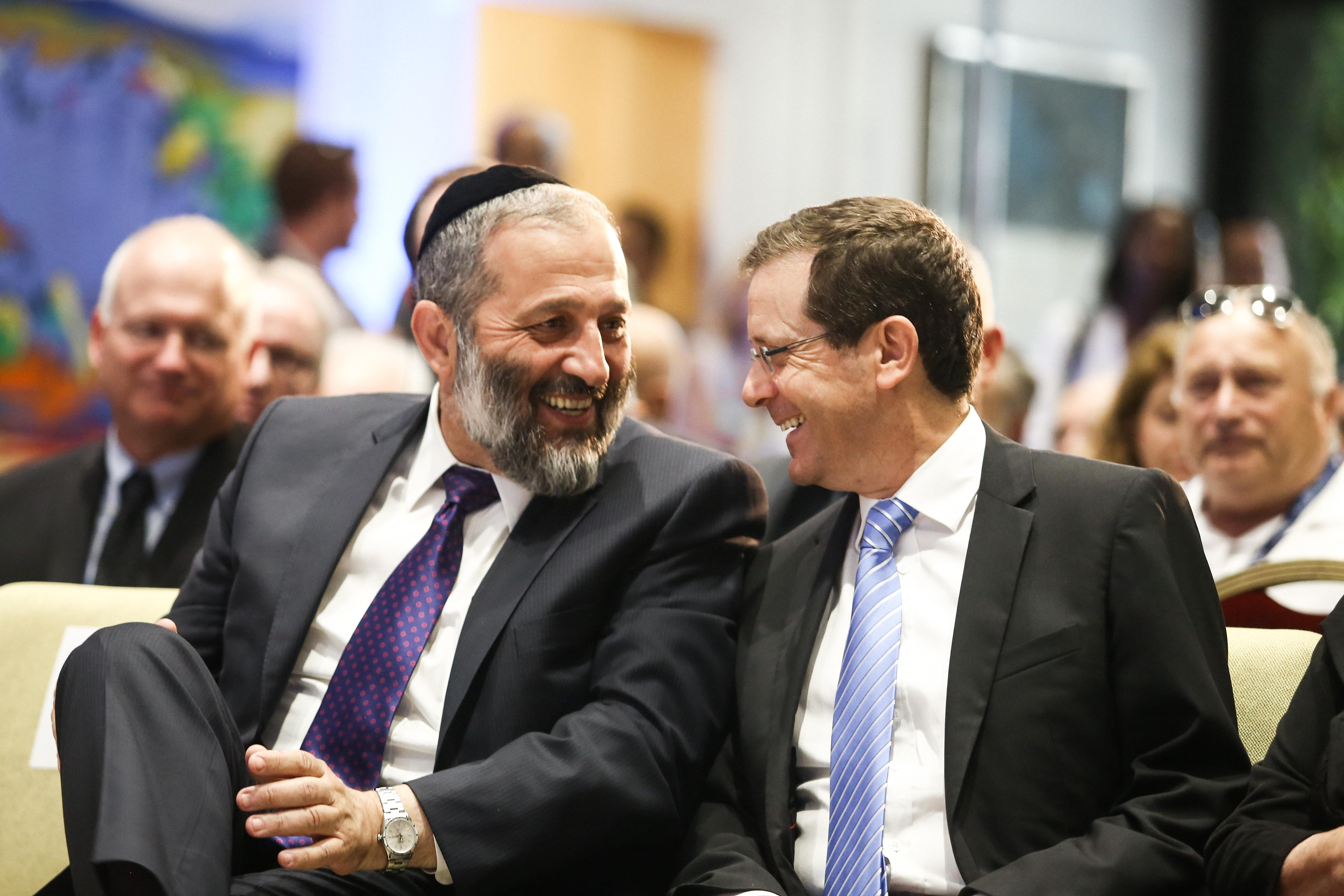
Deri with Zionist Union Leader and Leader of the Opposition Isaac Herzog, 2016

Despite his resignation from the Knesset, Deri headed the Shas list for the March 2015 election, and was subsequently appointed Minister of the Economy and Minister for the Development of the Negev and Galilee in the new government. He left his post as Minister of the Economy on 3 November 2015, reportedly over an unpopular gas monopoly deal, and was replaced by Netanyahu, who promised to speed up the deal. He was appointed Minister of the Interior on 11 January 2016. He resigned from the Knesset in October 2016 to allow Michael Malchieli to take his seat, whilst remaining a minister. He temporarily served as Minister of Religious Services in 2018 after the death of David Azulai.

On 17 April 2020, a senior Likud Minister, speaking unattributably, told Al-Monitor that Deri was mediating the political coalition talks between Netanyahu and leader of the opposition Blue and White alliance Benny Gantz. It was also reported Deri "might even be open to a new alliance with Blue and White — now that its anti-clerical component, Yair Lapid, quit the party and went his own way", and would only commit to remaining with Netanyahu's coalition until the next election.

=== Subsequent criminal conviction and resignation ===
On 20 November 2018, Israeli police ended a criminal investigation into Deri with a recommendation to state prosecutors that he be indicted for "committing fraud, breach of trust, obstructing court proceedings, money laundering, and tax offenses." In 2019, this recommendation was adopted in full by the state prosecutor, Shai Nitzan, but in 2021 the attorney general of Israel, Avichai Mandelblit, dropped all the charges except the tax offenses. Deri continued to serve as Interior Minister, and after losing the ministry with the formation of the thirty-sixth government of Israel, as an MK and chair of the Shas party.

On 23 January 2022, he resigned from the Knesset as part of a plea bargain. Deri admitted to underreporting the value of property sold to his brother Shlomo Deri to avoid land tax, failure to report income from the sales and evading tax on NIS 534,000 of income, by funneling payments from Green Ocean investment fund to his brother. Deri received a year's suspended sentence, and was also ordered to pay a NIS 180,000 fine. As part of the plea deal, no determination was made as to whether Deri's crimes carried "moral turpitude", which would have barred him from seeking election to the Knesset within 7 years of the plea agreement.

=== Return to the Knesset ===
On 2 February 2022, Deri gave a speech in which he accused his prosecution of being motivated by his Moroccan heritage, and expressed his intent to remain as leader of Shas. Deri led the party through the 2022 election, and returned to the Knesset after it won eleven seats. Deri became Minister of Interior, Minister of Health and Vice Prime Minister in the 37th government of Israel on 29 December 2022.

On 18 January 2023, the Supreme Court of Israel ruled that Deri was not allowed to hold a position as a cabinet minister due to his conviction for tax offenses. As a result, Deri was consensually dismissed from the cabinet on 22 January; his dismissal went into effect on 24 January. In his place, Deri chose Michael Malchieli as the acting Minister of Interior and Yoav Ben-Tzur as the acting Minister of Health. Deri retired from his Knesset seat on 8 November 2026 after the party's poor election results, with the party winning six seats, but remained as chairman of Shas.

== Personal life ==
Deri married Yaffa Cohen in 1981. They have nine children. He lives in the Bayit VeGan neighborhood of Jerusalem.

In addition to Hebrew, Deri is fluent in Moroccan Arabic and French. His older brother, Yehuda Deri, was the Chief Rabbi and Av Beit Din of the city of Be'er Sheva. He was also a member of the Chief Rabbinate Council. Yehuda died in July 2024. Another brother of Deri, Shlomo, is a lawyer.

== See also ==
- List of Israeli public officials convicted of crimes or misdemeanors
- Jews of Morocco
