= Dara Greig =

Canadian ice hockey player (born 2000)

- Born: December 30, 2000 (age 25) Camden, New Jersey, U.S.
- Height: 5 ft 7 in (170 cm)
- Position: Forward
- Shoots: Left
- PWHL team Former teams: Ottawa Charge; Montreal Victoire
- Playing career: 2019–present

Dara Greig (born December 30, 2000) is a Canadian-American professional ice hockey forward for the Ottawa Charge of the Professional Women's Hockey League (PWHL). She formerly played for the Montreal Victoire, but signed to Ottawa in 2026. Greig won the Walter cup with the Victoire in 2026. Dara and her brother Ridly became one of the first brother-sister duo to play in the same city. She played college ice hockey at Wisconsin and Colgate.

== Early life ==
Greig attended George Elliot Secondary School where she played basketball and ice hockey. During her sophomore season, she helped her team win the Detroit 2 Nations Cup Championship and was named the tournament's MVP. She was also named a World Sports Challenge first-team All-Star. She then attended the Pursuit of Excellence. During her junior year, she won the Canadian Sport School Hockey League Championship, scoring 25 goals and 38 assists for a league-high 63 points. During her senior year, she recorded 20 goals and 42 assists in 25 games and won the Stoney Creek Invitational Championship.

== Playing career ==
=== College ===
Greig began her collegiate hockey career for Wisconsin during the 2017–18 season. During her freshman year, she recorded three goals and three assists in 36 games. During 2020–21 season in her sophomore year, she recorded two goals and three assists in 21 games, and helped the Badgers win the 2021 NCAA tournament.

In July 2021, Greig transferred to Colgate. During the 2021–22 season in her junior year, she recorded 20 goals and 22 assists in 39 games. During the 2022–23 season in her senior year, she recorded 20 goals and 17 assists in 39 games. During the 2023–24 season, as a graduate student, she recorded 17 goals and 25 assists in 40 games. She finished her collegiate career with 62 goals and 70 assists in 175 games.

=== Professional ===
On June 10, 2024, Greig was drafted in the fourth round, 23rd overall, by PWHL Montreal in the 2024 PWHL Draft. In November 2024, she signed a standard contract with Montreal.

== Personal life ==
Greig was born in Camden, New Jersey, to Mark and Cindy Greig, and grew up in Lethbridge, Alberta. She has a brother, Ridly, and a sister, Kyra. Her father, Mark, played nine seasons in the National Hockey League (NHL). Ridly is a professional ice hockey player for the Ottawa Senators. Kyra played ice hockey at the University of Lethbridge. Her uncle, Bruce, is also a former professional ice hockey player.

== Career statistics ==
			Regular season					Playoffs
Season	Team	League	GP	G	A	Pts	PIM	GP	G	A	Pts	PIM
2019–20	University of Wisconsin	WCHA	36	3	3	6	8	—	—	—	—	—
2020–21	University of Wisconsin	WCHA	21	2	3	5	2	—	—	—	—	—
2021–22	Colgate University	ECAC	39	20	22	42	34	—	—	—	—	—
2022–23	Colgate University	ECAC	39	20	17	37	25	—	—	—	—	—
2023–24	Colgate University	ECAC	40	17	25	42	39	—	—	—	—	—
2024–25	Montreal Victoire	PWHL	29	0	3	3	16	4	0	0	0	0
2025–26	Montreal Victoire	PWHL	29	3	2	5	20	9	0	1	1	4
NCAA totals			175	62	70	132	108	—	—	—	—	—
PWHL totals			58	3	5	8	36	13	0	1	1	4

== Awards and honours ==
Honours	Year
PWHL
Walter Cup champion	2026
