= Taija Finni =

Finnish academic

- Occupation: Academic
- Education: University of Jyväskylä, Finland (MSc, PhD)
- Subject: Muscle-tendon Biomechanics, Neuromuscular Function, Physical Activity

Website
- Profile at University of Jyväskylä

Taija Juutinen, known professionally as Taija Finni, is a professor of kinesiology at the University of Jyväskylä. She specializes in muscle-tendon biomechanics largely focused on the Achilles tendon, neuromuscular function, and physical activity.

== Education and career ==
Finni completed her MSc in biomechanics in 1997, and PhD in 2001 under the supervision of Paavo Komi at the University of Jyväskylä, Faculty of Sport and Health Sciences, Finland. She pursued her post-doctoral studies at the University of California, Los Angeles with Reggie V. Edgerton and Shantanu Sinha at the Department of Physiological Sciences and Radiological Sciences. She also worked as a senior researcher at the Department of Health Sciences before rejoining the Department of Biology of Physical Activity where she has held positions such as lecturer, senior assistant, and associate professor. She holds a docentship in exercise physiology at the University of Eastern Finland. She has been a full professor since 2010 and is currently also the vice dean of education at the University of Jyväskylä, Faculty of Sport and Health Sciences, Finland.

== Research ==
=== Muscle-tendon behavior ===
Finni's research explores Achilles tendon and patellar tendon forces during human walking in vivo, and simultaneously examines muscle fascicle length characteristics using ultrasonography for studying muscle mechanics during human locomotion. She has also investigated the behavior of the quadriceps femoris and triceps surae muscle groups during different jumping exercises and isokinetic (constant velocity) knee and ankle extensions, providing insights into muscle-tendon unit power production. Notably, she has published novel findings on the non-uniform behavior of the loaded aponeurosis in humans and the non-uniform displacement and strain of Achilles subtendons in rats. She has contributed to a critical review on using ultrasonography for tendon imaging, highlighted the uncertainties of assessing tendon hysteresis in vivo in humans, and suggested important considerations for tendon stiffness assessments in humans. With funding from the Research Council of Finland, she continues to study the human Achilles tendon to develop a method to identify its three-dimensional structure and produce a rehabilitation and training tool to allow individualized tendon loading prescription.

=== Physical activity ===
Regarding physical activity research, Finni has used innovative wearables that record the electrical activity of muscles (i.e. electromyography) during daily activities. Compared to accelerometry that is typically used to assess physical activity levels via sensed impacts, electromyography has the advantage of recording the signals that can initiate the movement. Finni's group has shown that muscle activity and inactivity levels are associated with metabolic health markers, they explored how interrupting muscle inactivity can contribute to energy expenditure and health and examined if increased physical activity can decrease daily muscle inactivity.

Physical activity research is intertwined with neuromuscular function in Finni's EXECP-project which was an exercise intervention for children and young adults with cerebral palsy. By using a multicomponent exercise intervention, participants increased strength, flexibility, and motor coordination which were transferred to significant functional gains.

== Professional achievements ==
Finni is member of the International Society of Biomechanics where she served as an education officer in 2015–2017 and became a fellow in 2021. She is a member and fellow of the European College of Sport Sciences and Finnish Society of Sport Sciences.

Finni has served as the section editor (2007–2015), senior section editor (2016–2021), and a member of the editorial board (2021–present) at the Scandinavian Journal of Medicine and Science in Sports. She has also served as an academic editor for Translational Sports Medicine (2020–2023), as member of the editorial board for Clinical Biomechanics (2010–present), and as scientific editor for Studies in Sport, Physical Education and Health, University of Jyväskylä (2012–2019).

== Awards ==
- Award in recognition of credits in research from the Ellen & Artturi Nyyssönen foundation, 2015
- Finalist for Promising Young Scientist Award by the International Society of Biomechanics, 2005
- Academia Europaean Arnold Burgen Scholar, 2004
- Finalist for UCLA Chancellor's Award for Postdoctoral Research, 2003
- Finalist for the Calgary Award at the Congress of the International Society of Biomechanics, 1999
- European College of Sport Science Young Investigators Award, 1st prize, 199.
