= Darius Jones =

Darius Jones may refer to:

- Leon Reid IV (born 1979), also known as Darius Jones, American artist
- Darius Jones (saxophonist) (born 1978), American jazz alto saxophonist and composer
