= Darius (surname) =

Darius is a surname derived from the Persian-origin masculine given name Darius. Notable people with the surname include:

- Adam Darius (1930–2017), American dancer and writer
- Claudia Darius, German soprano
- Donovin Darius (born 1975), American football player
- Eric Darius (born 1982), American saxophonist and songwriter
- Steponas Darius (1896–1933), Lithuanian-American pilot
- Vincent Darius (1955–2016), Grenadian bishop

== See also ==
- Darius (given name)
