= Chrysanthus and Daria =

Early Christian saints

Saints Chrysanthus and Daria
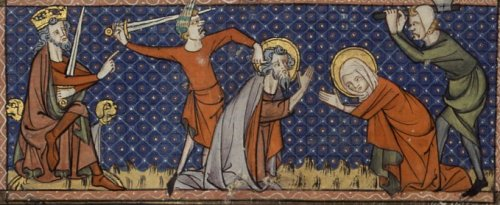
- The martyrdom of Sts Chrysanthus and Daria. From a 14th-century manuscript

Martyrs
- Born: 3rd century Rome, Roman Empire
- Died: 283 AD; Rome
- Venerated in: Eastern Orthodox Churches; Roman Catholic Church
- Canonized: Pre-Congregation
- Feast: October 25 (Western Christianity); March 19 (Eastern Christianity)
- Attributes: Crosses

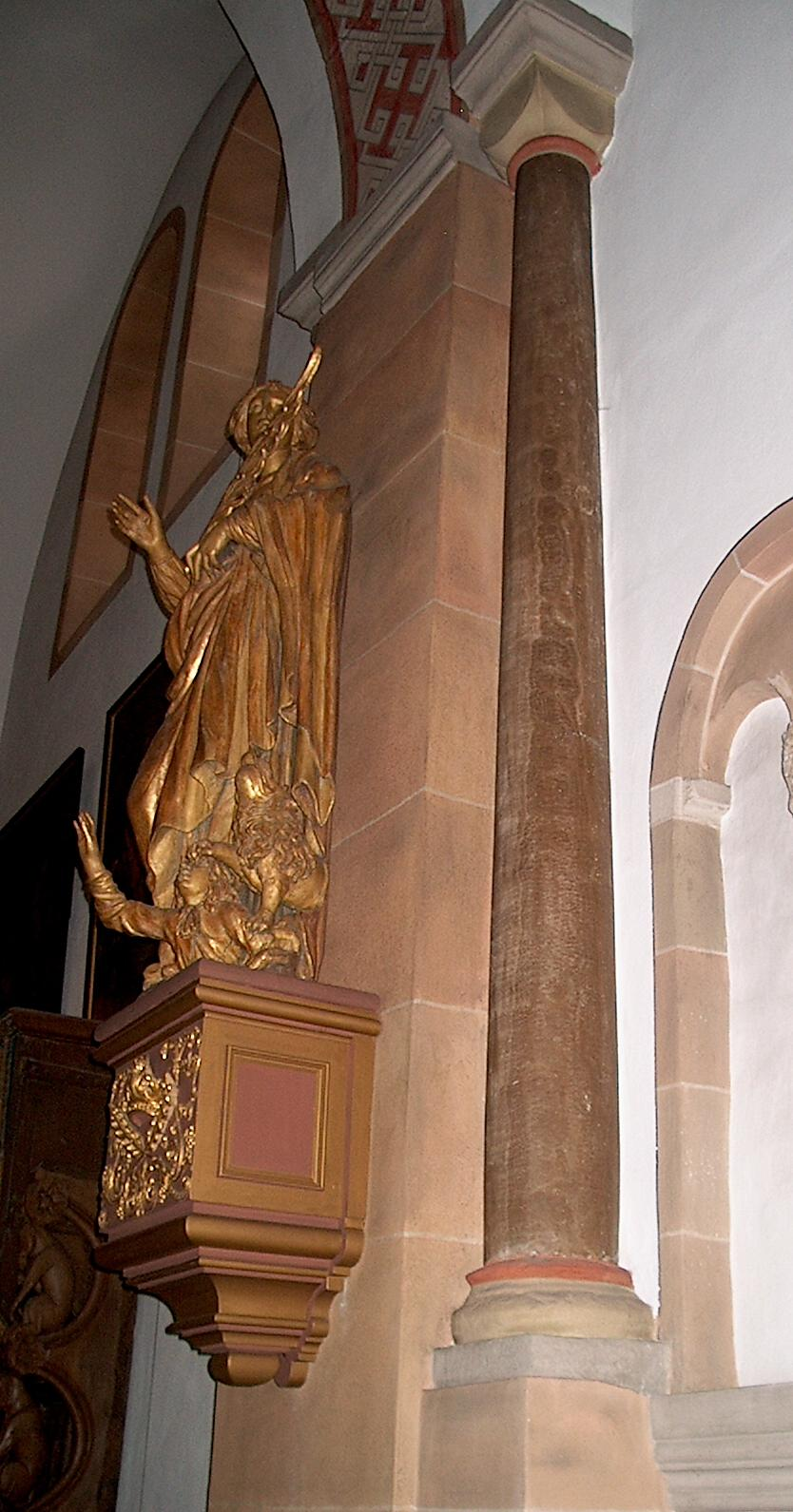
A column made of calc-sinter ("Eifel-Marmor"), in the church St. Chrysanthus und Daria, Bad Münstereifel, Germany.

Saints Chrysanthus and Daria (3rd century – 283 AD) were saints of the Early Christian period. Their names appear in the Martyrologium Hieronymianum, an early martyrs list, and a church in their honour was built over their reputed grave in Rome.

== Legend ==
The Acts of the Martyrs relating the legend of Chrysanthus and Daria exist in Greek and Latin versions written by writers like Armenius, dating from the fifth century and all "without historical value", according to Johann Peter Kirsch, writing in the Catholic Encyclopedia.

According to legend, Chrysanthus was the only son of an Egyptian patrician, named Polemius or Poleon, who lived in the reign of Numerian. His father moved from Alexandria to Rome, and Chrysanthus was educated in the finest manner of the era. Disenchanted with the excess in the Roman world, he began reading the Acts of the Apostles.

He was then baptized and educated in the Christian faith by a priest named Carpophorus. His father was unhappy with Chrysanthus's conversion, and attempted to inculcate secular ways into his son by arranging a marriage to Daria, a Roman priestess of Minerva, or as other accounts state, a Vestal Virgin. Chrysanthus managed to convert his wife, and the couple agreed to lead celibate lives. They went on to convert a number of Romans.

When this was made known to Claudius, the tribune, Chrysanthus was arrested and tortured. Chrysanthus's faith and fortitude under torture were so impressive to Claudius that he and his wife, Hilaria, two sons named Maurus and Jason, and seventy of his soldiers became Christians. For this betrayal, the Emperor had Claudius drowned, his sons beheaded, and his wife hanged at the gallows. The legend states that Daria was forced to live as a prostitute, as virgins could not be executed, but her chastity was defended by a lioness. She was brought before Numerian and he ordered her death. There are many variations to the means, from execution by stoning, while others say she was beheaded, and yet others claim she was buried alive in a deep pit beside her husband. It appears the last torment was chosen for Daria, as it was the execution method reserved for unchaste Vestal Virgins. They were entombed in a sand pit near the Via Salaria Nova, the catacombs in Rome.

The surviving "Acts" of Chrysanthus and Daria state that on the anniversary of their deaths, a large number of Christians had gathered at their underground crypt to pay their respects when Roman persecutors surprised them, filled the crypt with stones and buried them all alive, including Diodorus, a priest, and Marianus, a deacon.

== Historicity ==
In 2011 a scientific investigation of the bodies, conducted by a group of scholars coordinated by Ezio Fulcheri, paleopathologist at the University of Genoa, highlighted the compatibility of the finds with the story handed down by tradition.

Radiocarbon dating reveals that the remains of the two young people, a male between the age of 17 and 18 and a female between 20 and 25, date back to an era of between AD 80 and 340. A high concentration of lead was found in the bones, a sign of their wealthy background as only the rich had running water in the houses, conducted through lead pipes. Neither of the bodies showed signs of violence or illness, so the cause of death could be compatible with suffocation.

== Relics ==
At least three places claim to possess the remains of Chrysanthus and Daria. In the ninth century, their reputed remains were brought to Prüm in modern-day Rhineland-Palatinate, and these relics are presently in the church of Chrysanthus and Daria, Bad Münstereifel, Germany. In 1011, Pope Sergius IV gave Fulk III, Count of Anjou, the reputed bodies of Chrysanthus and Daria upon his return from a pilgrimage to Jerusalem. Fulk gave them to the monastery of Belli Locus (now Beaulieu-lès-Loches), which he had recently established. The cathedral of Reggio Emilia in northern Italy also contains relics reputed to be those of Daria and Chrysanthus. A scientific study of some of the bones there confirmed that they were those of a young man and a young woman in their late teens, with a radiocarbon date between 80 and 340.
