= Dario (disambiguation) =

Dario is a masculine given name from Dariush.

Dario may also refer to:

== People ==
- Dario, list of people with the given name
- Rubén Darío (1867–1916), Nicaraguan poet
- Dario (footballer) (1944–2021), Brazilian footballer Jurandir Dário Gouveia Damasceno dos Santos
- Dario (entertainer), American singer-songwriter Dario Dicochea (fl. 2004–present)

== Other uses ==
- Ciudad Darío, a Nicaraguan municipality named after Rubén Darío
- Darío (crater), a crater on the planet Mercury named after Rubén Darío
- Palazzo Dario, a palace in Venice, Italy
- Dario (fish), a genus of fishes in the family Badidae
- Dario G, English dance music trio
- Daihatsu Terios, a car known as Dario in China
