= Darina (singer) =

Mexican singer-songwriter, producer, and politician (born 1980)

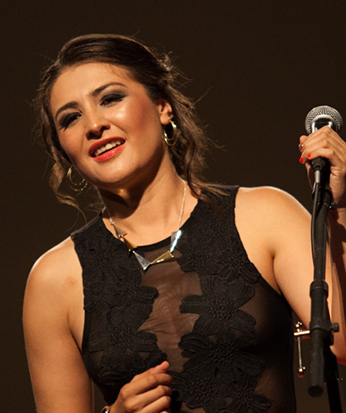

Background information
- Born: Darina Márquez Uribe; 28 July 1980 (age 46)
- Origin: Mexico
- Genres: Pop, acoustic
- Occupation: Singer-songwriter
- Years active: 1994–2002 (soccer career); 1996–present (music career)
- Label: Universal Music (2003–06)
- Website: Darina official website

Darina Márquez Uribe (Pachuca, Hidalgo; born 28 July 1980) known as Darina, is a Mexican singer-songwriter, record producer, politician, activist, voice actress and former professional soccer player; after her professional debut in 1996 as a radio host and frontwoman in a rock band in 1996, she was named as the first-place winner on the interactive reality show Operación Triunfo México on November 10, 2002; becoming the first winner ever of a singing competition television series in LatinAmerica.

She has been working with multiple mass media companies including The Walt Disney Company, Televisa, NBC, Endemol and Fox Sports among others; Darina also provided the main soundtracks for different television series including Velo de Novia and Big Brother 2 in Mexico. She was finalist at the Worldbest International Contest in Cannes, France in 2004, representing her country and performing alongside others singers like Phil Collins and Lionel Richie.

On the other hand, before she became an artist, Darina was a founding member of the Women's Pachuca Football Club in 1994; besides, she was a candidate for the Mexican Senate of the Republic in 2018, and a candidate for the city council of Pachuca in 2020.

== Career ==
=== 1994–2001: Early life and professional debut ===
Darina was born in Hidalgo, Pachuca, Mexico. She has an older brother, Jorge; they were raised by their mother. From 1994 to 2002, Darina was a professional soccer player and founding member of the women's soccer club "Tuzas del Pachuca"; she also co-captained the Mexico women's national soccer team during the mid-90s. In 1996, Darina began working in the music industry as a soloist. She later worked at a radio station in Mexico; on the other hand, she was the founding member of the rock band Sol & Luna, in 1996; at the time, Darina attended National Institute of Fine Arts and Literature in Mexico city. In 2001, she began studying on the University of Pachuca; at the time she auditioned for Operación Triunfo México.

=== 2002–present: Operación Triunfo, breakthrough, Cannes and resurgence ===
In 2002, after several auditions, Darina was selected to join the reality musical contest Operación Triunfo, for which, she won the first place of that reality show, becoming the first winner of a singing competition television series in LatinAmerica; immediately, she signed to Universal Music Group and released her second album Darina in 2003, which was certified Double Platinum; her eponymous album was recorded in Madrid and México city with the collaboration of David Bisbal, Mario Domm, Sabo Romo and Áureo Baqueiro.

Her first single De corazón a corazón was the principal theme of the soap opera Velo de Novia by Juan Osorio. In 2004 she went to France, to being part of World Best, another reality show, representing Mexico, but she won 4th place with 66 points. Recently, she has been working on her second album, which is planned to be released in 2008. Last year she had a few presentations in Canada, singing in local bars and clubs. Nowadays she performs in Mexico. In 2008, she released her album, Hoy Como Ayer. The album was produced by Vladimir Arredondo, and it was recorded in Mexico City. The first single "Cansada" was originally released in 2008, and later re-released worldwide in 2010.

== Discography ==
=== Studio albums ===
| Year | Album title | Tracklist | Album details |
|---|---|---|---|
| 2002 | Mis Exitos En Operación Triunfo | "Suerte" "Lucha de Gigantes" "El Duelo" "Inevitable" "Hacer el Amor con Otro"" "Sexy Dance" "Mujer contra Mujer" "Aserejé" "A Puro Dolor" "Te Ámo" "Adoro/Con La Misma Piedra" "Todo ó Nada" "De Mi Enamorate" "Amor en Silencio" "Un Mundo Raro" "I´m So Excited" | * Label: Sony BMG, Ariola, Vale Music * Formats: Compact Disc, cassette |
| 2003 | DARINA | "Déjame Conmigo" "De Corazón A Corazón (Inevitable)" "Crecer" "Como Tú Conmigo" "Libertad Condicional" "Tú y Yo" "Nunca Me Olvides" "No Bastó" "No es Solución" "Sola" | * Label: Universal Music Group * Formats: Compact Disc, cassette |
| 2008 | Hoy como Ayer | "Cansada" "Al Demonio Tú" "Contigo" "Para Quien" "Nada Fácil" "Hoy como Ayer" "Natural" "Acortando La Distancia" "Si Te Vás" "Ahora No" "Mi Angel, mi Diable" | * Label: (Dara Prod.), Tr3s Music * Formats: CD, cassette |
| 2019 | Libertad | "Librtad" "Sin Coincidir" "Ángel" "Como Olvidar" "No Sé" "Ámarte Así" "Si Una Véz" "No Sé (Latin Reprise)" "Stay (Tove Lo cover)" | * Label: Dara Productions * Formats: Digital Download, CD |
| 2020 | Acústico '04 En Vivo | | * Label: (Dara Prod.) * Formats: CD, digital download |

=== Singles discography ===
List of singles as lead artist, with selected chart positions and certifications, showing year released and album name
| Title | Year | Peak chart positions | | | | | | Sales | Certifications | Album |
| Title | Year | US | US AC | US R&B /HH | US Latin | ARG | MEX | Sales | Certifications | Album |
|---|---|---|---|---|---|---|---|---|---|---|
"—" denotes releases that did not chart or were not released in that territory.
