= Darius Williams (defensive back) =

American gridiron football player (born 1998)

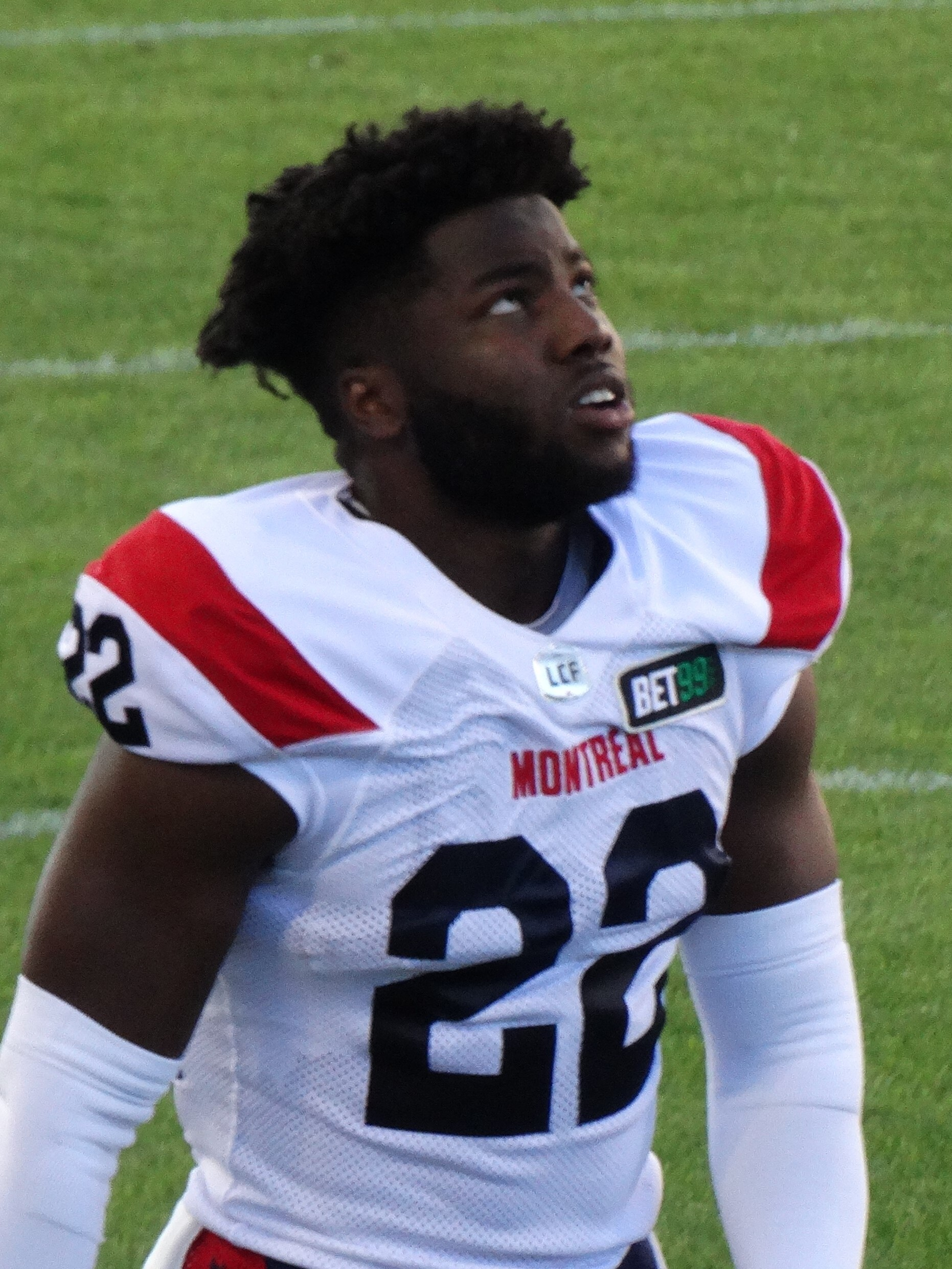
- Williams with the Montreal Alouettes in 2022

No. 21 – Vegas Knight Hawks
- Position: Defensive back
- CFL status: American

Personal information
- Born: August 11, 1998 (age 28); St. Petersburg, Florida, U.S.
- Listed height: 5 ft 10 in (1.78 m)
- Listed weight: 195 lb (88 kg)

Career information
- College: Carson–Newman

Career history
- 2021: Edmonton Elks
- 2022: Montreal Alouettes
- 2022: Ottawa Redblacks
- 2024: Massachusetts Pirates
- 2024–present: Vegas Knight Hawks

Awards and highlights
- IFL champion (2025)
- Stats at CFL.ca

Darius Williams (born August 11, 1998) is an American football defensive back for the Vegas Knight Hawks of the Indoor Football League (IFL). He played college football at Carson-Newman University.

== Early life ==
Williams was born and raised in St. Petersburg, Florida. He attended school at Osceola Fundamental High School for his freshman and the first semester of his sophomore year. He then transferred to Northside Christian School. He played as a safety while at Northside Christian School. He was named a Blue-Gray all-American and Pinellas County All-Star for having the most tackles for a defensive back over a two-year period in high school.

== College career ==
Williams attended Carson–Newman University where he played for the Eagles. He participated in the East-West Shrine Bowl in 2020, after four seasons at the collegiate level. He recorded 179 tackles, a sack, eight interceptions, and two fumble recoveries in 41 games. He graduated from Carson-Newman University with a bachelor's degree in Exercise Science and Recreational Management.

== Professional career ==
=== Edmonton Elks ===
Williams signed with the Edmonton Elks on January 11, 2021. He played in all 14 regular season games where he had 30 defensive tackles, six special teams tackles, and one forced fumble. However, he was released on February 14, 2022.

=== Montreal Alouettes ===
On February 17, 2022, Williams signed a one-year contract with the Montreal Alouettes. He played in his first game as an Alouette on June 16, 2022, where he also recorded his first career interception in the game against the Toronto Argonauts. He played in ten regular season games where he recorded nine defensive tackles, five special teams tackles, and two interceptions before being released on September 20, 2022.

=== Ottawa Redblacks ===
On October 6, 2022, it was announced that Williams had signed a practice roster agreement with the Ottawa Redblacks. On May 18, 2023, Williams was released by the Redblacks.

=== Massachusetts Pirates ===
On December 19, 2023, Williams signed with the Massachusetts Pirates of the Indoor Football League (IFL).

=== Vegas Knight Hawks ===
Williams was traded to the Vegas Knight Hawks on May 25, 2024.
