= Daria Marchenko =

Ukrainian artist

Daria Marchenko (Ukrainian: Дарія Марченко; born c. 1982) is a Ukrainian artist who has worked with bullet shells from the war in Donbas in eastern Ukraine. In 2015, Marchenko created in her studio in Kyiv a portrait called "The Face of War" of Russian President Vladimir Putin, made up with 5,000 bullet casings from the conflict. The portrait was presented along with a novel with the personal stories of six people involved with the project, including Daria's own story, and of the people who helped her collect the cartridges at the front.

== Personal life ==
Marchenko has had a boyfriend who was an active member in the Euromaidan movement and helped her get the first shells for the portrait of "The Face of War".
