= Ilat-e Yalquz Aghaj =

Village in East Azerbaijan province, Iran

Ilat-e Yalquz Aghaj Persian: ايلات يالقوزاغاج
- Village
- Location within Iran
- Coordinates: 38°28′14″N 45°39′18″E
- Country: Iran
- Province: East Azerbaijan
- County: Marand
- District: Koshksaray
- Rural District: Yalquz Aghaj

Population (2016)
  - Total: 1,441
- Time zone: UTC+3:30 (IRST)

Ilat-e Yalquz Aghaj (Persian: ايلات يالقوزاغاج) (Note: Also romanized as Īlāt-e Yālqūz Āghāj) is a village in Yalquz Aghaj Rural District of Koshksaray District in Marand County, East Azerbaijan province, Iran.

== Demographics ==
=== Population ===
At the time of the 2006 National Census, the village's population was 1,501 in 352 households, when it was in Koshksaray Rural District of the Central District. The following census in 2011 counted 1,496 people in 395 households. The 2016 census measured the population of the village as 1,441 people in 425 households.

In 2020, the rural district was separated from the district in the formation of Koshksaray District, and Ilat-e Yalquz Aghaj was transferred to Yalquz Aghaj Rural District created in the new district.
