= Dara-e Hazara =

Dara-e-Hazara Abshar District and Dara District (modern names)
- Historical region
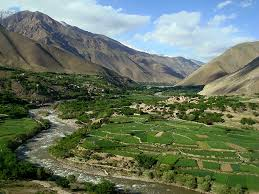
- Aerial view of Dara-e-Hazara

- Location of Dara-e-Hazara in Afghanistan
- Coordinates: 35.296014°N 69.653855°E
- Country: Afghanistan
- Province: Panjshir Province
- Current districts: Abshar and Dara
- Historical Hazara settlement: Before the 19th century (pre-Abdur Rahman Khan era)
- Elevation: 2,223 m (7,293 ft)

Population (Estimated, no official statistics)
  - Total: Unknown (currently inhabited by Hazaras and Tajiks)
- Demonym(s): Hazara (historically), Tajik (current majority)
- Time zone: UTC+4:30
- Based on local sources, historical documents, and oral traditions.

Dara-e Hazara (Persian: دره هزاره) also known as Darae Hazara or Hazara Valley is the historical name of a region that today is divided into two separate districts: Abshar and Darah in Panjshir Province, Afghanistan. In the past, this region was known as the "Valley of the Hazaras" due to the significant presence of the Hazara people. It has been referred to by this name in various local and historical sources.

== Location ==
The region is located in eastern Afghanistan, along the beautiful Panjshir Valley, and geographically forms part of the mountainous Hindu Kush range. The two current districts—Abshar and Darah—branch off from the northern areas of the main Panjshir Valley.

=== Neighboring areas ===
- North: Rukhah District
- South: Central Panjshir Valley
- West: Shotul District
- East: Border highlands of Nuristan and Badakhshan

=== Geographic features ===
- A mountainous region with deep valleys, freshwater springs, and narrow pathways following the course of the Panjshir River.
- Difficult access routes, which historically enabled the settlement of nomadic peoples, including the Hazaras.

== Historical background ==
Darah-e Hazara (Valley of the Hazaras) is a name that appears in various oral historical accounts, administrative documents from the era of Abdur Rahman Khan, and was commonly used by local people until the mid-20th century. In later periods—especially following the civil wars and political upheavals of the 20th century—the demographic structure of the region changed, and the name “Darah-e-Hazara” gradually fell out of official use.

- Pre-Islamic Era: The Hazara people of Darah-e-Hazara are believed to have inhabited this region since ancient times, even before the advent of Islam. Archaeological remains, such as the fire temples of Pay-Garmak and Parasto, indicate the existence of pre-Islamic civilizations in the area. At the entrance of the Pay-Garmak fire temple, there is also a “Nadā Mazār”—a type of early shrine—which is believed to date back to pre-Islamic times.
- Islamic Period: With the arrival of Islam, these communities gradually converted and are now followers of the Hanafi Sunni school. It is believed that the descendants of Baba Ali migrated from the hills of Kandahar to the Darah-e-Ghar-e-Jahra Ali area, leading to the eventual conversion of the local population to Islam.
- Other Historical Periods: In the past, Darah-e-Hazara was also known as "Banjar" or "Banjur". It is likely that the Banjur family, which established an independent kingdom in the north and south of the Hindukush, originated from this area. According to the historical records of Gardizi and Tabari, the last ruler of this dynasty, Hashim Banjuri, was overthrown by Yaqub al-Layth al-Saffar.

== District formation ==
In recent decades, this area was divided into two independent administrative units named Abshar District and Darah District. In the official administrative divisions of the Afghan government (after 2005), the historic name "Darah-e Hazara" is no longer used, but it still remains in the memory and speech of the older generation.

=== Participation in political and military developments ===
The Hazaras of Darah-e-Hazara played an active role in popular resistance movements, especially during the jihad against the Soviet invasion. Commanders such as Hayatullah Khan Sharifi emerged from this region and fought alongside Ahmad Shah Massoud on the frontlines of the resistance.

=== Villages ===
Some of the villages include: Dust Ali, Jehr Ali, Sangi Khan, Baba Ali (center), Qala Teri, Parangal, Shahr-e Ghalghala, Gulab Khil, Qash Daraz, Qalandor, Astana Kalan, Michit, Jar Shakh, Laleh Khil, Khwaja Ghar

=== Ethnic and cultural composition ===
Today, the majority of residents in these districts are Hazara and Tajik, but there are still signs of the earlier Hazara presence, such as village names, oral traditions, and some social structures.

Some of the old village names are also linked to the historical presence of the Hazara people.

== See also ==
- Hazara people of Panjshir
- Hazaristan

== Sources ==
- Historical Maps of Afghanistan (Pre-1950) — Some old maps recorded the name "Hazara Dara" or "Darrah Hazara" in Panjshir.
- Sayed Askar Mousavi – Hazaras in Contemporary Afghan History references the historical distribution of Hazaras in northeastern Afghanistan, including Panjshir.
- Raphael Lefevre – Afghanistan: Demographics and Power Structures analyzes ethnic structures of various Afghan provinces, with notes on contested identity regions.
- Dr. Alireza Farqani – Published articles on the political geography of Afghanistan's mountainous provinces, including historical analyses of administrative divisions and ethnic migrations.
- Hazara Oral History Project – Cultural Heritage Foundation's documented oral histories from elders of Bamyan, Parwan, and Panjshir on the historical presence of Hazaras.
- Afghanistan Research and Evaluation Unit (AREU) – Ethnographic reports from Panjshir and analyses of demographic changes.
- Historical Documents from the Abd al-Rahman Khan Era — Especially reports on the suppression and forced displacement of Hazaras to northern and eastern Afghanistan.
- Field interviews with elders from the Ashgar and Darah areas, 2019.
- Central Statistics Office of Afghanistan archives, pre-1978.
