= Yalquz Aghaj, Marand =

Village in East Azerbaijan province, Iran

Yalquz Aghaj Persian: یالقوزآغاج
- Village
- Location within Iran
- Coordinates: 38°29′05″N 45°39′08″E
- Country: Iran
- Province: East Azerbaijan
- County: Marand
- District: Koshksaray
- Rural District: Yalquz Aghaj

Population (2016)
  - Total: 3,537
- Time zone: UTC+3:30 (IRST)

Yalquz Aghaj (Persian: يالقوزاغاج) (Note: Also known as Yalghiz Aghaj, Yālgız Āghāj, Yalkız-agach, Yālqız Āghāj, Yālqìz Āqāch, and Yālqiz Āqāj; Turkish: Yalgız Ağac) is a village in, and the capital of, Yalquz Aghaj Rural District in Koshksaray District of Marand County, East Azerbaijan province, Iran.

== Demographics ==
=== Population ===
At the time of the 2006 National Census, the village's population was 3,208 in 820 households, when it was in Koshksaray Rural District of the Central District. The following census in 2011 counted 3,431 people in 984 households. The 2016 census measured the population of the village as 3,537 people in 1,064 households.

In 2020, the rural district was separated from the district in the formation of Koshksaray District, and Yalquz Aghaj was transferred to Yalquz Aghaj Rural District created in the new district.
