= Darvish Mohammad =

Village in East Azerbaijan province, Iran

Darvish Mohammad Persian: درويش محمد
- Village
- Location within Iran
- Coordinates: 38°28′37″N 45°37′00″E
- Country: Iran
- Province: East Azerbaijan
- County: Marand
- District: Koshksaray
- Rural District: Yalquz Aghaj

Population (2016)
  - Total: 437
- Time zone: UTC+3:30 (IRST)

Darvish Mohammad (Persian: درويش محمد) (Note: Also romanized as Darvīsh Moḩammad) is a village in Yalquz Aghaj Rural District of Koshksaray District in Marand County, East Azerbaijan province, Iran.

== Demographics ==
=== Population ===
At the time of the 2006 National Census, the village's population was 528 in 127 households, when it was in Koshksaray Rural District of the Central District. The following census in 2011 counted 519 people in 140 households. The 2016 census measured the population of the village as 437 people in 132 households.

In 2020, the rural district was separated from the district in the formation of Koshksaray District, and Darvish Mohammad was transferred to Yalquz Aghaj Rural District created in the new district.
