= Nowjeh Deh =

Nowjeh Deh or Nujeh Deh (Persian: نوجه ده), also rendered as Navadeh, may refer to various places in Iran:

- Nowjeh Deh, Ardabil
- Nujeh Deh, Heris, East Azerbaijan Province
- Nowjeh Deh, Shabestar, East Azerbaijan Province
- Nowjeh Deh, Tabriz, East Azerbaijan Province
- Nowjeh Deh Daraq, East Azerbaijan Province
- Nowjeh Deh-e Sadat, East Azerbaijan Province
- Nowjeh Deh-e Sheykhlar, East Azerbaijan Province
- Nujeh Deh-e Kuh, East Azerbaijan Province
- Nowjeh Deh-e Olya, East Azerbaijan Province
- Nowjeh Deh-ye Sofla, East Azerbaijan Province
