= Gezafer =

Village in East Azerbaijan province, Iran

Gezafer Persian: گزافر
- Village
- Location within Iran
- Coordinates: 38°27′00″N 45°24′04″E
- Country: Iran
- Province: East Azerbaijan
- County: Marand
- District: Koshksaray
- Rural District: Koshksaray

Population (2016)
  - Total: 730
- Time zone: UTC+3:30 (IRST)

Gezafer (Persian: گزافر) (Note: Also romanized as Gezāfer) is a village in Koshksaray Rural District of Koshksaray District in Marand County, East Azerbaijan province, Iran.

== Demographics ==
=== Population ===
At the time of the 2006 National Census, the village's population was 653 in 146 households, when it was in the Central District. The following census in 2011 counted 730 people in 202 households. The 2016 census measured the population of the village as 730 people in 239 households.

In 2020, the rural district was transferred to the newly formed Koshksaray District.
