= Havistin =

Havistin هاويستين
- Village
- Location within Iran
- Coordinates: 38°43′43″N 45°55′54″E
- Country: Iran
- Province: East Azerbaijan
- County: Marand
- Bakhsh: Central
- Rural District: Harzandat-e Sharqi

Population (2006)
  - Total: 330
- Time zone: UTC+3:30 (IRST)
  - Summer (DST): UTC+4:30 (IRDT)

Havistin (Persian: هاويستين, also Romanized as Hāvīstīn; also known as Havestīn and Havīstūn) is a village in Harzandat-e Sharqi Rural District, in the Central District of Marand County, East Azerbaijan Province, Iran. At the 2006 census, its population was 330, in 90 families.
