= Vanlujaq =

Village in East Azerbaijan province, Iran

Vanlujaq Persian: وانلوجق
- Village
- Location within Iran
- Coordinates: 38°27′02″N 45°31′35″E
- Country: Iran
- Province: East Azerbaijan
- County: Marand
- District: Koshksaray
- Rural District: Koshksaray

Population (2016)
  - Total: 1,302
- Time zone: UTC+3:30 (IRST)

Vanlujaq (Persian: وانلوجق) (Note: Also romanized asVānlūjaq and Vānlūjeq; also known as Dānlūjeq) is a village in Koshksaray Rural District of Koshksaray District in Marand County, East Azerbaijan province, Iran.

== Demographics ==
=== Population ===
At the time of the 2006 National Census, the village's population was 1,129 in 272 households, when it was in the Central District. The following census in 2011 counted 1,260 people in 351 households. The 2016 census measured the population of the village as 1,302 people in 371 households.

In 2020, the rural district was separated from the district in the formation of Koshksaray District.
