= Qarajeh =

Qarajeh (Persian: قراجه) may refer to various places in Iran:

- Qarajeh, Heris, East Azerbaijan Province
- Qarajeh, Meyaneh, East Azerbaijan Province
- Qarajeh-ye Feyzollah, East Azerbaijan Province
- Qarajeh Malek, East Azerbaijan Province
- Qarajeh-ye Mohammad, East Azerbaijan Province
- Qarajeh, North Khorasan
