= Jameeh Bozorg =

Jameeh Bozorg جامعه بزرگ
- Village
- Location within Iran
- Coordinates: 38°28′08″N 45°30′48″E
- Country: Iran
- Province: East Azerbaijan
- County: Marand
- Bakhsh: Central
- Rural District: Koshksaray

Population (2006)
  - Total: 819
- Time zone: UTC+3:30 (IRST)
  - Summer (DST): UTC+4:30 (IRDT)

Jameeh Bozorg (Persian: جامعه بزرگ, also Romanized as Jāme‘eh-ye Bozorg; also known as Jāmeh Bozorg and Jāme‘-ye Bozorg) is a village in Koshksaray Rural District, in the Central District of Marand County, East Azerbaijan Province, Iran. At the 2006 census, its population was 819, in 200 families.
