= Zamharir =

Zamharir زمهرير
- Village
- Location within Iran
- Coordinates: 38°38′38″N 45°50′25″E
- Country: Iran
- Province: East Azerbaijan
- County: Marand
- Bakhsh: Central
- Rural District: Zonuzaq

Population (2006)
  - Total: 162
- Time zone: UTC+3:30 (IRST)
  - Summer (DST): UTC+4:30 (IRDT)

Zamharir (Persian: زمهرير, also Romanized as Zamharīr; also known as Zamgari, Zamharī, and Zamharīz) is a village in Zonuzaq Rural District, in the Central District of Marand County, East Azerbaijan Province, Iran. At the 2006 census, its population was 162, in 64 families.

The water of the village is supplied from the Qarah Bolagh spring. Due to its significant height above the sea level, this village has cool air in summer and extreme cold in winter. This village is located near two high mountains.
