= Qapulukh =

Qapulukh قاپولوخ
- Village
- Location within Iran
- Coordinates: 38°33′37″N 45°20′12″E
- Country: Iran
- Province: East Azerbaijan
- County: Marand
- Bakhsh: Central
- Rural District: Koshksaray

Population (2006)
  - Total: 548
- Time zone: UTC+3:30 (IRST)
  - Summer (DST): UTC+4:30 (IRDT)

Qapulukh (Persian: قاپولوخ, also Romanized as Qāpūlūkh) is a village that is located in Koshksaray Rural District, in the Central District of Marand County, East Azerbaijan Province, Iran. At the time of the 2006 census, its population consisted of 548 people spread across 120 families.
