= Pir Eshaq =

Pir Eshaq پيراسحق
- Village
- Location within Iran
- Coordinates: 38°43′11″N 45°32′10″E
- Country: Iran
- Province: East Azerbaijan
- County: Marand
- Bakhsh: Central
- Rural District: Harzandat-e Gharbi

Population (2006)
  - Total: 20
- Time zone: UTC+3:30 (IRST)
  - Summer (DST): UTC+4:30 (IRDT)

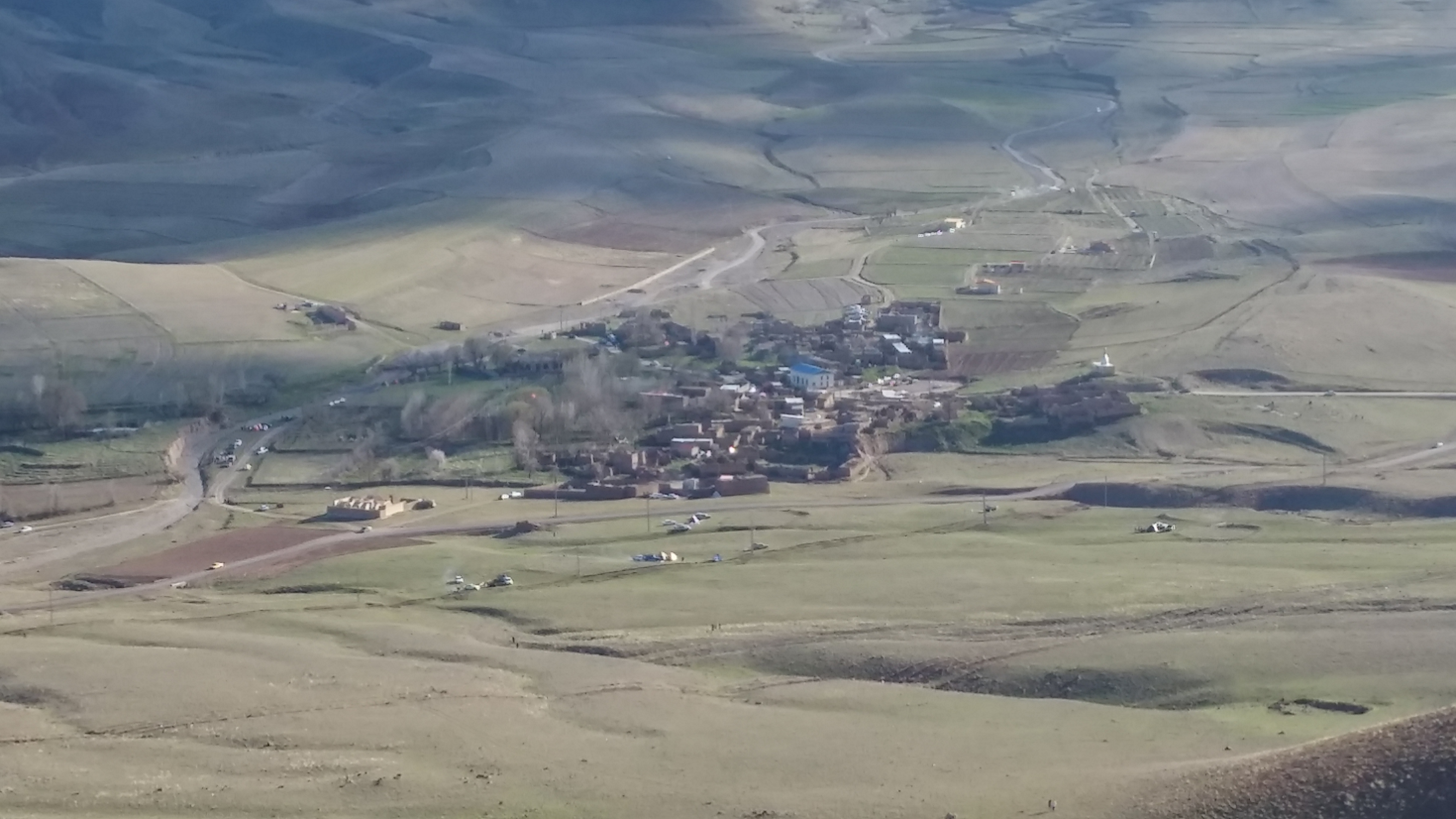

Pir Eshaq (Persian: پيراسحق, also Romanized as Pīr Esḩaq, Pīr Esḩāq, and Pīr Esḩáq) is a village in Harzandat-e Gharbi Rural District, in the Central District of Marand County, East Azerbaijan Province, Iran. At the 2006 census, its population was 20, in 5 families.
