= Ersi, Marand =

Village in East Azerbaijan province, Iran

Ersi Persian: ارسی
- Village
- Location within Iran
- Coordinates: 38°28′26″N 45°30′58″E
- Country: Iran
- Province: East Azerbaijan
- County: Marand
- District: Koshksaray
- Rural District: Koshksaray

Population (2016)
  - Total: 1,420
- Time zone: UTC+3:30 (IRST)

Ersi (Persian: ارسی) (Note: Also romanized as Ersī; also known as Arasi Hoomeh, Īrseh, and Orosī) is a village in Koshksaray Rural District of Koshksaray District in Marand County, East Azerbaijan province, Iran.

== Demographics ==
=== Population ===
At the time of the 2006 National Census, the village's population was 1,659 in 391 households, when it was in the Central District. The following census in 2011 counted 1,536 people in 416 households. The 2016 census measured the population of the village as 1,420 people in 423 households.

In 2020, the rural district was separated from the district in the formation of Koshksaray District.
