= Kuhnab =

Kuhnab كوهناب
- Village
- Location within Iran
- Coordinates: 38°30′30″N 45°56′00″E
- Country: Iran
- Province: East Azerbaijan
- County: Marand
- Bakhsh: Central
- Rural District: Dowlatabad

Population (2006)
  - Total: 188
- Time zone: UTC+3:30 (IRST)
  - Summer (DST): UTC+4:30 (IRDT)

Kuhnab (Persian: كوهناب, also Romanized as Kūhnāb and Koohnab; also known as Gaveh Now, Gav Now, Gūhnāb, Keyvānī, Kiavani, and Kyavany) is a village in Dowlatabad Rural District, in the Central District of Marand County, East Azerbaijan Province, Iran. At the 2006 census, its population was 188, in 51 families.
