= Aralan =

Village in East Azerbaijan province, Iran

Aralan Persian: ارلان
- Village
- Location within Iran
- Coordinates: 38°23′19″N 45°33′06″E
- Country: Iran
- Province: East Azerbaijan
- County: Marand
- District: Koshksaray
- Rural District: Koshksaray

Population (2016)
  - Total: 1,713
- Time zone: UTC+3:30 (IRST)

Aralan (Persian: ارلان) (Note: Also romanized as Aralān and Arlān) is a village in Koshksaray Rural District of Koshksaray District in Marand County, East Azerbaijan province, Iran.

== Demographics ==
=== Population ===
At the time of the 2006 National Census, the village's population was 1,983 in 524 households, when it was in the Central District. The following census in 2011 counted 1,752 people in 550 households. The 2016 census measured the population of the village as 1,713 people in 537 households.

In 2020, the rural district was separated from the district in the formation of Koshksaray District.
