= Chay Kasan =

Chay Kasan چايكسن
- Village
- Location within Iran
- Coordinates: 38°43′20″N 45°29′01″E
- Country: Iran
- Province: East Azerbaijan
- County: Marand
- Bakhsh: Central
- Rural District: Harzandat-e Gharbi

Population (2006)
  - Total: 122
- Time zone: UTC+3:30 (IRST)
  - Summer (DST): UTC+4:30 (IRDT)

Chay Kasan (Persian: چايكسن, also Romanized as Chāy Kasan; also known as Chāy Kand) is a village in Harzandat-e Gharbi Rural District, in the Central District of Marand County, East Azerbaijan Province, Iran. At the 2006 census, its population was 122, in 30 families.
