= Seyyedlu =

Seyyedlu سيدلو
- Village
- Location within Iran
- Coordinates: 38°36′53″N 45°21′24″E
- Country: Iran
- Province: East Azerbaijan
- County: Marand
- Bakhsh: Central
- Rural District: Koshksaray

Population (2006)
  - Total: 227
- Time zone: UTC+3:30 (IRST)
  - Summer (DST): UTC+4:30 (IRDT)

Seyyedlu (Persian: سيدلو, also Romanized as Seyyedlū; also known as Sa‘īdlū and Sūyedlū) is a village in Koshksaray Rural District, in the Central District of Marand County, East Azerbaijan Province, Iran. At the 2006 census, its population was 227, in 66 families.
