= Sorkheh, Marand =

Sorkheh سرخه
- Village
- Location within Iran
- Coordinates: 38°25′32″N 45°25′54″E
- Country: Iran
- Province: East Azerbaijan
- County: Marand
- Bakhsh: Central
- Rural District: Koshksaray

Population (2006)
  - Total: 376
- Time zone: UTC+3:30 (IRST)
  - Summer (DST): UTC+4:30 (IRDT)

Sorkheh (Persian: سرخه, also Romanized as Sarāy, Serar, and Seraz) is a village in Koshksaray Rural District, in the Central District of Marand County, East Azerbaijan Province, Iran. At the 2006 census, its population was 376, in 90 families.
