= Darah =

Darah may refer to:

== Films ==
- Macabre, a 2009 Indonesian film also known as Darah or Rumah Dara

== Places ==
- Darah, India, a village in Madhepur block, Madhubani District, Bihar
- Darah, Iran, a village in Zonuzaq Rural District, in the Central District of Marand County, East Azerbaijan Province, Iran
- Darah, Pakistan, a village in Khyber Pakhtunkhwa province of Pakistan
- Darah District, Panjshir Province, Afghanistan
