= Qermezi Qeshlaq =

Village in East Azerbaijan province, Iran

Qermezi Qeshlaq Persian: قرمزي قشلاق
- Village
- Location within Iran
- Coordinates: 38°27′11″N 45°26′39″E
- Country: Iran
- Province: East Azerbaijan
- County: Marand
- District: Koshksaray
- Rural District: Koshksaray

Population (2016)
  - Total: 824
- Time zone: UTC+3:30 (IRST)

Qermezi Qeshlaq (Persian: قرمزي قشلاق) (Note: Also romanized as Qermezī Qeshlāq; also known as Qezel Qeshlāq) is a village in Koshksaray Rural District of Koshksaray District in Marand County, East Azerbaijan province, Iran.

== Demographics ==
=== Population ===
At the time of the 2006 National Census, the village's population was 660 in 163 households, when it was in the Central District. The following census in 2011 counted 729 people in 197 households. The 2016 census measured the population of the village as 824 people in 231 households.

In 2020, the rural district was separated from the district in the formation of Koshksaray District.
