= Molla Yusof, East Azerbaijan =

Village in East Azerbaijan province, Iran

Molla Yusof Persian: ملايوسف
- Village
- Location within Iran
- Coordinates: 38°23′06″N 45°45′36″E
- Country: Iran
- Province: East Azerbaijan
- County: Marand
- District: Central
- Rural District: Mishab-e Shomali

Population (2016)
  - Total: 864
- Time zone: UTC+3:30 (IRST)

Molla Yusof (Persian: ملايوسف) (Note: Also romanized as Mollā Yūsef and Mollā Yūsof; also known as Mulla Yūsuf) is a village in Mishab-e Shomali Rural District of the Central District in Marand County, East Azerbaijan province, Iran.

== Demographics ==
=== Population ===
At the time of the 2006 National Census, the village's population was 511 in 164 households. The following census in 2011 counted 474 people in 166 households. The 2016 census measured the population of the village as 864 people in 187 households.
