= Piyam =

Village in East Azerbaijan province, Iran

Piyam Persian: پيام
- Village
- Location within Iran
- Coordinates: 38°21′21″N 45°48′45″E
- Country: Iran
- Province: East Azerbaijan
- County: Marand
- District: Central
- Rural District: Mishab-e Shomali

Population (2016)
  - Total: 1,135
- Time zone: UTC+3:30 (IRST)

Piyam (Persian: پيام) (Note: Also romanized as Piām and Pīyām; also known as Payām and Yām) is a village in Mishab-e Shomali Rural District of the Central District in Marand County, East Azerbaijan province, Iran.

== Demographics ==
=== Population ===
At the time of the 2006 National Census, the village's population was 1,389 in 336 households. The following census in 2011 counted 1,403 people in 392 households. The 2016 census measured the population of the village as 1,135 people in 349 households.
