= Mahbubabad, Iran =

Village in East Azerbaijan province, Iran

Mahbubabad Persian: محبوب اباد
- Village
- Location within Iran
- Coordinates: 38°23′01″N 45°38′55″E
- Country: Iran
- Province: East Azerbaijan
- County: Marand
- District: Central
- Rural District: Mishab-e Shomali

Population (2016)
  - Total: 1,181
- Time zone: UTC+3:30 (IRST)

Mahbubabad (Persian: محبوب اباد) (Note: Also romanized as Mahboob Abad and Maḩbūbābād; also known as Maḩbūbābāb and Makh-Baba) is a village in Mishab-e Shomali Rural District of the Central District in Marand County, East Azerbaijan province, Iran.

== Demographics ==
=== Population ===
At the time of the 2006 National Census, the village's population was 1,266 in 327 households. The following census in 2011 counted 1,148 people in 366 households. The 2016 census measured the population of the village as 1,181 people in 360 households.
