= Ordaklu, East Azerbaijan =

Village in East Azerbaijan province, Iran

Ordaklu Persian: اردكلو
- Village
- Location within Iran
- Coordinates: 38°25′33″N 45°48′23″E
- Country: Iran
- Province: East Azerbaijan
- County: Marand
- District: Central
- Rural District: Bonab

Population (2016)
  - Total: 5,985
- Time zone: UTC+3:30 (IRST)

Ordaklu (Persian: اردكلو) (Note: Also romanized as Ordaklū; also known as Erdaglyu) is a village in Bonab Rural District of the Central District in Marand County, East Azerbaijan province, Iran.

== Demographics ==
=== Population ===
At the time of the 2006 National Census, the village's population was 3,892 in 986 households. The following census in 2011 counted 5,133 people in 1,485 households. The 2016 census measured the population of the village as 5,985 people in 1,717 households. It was the most populous village in its rural district.
