= Galin Qiyeh =

Village in East Azerbaijan province, Iran

Galin Qiyeh Persian: گلين قيه
- Village
- Location within Iran
- Coordinates: 38°40′33″N 45°35′37″E
- Country: Iran
- Province: East Azerbaijan
- County: Marand
- District: Central
- Rural District: Harzandat-e Gharbi

Population (2016)
  - Total: 1,990
- Time zone: UTC+3:30 (IRST)

Galin Qiyeh (Persian: گلين قيه) (Note: Also romanized as Galīn Qīyeh; also known as Galin Qaya, Galin Qayah, Galīn Qayah, and Galīn Qayeh) is a village in, and the capital of, Harzandat-e Gharbi Rural District in the Central District of Marand County, East Azerbaijan province, Iran.

== Demographics ==
=== Language ===
The people of Galin Qiyeh speak the Harzandi dialect of the Tati language.

=== Population ===
At the time of the 2006 National Census, the village's population was 2,461 in 655 households. The following census in 2011 counted 2,326 people in 721 households. The 2016 census measured the population of the village as 1,990 people in 682 households. It was the most populous village in its rural district.
