= Dowlatabad, Marand =

Village in East Azerbaijan province, Iran

Dowlatabad Persian: دولت اباد
- Village
- Location within Iran
- Coordinates: 38°27′14″N 45°49′40″E
- Country: Iran
- Province: East Azerbaijan
- County: Marand
- District: Central
- Rural District: Dowlatabad

Population (2016)
  - Total: 3,868
- Time zone: UTC+3:30 (IRST)

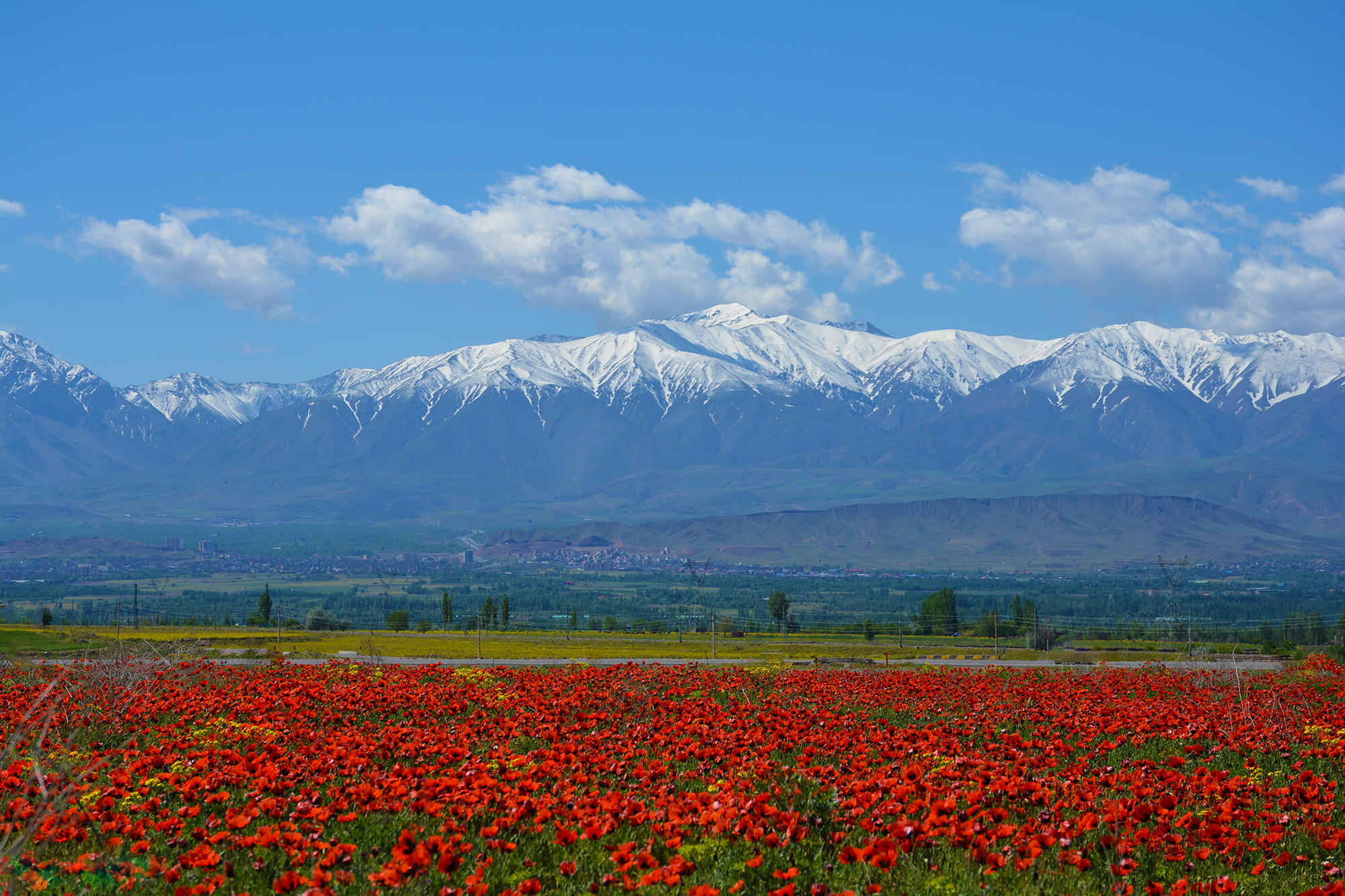
Marand (2015)

Dowlatabad (Persian: دولت اباد) (Note: Also romanized as Daulatābād, Dowlatābād, and Dovletābād) is a village in, and the capital of, Dowlatabad Rural District in the Central District of Marand County, East Azerbaijan province, Iran.

== Demographics ==
=== Population ===
At the time of the 2006 National Census, the village's population was 3,864 in 976 households. The following census in 2011 counted 3,728 people in 1,087 households. The 2016 census measured the population of the village as 3,868 people in 1,185 households. It was the most populous village in its rural district.
