= Tazeh Kand-e Akhvond =

Village in East Azerbaijan province, Iran

Tazeh Kand-e Akhvond Persian: تازه كنداخوند
- Village
- Location within Iran
- Coordinates: 38°32′03″N 45°42′48″E
- Country: Iran
- Province: East Azerbaijan
- County: Marand
- District: Central
- Rural District: Dowlatabad

Population (2016)
  - Total: 2,450
- Time zone: UTC+3:30 (IRST)

Tazeh Kand-e Akhvond (Persian: تازه كنداخوند) (Note: Also romanized as Tāzeh Kand Ākhūnd and Tāzeh Kand-e Ākhvond; also known as Tazakend, Tāzeh Kand, and Tazeh Kand Alamdar) is a village in Dowlatabad Rural District of the Central District in Marand County, East Azerbaijan province, Iran.

== Demographics ==
=== Population ===
At the time of the 2006 National Census, the village's population was 2,832 in 653 households. The following census in 2011 counted 2,903 people in 783 households. The 2016 census measured the population of the village as 2,450 people in 681 households.
