= Dugijan =

Village in East Azerbaijan province, Iran

Dugijan Persian: دوگيجان
- Village
- Location within Iran
- Coordinates: 38°31′05″N 46°02′52″E
- Country: Iran
- Province: East Azerbaijan
- County: Marand
- District: Central
- Rural District: Bonab

Population (2016)
  - Total: 841
- Time zone: UTC+3:30 (IRST)

Dugijan (Persian: دوگيجان) (Note: Also romanized as Dūgījān; also known as Dogījān, Doki Jan, Dovayjān, Dūkejān, Dūkījān, and Dyugidzhan) is a village in Bonab Rural District of the Central District in Marand County, East Azerbaijan province, Iran.

== Demographics ==
=== Population ===
At the time of the 2006 National Census, the village's population was 895 in 180 households. The following census in 2011 counted 876 people in 220 households. The 2016 census measured the population of the village as 841 people in 229 households.
