= Anamoq =

Village in East Azerbaijan province, Iran

Anamoq Persian: انامق
- Village
- Location within Iran
- Coordinates: 38°23′21″N 45°41′00″E
- Country: Iran
- Province: East Azerbaijan
- County: Marand
- District: Central
- Rural District: Mishab-e Shomali

Population (2016)
  - Total: 1,452
- Time zone: UTC+3:30 (IRST)

Anamoq (Persian: انامق) (Note: Also romanized as Anāmaq, Anāmeq, and Anāmoq; also known as Anama) is a village in Mishab-e Shomali Rural District of the Central District in Marand County, East Azerbaijan province, Iran.

== Demographics ==
=== Population ===
At the time of the 2006 National Census, the village's population was 1,494 in 389 households. The following census in 2011 counted 1,420 people in 423 households. The 2016 census measured the population of the village as 1,452 people in 437 households.
