= Sari Tappeh =

Village in East Azerbaijan province, Iran

Sari Tappeh Persian: ساری‌تپه
- Village
- Location within Iran
- Coordinates: 38°30′28″N 45°48′38″E
- Country: Iran
- Province: East Azerbaijan
- County: Marand
- District: Central
- Rural District: Dowlatabad

Population (2016)
  - Total: 558
- Time zone: UTC+3:30 (IRST)

Sari Tappeh (Persian: ساری‌تپه) (Note: Also romanized as Sārī Tappeh; also known as Sar Tappeh, Sardaba, Sardābeh, and Sari Tepe) is a village in Dowlatabad Rural District of the Central District in Marand County, East Azerbaijan province, Iran.

== Demographics ==
=== Population ===
At the time of the 2006 National Census, the village's population was 461 in 126 households. The following census in 2011 counted 410 people in 115 households. The 2016 census measured the population of the village as 558 people in 149 households.
