= Babereh-ye Olya =

Babereh-ye Olya بابره عليا
- Village
- Location within Iran
- Coordinates: 38°40′47″N 45°44′24″E
- Country: Iran
- Province: East Azerbaijan
- County: Marand
- Bakhsh: Central
- Rural District: Harzandat-e Sharqi

Population (2006)
  - Total: 263
- Time zone: UTC+3:30 (IRST)
  - Summer (DST): UTC+4:30 (IRDT)

Babereh-ye Olya (Persian: بابره عليا, also Romanized as Bābareh-ye ‘Olyā; also known as Bābereh, Bābereh-ye Bālā, and Bābertīn-e ‘Olyā) is a village in Harzandat-e Sharqi Rural District, in the Central District of Marand County, East Azerbaijan Province, Iran. At the 2006 census, its population was 263, in 65 families.
