= Baz Mohammad Mubariz =

- Born: Sangi Khan, Abshar District, Panjshir Province, Afghanistan
- Native name: بازمحمد مبارز
- Nationality: Hazara
- Style: Mixed martial arts (MMA), Muay Thai, Boxing
- Team: Afghanistan MMA Federation
- Years active: 2000s–present

Other information
- Occupation: Athlete, coach, sports administrator

Baz Mohammad Mubariz (born 1990 in Panjshir Province) is an Afghan mixed martial artist (MMA), Muay Thai practitioner, and sports administrator.

Mubariz is one of the founders of the Afghanistan MMA Federation and served for several years as President of the Afghanistan Martial Arts Federation.

== Early life and martial arts career ==
Baz Mohammad Mubariz was born in the village of Sangi Khan in Abshar District, Panjshir Province. He was born into a Hazara family and began training in various combat sports during his youth, including boxing, jujutsu, Muay Thai, and mixed martial arts. During the 2000s, he became recognized as one of the pioneers of MMA in Afghanistan and played a role in the establishment of the Afghanistan MMA Federation in 2008.

In the following years, he organized several combat sports events, including the Afghanistan Fighting Championship, and contributed to the development of mixed martial arts among Afghan youth.

== Administrative career ==
In addition to his professional fighting career, Mubariz served as President of the Afghanistan Martial Arts Federation. In 2022, he resigned from the position, citing administrative challenges and interference in the affairs of sports federations.

=== Professional career ===
Mubariz has competed in international MMA events in several countries. In 2024, after a number of years away from professional competition, he returned to action under the M2MMA promotion in Thailand, defeating French fighter Johan Van Diehl by judges' decision. The victory was recorded as his twelfth professional win.

In 2025, he made his professional Muay Thai debut in Thailand and defeated his Bahraini-Iranian opponent, Mostafa, by knockout in the third round.

Mubariz is regarded as one of the influential figures in Afghan combat sports. Through his athletic and administrative activities, he has played a significant role in promoting and developing mixed martial arts in Afghanistan, inspiring a new generation of Afghan fighters.

== See also ==
- Mixed martial arts in Afghanistan
- Hazaras of Panjshir
