= Kuh Kamar, East Azerbaijan =

Village in East Azerbaijan province, Iran

Kuh Kamar Persian: کوه‌کمر
- Village
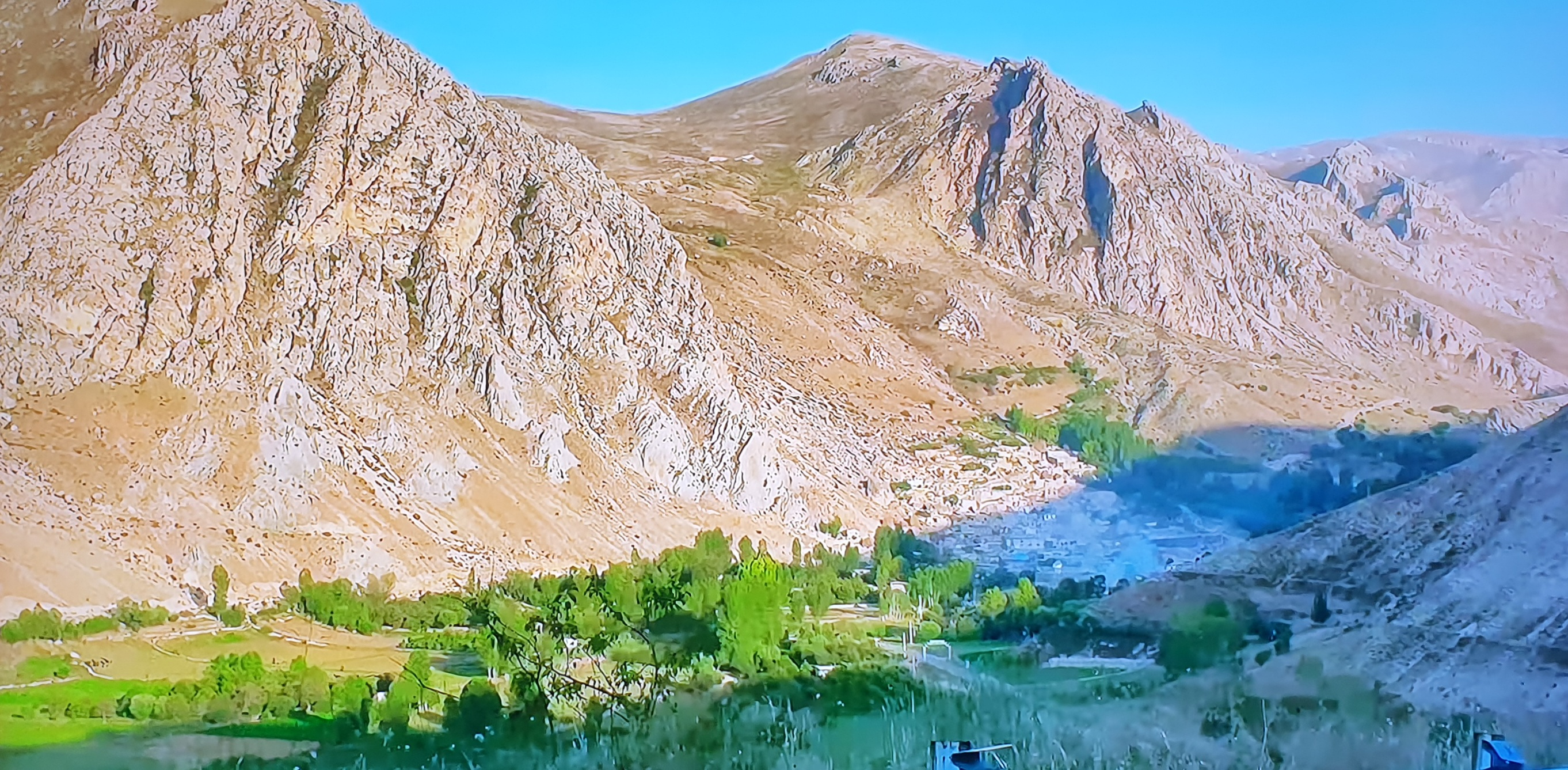

- Location within Iran
- Coordinates: 38°39′00″N 45°58′37″E
- Country: Iran
- Province: East Azerbaijan
- County: Marand
- District: Central
- Rural District: Zonuzaq

Population (2016)
  - Total: 378
- Time zone: UTC+3:30 (IRST)

Kuh Kamar (Persian: کوه‌کمر) (Note: Also romanized as Kooh Kamar and Kūh Kamar; also known as Chyuchamar, Kūkamar, and Kukomar) is a village in Zonuzaq Rural District of the Central District in Marand County, East Azerbaijan province, Iran.

== Demographics ==
=== Population ===
At the time of the 2006 National Census, the village's population was 861 in 182 households. The following census in 2011 counted 705 people in 198 households. The 2016 census measured the population of the village as 378 people in 105 households.
