= Yalquz Aghaj Rural District =

Rural district in East Azerbaijan province, Iran

Yalquz Aghaj Rural District Persian: دهستان یالقوزآغاج
- Rural District
- Location within Iran
- Coordinates: 38°28′N 45°39′E
- Country: Iran
- Province: East Azerbaijan
- County: Marand
- District: Koshksaray
- Established: 2020
- Capital: Yalquz Aghaj
- Time zone: UTC+3:30 (IRST)

Yalquz Aghaj Rural District (Persian: دهستان یالقوزآغاج) is in Koshksaray District of Marand County, East Azerbaijan province, Iran. Its capital is the village of Yalquz Aghaj, whose population at the time of the 2016 National Census was 3,537 people in 1,064 households.

== History ==
In 2020, Koshksaray Rural District and the city of Koshksaray were separated from the Central District in the formation of Koshksaray District, and Yalquz Aghaj Rural District was created in the new district.

== Other villages in the rural district ==
- Darvish Mohammad
- Ilat-e Yalquz Aghaj
