= Harzand =

Harzand (Persian: هرزند) may refer to:

- Harzand-e Atiq
- Harzand-e Jadid
- Harzand Station
- Harzand (horse)
