= Kandar, Pakistan =

Kandar
- Location within Pakistan
- Coordinates: 34.06°N 73.09°E
- Country: Pakistan
- Province: Khyber-Pakhtunkhwa
- Elevation: 1,209 m (3,967 ft)
- Time zone: UTC+5 (PST)

Kandar is a village in Abbottabad District of Khyber-Pakhtunkhwa. It is located at 34°6'40N 73°9'25E with an altitude of 1209 metres (3969 feet). Neighbouring settlements include Chhar, Batangi and Jandala.
