= Dizaj Hoseyn Beyg =

City in East Azerbaijan province, Iran

Dizaj Hoseyn Beyg Persian: ديزج حسين بيگ
- City
- Location within Iran
- Coordinates: 38°28′04″N 45°37′01″E
- Country: Iran
- Province: East Azerbaijan
- County: Marand
- District: Koshksaray
- Established as a city: 2021

Population (2016)
  - Total: 4,060
- Time zone: UTC+3:30 (IRST)

Dizaj Hoseyn Beyg (Persian: ديزج حسين بيگ) (Note: Also romanized as Dīzaj Ḩoseyn Beyg and Dīzaj-e Ḩoseyn Beyg; also known as Dīzaj-e Ḩoseyn Beyk, Dizaj Hosein Beik, Dīzaj Ḩosey Beyk, Dīzeh Ḩoseyn Bag, Ḩoseyn Beyg Dīzeh, Ḩoseyn Beyk Dīzeh, Hussain Beg Dīzeh, and Usenbay-Diza) is a city in Koshksaray District of Marand County, East Azerbaijan province, Iran.

== Demographics ==
=== Population ===
At the time of the 2006 National Census, Dizaj Hoseyn Beyg's population was 3,764 in 963 households, when it was a village in Koshksaray Rural District of the Central District. The following census in 2011 counted 3,916 people in 1,153 households. The 2016 census measured the population of the village as 4,060 people in 1,273 households. It was the most populous village in its rural district.

In 2020, the rural district was separated from the district in the formation of Koshksaray District, and Dizaj Hoseyn Beyg was transferred to Yalquz Aghaj Rural District created in the new district. The village was converted to a city in 2021.
