= Oryan Tappeh =

Village in East Azerbaijan province, Iran

Oryan Tappeh Persian: آیران دیبی
- Village
- Location within Iran
- Coordinates: 38°42′09″N 45°39′54″E
- Country: Iran
- Province: East Azerbaijan
- County: Marand
- District: Central
- Rural District: Harzandat-e Gharbi

Population (2016)
  - Total: 1,524
- Time zone: UTC+3:30 (IRST)

Oryan Tappeh (Persian: عريان تپه) (Note: Also romanized as Orīyān Tappeh, ‘Oryān Tapeh, and ‘Oryān Tappeh) is a village in Harzandat-e Gharbi Rural District of the Central District in Marand County, East Azerbaijan province, Iran.

== Population ==
At the time of the 2006 National Census, the village's population was 1,499 in 357 households. The following census in 2011 counted 1,535 people in 471 households. The 2016 census measured the population of the village as 1,524 people in 509 households.
