= Bahram, East Azerbaijan =

Village in East Azerbaijan province, Iran

Bahram Persian: بهرام
- Village
- Location within Iran
- Coordinates: 38°26′05″N 45°42′57″E
- Country: Iran
- Province: East Azerbaijan
- County: Marand
- District: Central
- Rural District: Mishab-e Shomali

Population (2016)
  - Total: 1,322
- Time zone: UTC+3:30 (IRST)

Bahram (Persian: بهرام) (Note: Also romanized as Bahrām; also known as Bagram and Bairam) is a village in Mishab-e Shomali Rural District of the Central District in Marand County, East Azerbaijan province, Iran.

== Demographics ==
=== Population ===
At the time of the 2006 National Census, the village's population was 1,573 in 373 households. The following census in 2011 counted 1,329 people in 370 households. The 2016 census measured the population of the village as 1,322 people in 384 households.
