= Asdaghi =

Village in East Azerbaijan province, Iran

Asdaghi Persian: اسداغي
- Village
- Location within Iran
- Coordinates: 38°23′47″N 45°52′42″E
- Country: Iran
- Province: East Azerbaijan
- County: Marand
- District: Central
- Rural District: Bonab

Population (2016)
  - Total: 699
- Time zone: UTC+3:30 (IRST)

Asdaghi (Persian: اسداغي) (Note: Also romanized as Āsdāghī) is a village in Bonab Rural District of the Central District in Marand County, East Azerbaijan province, Iran.

== Demographics ==
=== Population ===
At the time of the 2006 National Census, the village's population was 576 in 185 households. The following census in 2011 counted 658 people in 211 households. The 2016 census measured the population of the village as 699 people in 231 households.
