= Eyshabad, East Azerbaijan =

Village in East Azerbaijan province, Iran

Eyshabad Persian: عيش اباد
- Village
- Location within Iran
- Coordinates: 38°22′22″N 45°36′45″E
- Country: Iran
- Province: East Azerbaijan
- County: Marand
- District: Central
- Rural District: Mishab-e Shomali

Population (2016)
  - Total: 335
- Time zone: UTC+3:30 (IRST)

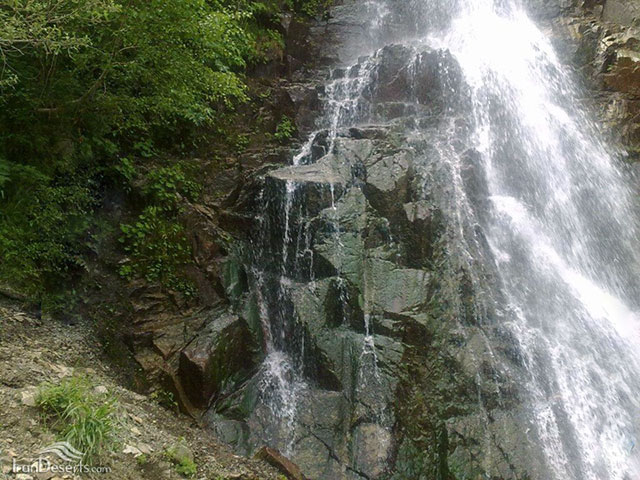

Eyshabad (Persian: عيش اباد) (Note: Also romanized as ‘Eyshābād; also known as Eshavand and Eshavat) is a village in Mishab-e Shomali Rural District of the Central District in Marand County, East Azerbaijan province, Iran.

== Demographics ==
=== Population ===
At the time of the 2006 National Census, the village's population was 339 in 103 households. The following census in 2011 counted 345 people in 111 households. The 2016 census measured the population of the village as 335 people in 111 households.
