= Zanjireh, East Azerbaijan =

Village in East Azerbaijan province, Iran

Zanjireh Persian: زنجيره
- Village
- Location within Iran
- Coordinates: 38°27′23″N 45°21′58″E
- Country: Iran
- Province: East Azerbaijan
- County: Marand
- District: Koshksaray
- Rural District: Koshksaray

Population (2016)
  - Total: 2,597
- Time zone: UTC+3:30 (IRST)

Zanjireh (Persian: زنجيره) (Note: Also romanized as Zanjirah and Zanjīreh; also known as Zandzhira and Zanjira) is a village in, and the capital of, Koshksaray Rural District in Koshksaray District of Marand County, East Azerbaijan province, Iran. The previous capital of the rural district was the city of Koshksaray.

== Demographics ==
=== Population ===
At the time of the 2006 National Census, the village's population was 2,486 in 524 households, when it was in the Central District. The following census in 2011 counted 2,556 people in 684 households. The 2016 census measured the population of the village as 2,597 people in 751 households.

In 2020, the rural district was separated from the district in the formation of Koshksaray District.
