= Nowjeh Deh Daraq =

Nowjeh Deh Daraq نوجه ده درق
- Village
- Location within Iran
- Coordinates: 38°25′09″N 45°58′48″E
- Country: Iran
- Province: East Azerbaijan
- County: Marand
- Bakhsh: Central
- Rural District: Bonab

Population (2006)
  - Total: 97
- Time zone: UTC+3:30 (IRST)
  - Summer (DST): UTC+4:30 (IRDT)

Nowjeh Deh Daraq (Persian: نوجه ده درق, also Romanized as Nowjeh Deh Daraq and Nowjeh-ye Deh Daraq; also known as Darreh Noqadī Mollā Yaḩyá, Darreh Nowqadī Mollā Yaḩyá, Noojeh Deh Daragh, Tūrān Now Deh, and Turan-Nuvedi) is a village in Bonab Rural District, in the Central District of Marand County, East Azerbaijan Province, Iran. At the 2006 census, its population was 97, in 28 families.
