= Kondelaj =

Village in East Azerbaijan province, Iran

Kondelaj Persian: کوللی کندی
- Village
- Location within Iran
- Coordinates: 38°23′43″N 45°45′03″E
- Country: Iran
- Province: East Azerbaijan
- County: Marand
- District: Central
- Rural District: Mishab-e Shomali

Population (2016)
  - Total: 1,745
- Time zone: UTC+3:30 (IRST)

Kondelaj (Persian: كندلج) (Note: Also romanized as Kandalaj, Kandlaj, and Kandlej; also known as Kulli) is a village in, and the capital of, Mishab-e Shomali Rural District in the Central District of Marand County, East Azerbaijan province, Iran.

== Demographics ==
=== Population ===
At the time of the 2006 National Census, the village's population was 2,025 in 602 households. The following census in 2011 counted 2,422 people in 634 households. The 2016 census measured the population of the village as 1,745 people in 583 households.
