= Qarajeh-ye Mohammad =

Village in East Azerbaijan province, Iran

Qarajeh-ye Mohammad Persian: قراجه محمد
- Village
- Location within Iran
- Coordinates: 38°29′01″N 45°32′54″E
- Country: Iran
- Province: East Azerbaijan
- County: Marand
- District: Koshksaray
- Rural District: Koshksaray

Population (2016)
  - Total: 1,455
- Time zone: UTC+3:30 (IRST)

Qarajeh-ye Mohammad (Persian: قراجه محمد) (Note: Also romanized as Qarājeh Moḩammad and Qarājeh-ye Moḩammad; also known as Gharajeh Mohammad, Qarajeh, and Verkhnyaya Karadzha) is a village in Koshksaray Rural District of Koshksaray District in Marand County, East Azerbaijan province, Iran.

== Demographics ==
=== Population ===
At the time of the 2006 National Census, the village's population was 1,396 in 343 households, when it was in the Central District. The following census in 2011 counted 1,397 people in 407 households. The 2016 census measured the population of the village as 1,455 people in 447 households.

In 2020, the rural district was separated from the district in the formation of Koshksaray District.
