= Babereh =

Babereh (Persian: بابره), also known as Babertin, may refer to:

- Babereh-ye Olya
- Babereh-ye Sofla
