= Javash =

Village in East Azerbaijan province, Iran

Javash Persian: جواش
- Village
- Location within Iran
- Coordinates: 38°24′12″N 45°50′25″E
- Country: Iran
- Province: East Azerbaijan
- County: Marand
- District: Central
- Rural District: Bonab

Population (2016)
  - Total: 833
- Time zone: UTC+3:30 (IRST)

Javash (Persian: جواش) (Note: Also romanized as Javāsh and Jevāsh) is a village in Bonab Rural District of the Central District in Marand County, East Azerbaijan province, Iran.

== Demographics ==
=== Population ===
At the time of the 2006 National Census, the village's population was 927 in 230 households. The following census in 2011 counted 1,183 people in 279 households. The 2016 census measured the population of the village as 833 people in 265 households.
