= Harzandat =

Harzandat (Persian: هرزندات) may refer to:

- Harzandat-e Gharbi Rural District
- Harzandat-e Sharqi Rural District
