= Goljar =

Village in East Azerbaijan province, Iran

Goljar Persian: گلجار
- Village
- Location within Iran
- Coordinates: 38°21′41″N 45°42′36″E
- Country: Iran
- Province: East Azerbaijan
- County: Marand
- District: Central
- Rural District: Mishab-e Shomali

Population (2016)
  - Total: 465
- Time zone: UTC+3:30 (IRST)

Goljar (Persian: گلجار) (Note: Also romanized as Goljār) is a village in Mishab-e Shomali Rural District of the Central District in Marand County, East Azerbaijan province, Iran.

== Demographics ==
=== Population ===
At the time of the 2006 National Census, the village's population was 602 in 156 households. The following census in 2011 counted 498 people in 153 households. The 2016 census measured the population of the village as 465 people in 148 households.
