= Hujqan =

Village in East Azerbaijan province, Iran

Hujqan Persian: هوجقان
- Village
- Location within Iran
- Coordinates: 38°26′23″N 45°50′06″E
- Country: Iran
- Province: East Azerbaijan
- County: Marand
- District: Central
- Rural District: Dowlatabad

Population (2016)
  - Total: 1,705
- Time zone: UTC+3:30 (IRST)

Hujqan (Persian: هوجقان) (Note: Also romanized as Hūjqān; also known as Howchqān and Hūchqān) is a village in Dowlatabad Rural District of the Central District in Marand County, East Azerbaijan province, Iran.

== Demographics ==
=== Population ===
At the time of the 2006 National Census, the village's population was 1,913 in 515 households. The following census in 2011 counted 1,799 people in 583 households. The 2016 census measured the population of the village as 1,705 people in 568 households.
