= Dizaj-e Olya =

Village in East Azerbaijan province, Iran

Dizaj-e Olya Persian: ديزج عليا
- Village
- Location within Iran
- Coordinates: 38°23′55″N 45°46′44″E
- Country: Iran
- Province: East Azerbaijan
- County: Marand
- District: Central
- Rural District: Mishab-e Shomali

Population (2016)
  - Total: 2,925
- Time zone: UTC+3:30 (IRST)

Dizaj-e Olya (Persian: ديزج عليا) (Note: Also romanized as Dīzaj ‘Olya, Dīzaj-e ‘Olyā, Dīzaj-e Olyā, and Dizj Olya; also known as Dīzaj, Dīzaj-e Bālā, and Dīzeh) is a village in Mishab-e Shomali Rural District of the Central District in Marand County, East Azerbaijan province, Iran.

== Demographics ==
=== Population ===
At the time of the 2006 National Census, the village's population was 1,752 in 535 households. The following census in 2011 counted 2,084 people in 593 households. The 2016 census measured the population of the village as 2,925 people in 884 households. It was the most populous village in its rural district.
