= Zarghan, East Azerbaijan =

Village in East Azerbaijan province, Iran

Zarghan Persian: زرغان
- Village
- Location within Iran
- Coordinates: 38°27′03″N 46°01′34″E
- Country: Iran
- Province: East Azerbaijan
- County: Marand
- District: Central
- Rural District: Bonab

Population (2016)
  - Total: 613
- Time zone: UTC+3:30 (IRST)

Zarghan (Persian: زرغان) (Note: Also romanized as Zarghān; also known as Zālenjeh, Zalinja, Zalīnjeh, Zaragan, Zaraqān, and Zarqān) is a village in Bonab Rural District of the Central District in Marand County, East Azerbaijan province, Iran.

== Demographics ==
=== Population ===
At the time of the 2006 National Census, the village's population was 801 in 206 households. The following census in 2011 counted 818 people in 224 households. The 2016 census measured the population of the village as 613 people in 193 households.
