= Pir Bala =

Village in East Azerbaijan province, Iran

Pir Bala Persian: پيربالا
- Village
- Location within Iran
- Coordinates: 38°22′41″N 45°35′24″E
- Country: Iran
- Province: East Azerbaijan
- County: Marand
- District: Central
- Rural District: Mishab-e Shomali

Population (2016)
  - Total: 811
- Time zone: UTC+3:30 (IRST)

Pir Bala (Persian: پيربالا) (Note: Also romanized as Pīr Bālā) is a village in Mishab-e Shomali Rural District of the Central District in Marand County, East Azerbaijan province, Iran.

== Demographics ==
=== Population ===
At the time of the 2006 National Census, the village's population was 858 in 249 households. The following census in 2011 counted 789 people in 258 households. The 2016 census measured the population of the village as 811 people in 270 households.
