= Bangin =

Village in East Azerbaijan province, Iran

Bangin Persian: بنگين
- Village
- Location within Iran
- Coordinates: 38°26′53″N 45°48′44″E
- Country: Iran
- Province: East Azerbaijan
- County: Marand
- District: Central
- Rural District: Dowlatabad

Population (2016)
  - Total: 1,214
- Time zone: UTC+3:30 (IRST)

Bangin (Persian: بنگين) (Note: Also romanized as Bangīn; also known as Bangī, Bankīn, Banmakīn, and Pan’gi) is a village in Dowlatabad Rural District of the Central District in Marand County, East Azerbaijan province, Iran.

== Demographics ==
=== Population ===
At the time of the 2006 National Census, the village's population was 992 in 265 households. The following census in 2011 counted 1,186 people in 351 households. The 2016 census measured the population of the village as 1,214 people in 375 households.
