= Korrab, East Azerbaijan =

Village in East Azerbaijan province, Iran

Korrab Persian: كراب
- Village
- Location within Iran
- Coordinates: 38°41′55″N 45°34′45″E
- Country: Iran
- Province: East Azerbaijan
- County: Marand
- District: Central
- Rural District: Harzandat-e Gharbi

Population (2016)
  - Total: 299
- Time zone: UTC+3:30 (IRST)

Korrab (Persian: كراب) (Note: Also romanized as 'Korab and Korrāb) is a village in Harzandat-e Gharbi Rural District of the Central District in Marand County, East Azerbaijan province, Iran.

== Population ==
At the time of the 2006 National Census, the village's population was 528 in 145 households. The following census in 2011 counted 367 people in 128 households. The 2016 census measured the population of the village as 299 people in 119 households.
