= Zonuzaq =

Village in East Azerbaijan province, Iran

Zonuzaq Persian: زنوزق
- Village
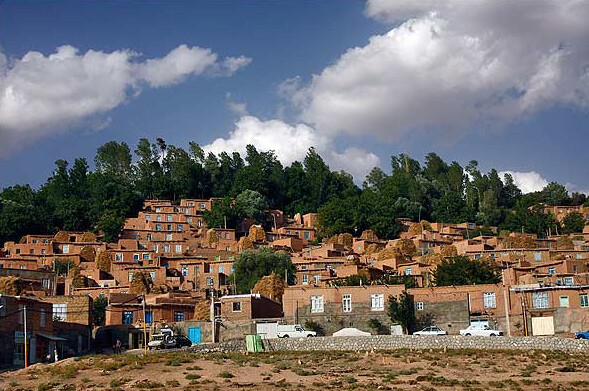
- View of Zonozaq village

- Location within Iran
- Coordinates: 38°35′32″N 45°51′09″E
- Country: Iran
- Province: East Azerbaijan
- County: Marand
- District: Central
- Rural District: Zonuzaq

Population (2016)
  - Total: 1,052
- Time zone: UTC+3:30 (IRST)

Zonuzaq (Persian: زنوزق) (Note: Also romanized as Zonūzaq; also known as Zonūzākh, and Zunuzakh) is a village in, and the capital of, Zonuzaq Rural District in the Central District of Marand County, East Azerbaijan province, Iran. Zonuzaq is famous for the stepwise architecture of its houses.

== Demographics ==
=== Population ===
At the time of the 2006 National Census, the village's population was 1,567 in 397 households. The following census in 2011 counted 1,287 people in 406 households. The 2016 census measured the population of the village as 1,052 people in 354 households. It was the most populous village in its rural district.
