= Zal, Iran =

Village in East Azerbaijan province, Iran

Zal Persian: زال
- Village
- Location within Iran
- Coordinates: 38°42′47″N 45°35′41″E
- Country: Iran
- Province: East Azerbaijan
- County: Marand
- District: Central
- Rural District: Harzandat-e Gharbi

Population (2016)
  - Total: 383
- Time zone: UTC+3:30 (IRST)

Zal (Persian: زال) (Note: Also romanized as Zāl) is a village in Harzandat-e Gharbi Rural District of the Central District in Marand County, East Azerbaijan province, Iran.

== Population ==
At the time of the 2006 National Census, the village's population was 453 in 138 households. The following census in 2011 counted 446 people in 177 households. The 2016 census measured the population of the village as 383 people in 144 households.
