= Nowjeh Deh-e Sheykhlar =

Nowjeh Deh-e Sheykhlar نوجه ده شيخلر
- Village
- Location within Iran
- Coordinates: 38°29′21″N 45°57′44″E
- Country: Iran
- Province: East Azerbaijan
- County: Marand
- Bakhsh: Central
- Rural District: Dowlatabad

Population (2006)
  - Total: 303
- Time zone: UTC+3:30 (IRST)
  - Summer (DST): UTC+4:30 (IRDT)

Nowjeh Deh-e Sheykhlar (Persian: نوجه ده شيخلر, also Romanized as Nowjeh Deh-e Sheykhlar, Nowjeh Deh Sheykhlar, and Nowjeh Deh-ye Sheykhlar; also known as Nojeh Deh Shīkhlar, Nuvedi, Sheykhlar, and Sheykhlar Noqadī) is a village in Dowlatabad Rural District, in the Central District of Marand County, East Azerbaijan Province, Iran. At the 2006 census, its population was 303, in 68 families.
