= Qeinar =

Qeinar قینر
- village
- Qeinar
- Location within Iran
- Coordinates: 38°26′31″N 46°09′20″E
- Country: Iran
- Province: East Azerbaijan
- County: Marand
- Bakhsh: Central
- Rural District: Bonab

Population (2006)
  - Total: 435
- Time zone: UTC+3:30 (IRST)
  - Summer (DST): UTC+4:30 (IRDT)
- Website: http://www.Qeinar.ir

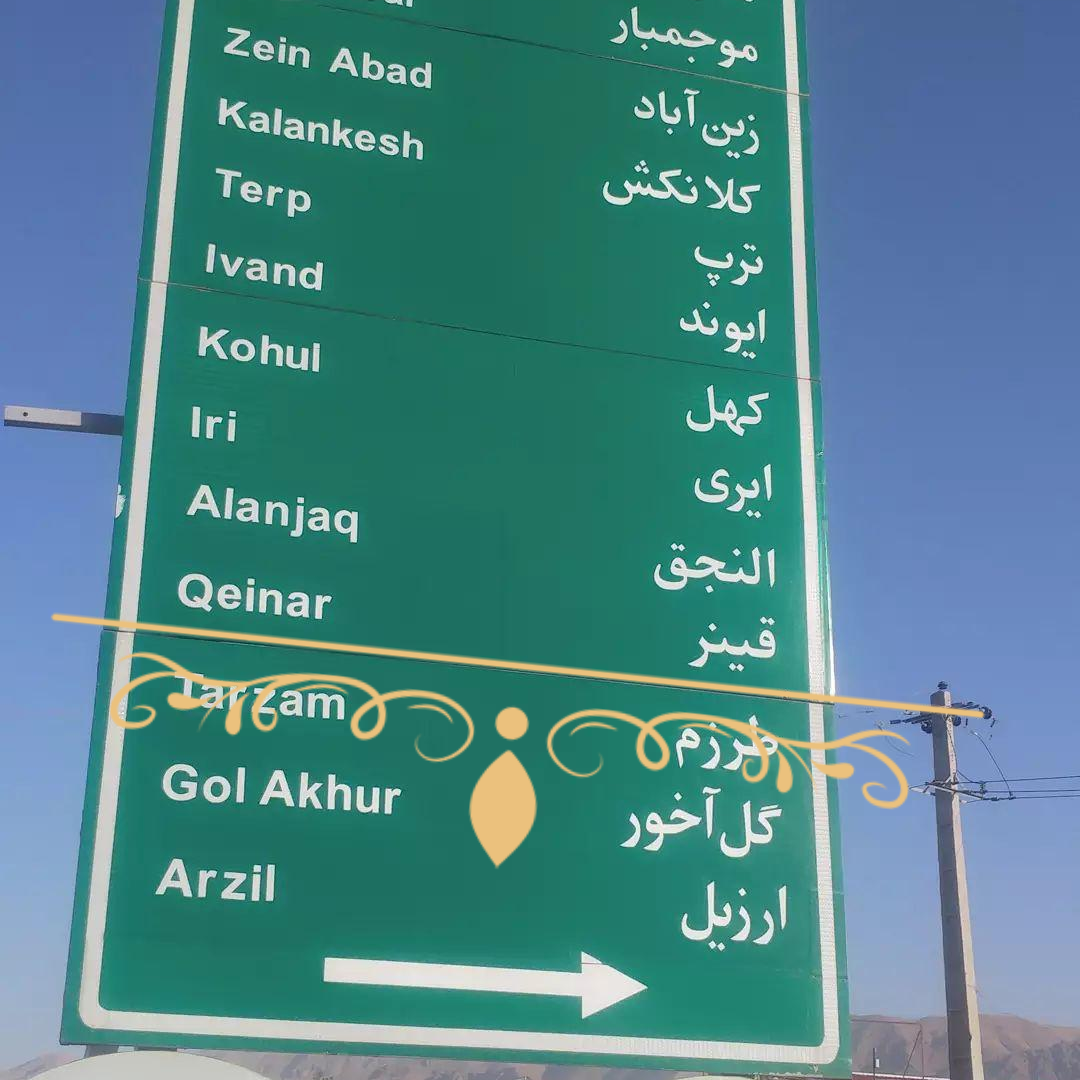
Qeinar

Qeinar (Persian: قينر; also known as Kenyār, Keynar, Kinār, and Qeinar kandi) is a village in Bonab Rural District, in the Central District of Marand County, East Azerbaijan Province, Iran. At the 2006 census, its population was 435, in 101 families.
