= Sivan, Marand =

Village in East Azerbaijan province, Iran

Sivan Persian: سيوان
- Village
- Location within Iran
- Coordinates: 38°19′26″N 45°52′15″E
- Country: Iran
- Province: East Azerbaijan
- County: Marand
- District: Central
- Rural District: Mishab-e Shomali

Population (2016)
  - Total: 212
- Time zone: UTC+3:30 (IRST)

Sivan (Persian: سيوان) (Note: Also romanized as Seyvan and Sīvān; formerly known as Sagban (سگبان), also romanized as Sagbān) is a village in Mishab-e Shomali Rural District of the Central District in Marand County, East Azerbaijan province, Iran.

== Demographics ==
=== Population ===
At the time of the 2006 National Census, the village's population was 331 in 104 households. The following census in 2011 counted 251 people in 81 households. The 2016 census measured the population of the village as 212 people in 80 households.
