= Qarajeh-ye Feyzollah =

Village in East Azerbaijan province, Iran

Qarajeh-ye Feyzollah Persian: قراجه فيض اله
- Village
- Location within Iran
- Coordinates: 38°28′35″N 45°31′45″E
- Country: Iran
- Province: East Azerbaijan
- County: Marand
- District: Koshksaray
- Rural District: Koshksaray

Population (2016)
  - Total: 1,842
- Time zone: UTC+3:30 (IRST)

Qarajeh-ye Feyzollah (Persian: قراجه فيض اله) (Note: Also romanized as Qarājeh Feyẕollāh, Qarajeh-ye Feyzollāh, and Qarājeh-ye Feyẕollāh; also known as Farājeh-ye Bālā, Gharajeh Fizelah, Nizhnyaya Karadzha, Qarājeh Bālā, Qarājeh Faẕlollāh, Qarājeh-ye Fazlollāh, and Qarājeh-ye Faẕlollāh) is a village in Koshksaray Rural District of Koshksaray District in Marand County, East Azerbaijan province, Iran.

== Demographics ==
=== Population ===
At the time of the 2006 National Census, the village's population was 1,851 in 449 households, when it was in the Central District. The following census in 2011 counted 1,837 people in 540 households. The 2016 census measured the population of the village as 1,842 people in 602 households.

In 2020, the rural district was separated from the district in the formation of Koshksaray District.
