= Jandala =

Jandala may refer to one of several places and polity in Pakistan :

- Jandala, Abbottabad, a town in Abbottabad district
- Jandala, Poonch, a village in Poonch district
- Jandala (Samahni Valley), a village in the Bhimber district
