= Shur Daraq, Marand =

Village in East Azerbaijan province, Iran

Shur Daraq Persian: شوردرق
- Village
- Location within Iran
- Coordinates: 38°21′02″N 45°53′29″E
- Country: Iran
- Province: East Azerbaijan
- County: Marand
- District: Central
- Rural District: Mishab-e Shomali

Population (2016)
  - Total: 1,021
- Time zone: UTC+3:30 (IRST)

Shur Daraq (Persian: شوردرق) (Note: Also romanized as Shūr Daraq; also known as Sho Deraicht, Shoordaragh, Shordara, Shordere, and Shūr Darreh) is a village in Mishab-e Shomali Rural District of the Central District in Marand County, East Azerbaijan province, Iran.

== Demographics ==
=== Population ===
At the time of the 2006 National Census, the village's population was 1,229 in 319 households. The following census in 2011 counted 1,069 people in 309 households. The 2016 census measured the population of the village as 1,021 people in 324 households.
