= Zanjireh =

Zanjireh or Zanjirah (Persian: زنجيره) may refer to:

- Zanjireh, East Azerbaijan
- Zanjireh, alternate name of Qarkhelar, East Azerbaijan Province
- Zanjireh-ye Olya, Ilam Province
- Zanjireh-ye Sofla, Ilam Province
- Zanjireh, West Azerbaijan
