= Sen Sarud Castle =

Castle in East Azerbaijan Province, Iran

- قلعه سن سارود

General information
- Type: Castle
- Location: Marand County, Iran

Sen Sarud Castle (Persian: قلعه سن سارود) is a historical castle located in Marand County in East Azerbaijan Province. It dates to the 13th or 14th century CE (7th or 8th century AH).
