= MIAB =

MIAB may refer to:

- Magnetically Impelled Arc Butt, a type of welding process
- Member of the International Association of Book-keepers
- Message in a bottle, a form of communication whereby a message is sealed in a container and released into a body of water
- mind.in.a.box, an Austrian electronic music band
- Music Industry Association of Belize, an organization formed by Ivan Duran
- Magnesium-ion aqueous battery, a magnesium-ion battery with water-based electrolyte

== See also ==
- Meyab
- Miab, East Azerbaijan
