= Harzand-e Atiq =

Village in East Azerbaijan province, Iran

Harzand-e Atiq Persian: هرزندعتيق
- Village
- Location within Iran
- Coordinates: 38°42′17″N 45°42′04″E
- Country: Iran
- Province: East Azerbaijan
- County: Marand
- District: Central
- Rural District: Harzandat-e Sharqi

Population (2016)
  - Total: 625
- Time zone: UTC+3:30 (IRST)

Harzand-e Atiq (Persian: هرزندعتيق) (Note: Also romanized as Harzand ‘Atīq and Harzand-e ‘Atīq; also known as Harzān, Harzand, and Harzand Atigh) is a village in Harzandat-e Sharqi Rural District of the Central District in Marand County, East Azerbaijan province, Iran.

== Demographics ==
=== Population ===
At the time of the 2006 National Census, the village's population was 603 in 163 households. The following census in 2011 counted 613 people in 167 households. The 2016 census measured the population of the village as 625 people in 190 households.
