= Chercher, East Azerbaijan =

Village in East Azerbaijan province, Iran

Chercher Persian: چرچر
- Village
- Location within Iran
- Coordinates: 38°33′42″N 45°43′23″E
- Country: Iran
- Province: East Azerbaijan
- County: Marand
- District: Central
- Rural District: Zonuzaq

Population (2016)
  - Total: 222
- Time zone: UTC+3:30 (IRST)

Chercher (Persian: چرچر) (Note: Also romanized as Char Char; also known as Cherchir and Chirchir) is a village in Zonuzaq Rural District of the Central District in Marand County, East Azerbaijan province, Iran.

== Demographics ==
=== Population ===
At the time of the 2006 National Census, the village's population was 285 in 77 households. The following census in 2011 counted 239 people in 77 households. The 2016 census measured the population of the village as 222 people in 69 households.
