= Sohlan, Abbottabad =

Sohlan
- Location within Pakistan
- Coordinates: 34°6′25″N 73°8′0″E
- Country: Pakistan
- Province: Khyber-Pakhtunkhwa
- Elevation: 1,178 m (3,865 ft)
- Time zone: UTC+5 (PST)

Sohlan is a village of Abbottabad District in Khyber-Pakhtunkhwa province of Pakistan. It is located at 34°6'25N 73°8'0E with an altitude of 1,178 metres (3,865 ft). Neighbouring settlements include Dhoba, Baghati and Chhar.
