= Abarghan, Marand =

Village in East Azerbaijan province, Iran

Abarghan Persian: ابرغان
- Village
- Location within Iran
- Coordinates: 38°27′42″N 45°53′12″E
- Country: Iran
- Province: East Azerbaijan
- County: Marand
- District: Central
- Rural District: Dowlatabad

Population (2016)
  - Total: 2,022
- Time zone: UTC+3:30 (IRST)

Abarghan (Persian: ابرغان) (Note: Also romanized as Abarghān, Āberghān, and Abraghan; also known as Āvargān, Avarkān, Āvergān, Avergian, and Avergyan) is a village in Dowlatabad Rural District of the Central District in Marand County, East Azerbaijan province, Iran.

== Demographics ==
=== Population ===
At the time of the 2006 National Census, the village's population was 2,184 in 505 households. The following census in 2011 counted 2,166 people in 615 households. The 2016 census measured the population of the village as 2,022 people in 600 households.
