= Daraq, East Azerbaijan =

Daraq درق
- Village
- Location within Iran
- Coordinates: 38°35′56″N 45°51′09″E
- Country: Iran
- Province: East Azerbaijan
- County: Marand
- Bakhsh: Central
- Rural District: Zonuzaq

Population (2006)
  - Total: 359
- Time zone: UTC+3:30 (IRST)
  - Summer (DST): UTC+4:30 (IRDT)

Daraq (Persian: درق; also known as Dara, Daragh, and Darah) is a village in Zonuzaq Rural District, in the Central District of Marand County, East Azerbaijan Province, Iran. At the 2006 census, its population was 359, in 90 families.
