= Biba (disambiguation) =

Biba was an iconic London fashion store of the 1960s and 1970s.

Biba or BIBA may also refer to:

== Places ==
- Biba, Egypt, a city
- Biba Dhaka, a village in Pakistan
- Bakki Airport, Iceland (ICAO code)

== People ==
=== Given name ===
- Biba Caggiano, Italian-American author, television chef and restaurateur
- Biba Golic (born 1977), Serbian table tennis player
- Biba Sakurai (born 1989), Japanese short track speed skater

=== Surname ===
- Andriy Biba (born 1937), Soviet football player and Ukrainian coach
- Bardhok Biba (1920–1949), Albanian communist politician
- Narinder Biba (1941–1991), Indian Punjabi singer

=== Nickname ===
- Boris Nayfeld (born 1947), Belarusian/Russian mob boss and heroin trafficker

== Other uses ==
- Biba Model, a formal state transition system of computer security policy
- Beijing International Bilingual Academy, a school in China
- "Biba", a 2019 song by Marshmello, Pritam and Shirley Setia; see Marshmello discography
- British Insurance Brokers' Association, representative of insurance brokers in the UK
- Brought in by ambulance
- Biba (restaurant)
