= Didehban, East Azerbaijan =

Village in East Azerbaijan province, Iran

Didehban Persian: ديده بان
- Village
- Location within Iran
- Coordinates: 38°23′16″N 45°47′53″E
- Country: Iran
- Province: East Azerbaijan
- County: Marand
- District: Central
- Rural District: Mishab-e Shomali

Population (2016)
  - Total: 746
- Time zone: UTC+3:30 (IRST)

Didehban (Persian: ديده بان) (Note: Also romanized as Dīdeh Bān and Dīdehbān) is a village in Mishab-e Shomali Rural District of the Central District in Marand County, East Azerbaijan province, Iran.

== Demographics ==
=== Population ===
At the time of the 2006 National Census, the village's population was 677 in 157 households. The following census in 2011 counted 706 people in 196 households. The 2016 census measured the population of the village as 746 people in 229 households.
