= Avargan =

Avargan or Owregan or Avergan or Urgan (Persian: اورگان) may refer to:

- Avargan, Chaharmahal and Bakhtiari
- Avargan, East Azerbaijan
- Owregan, Isfahan
