= Hafiz Ahangarpoor =

Abdul Hafiz Ahangarpoor
- حفیظ آهنگرپور
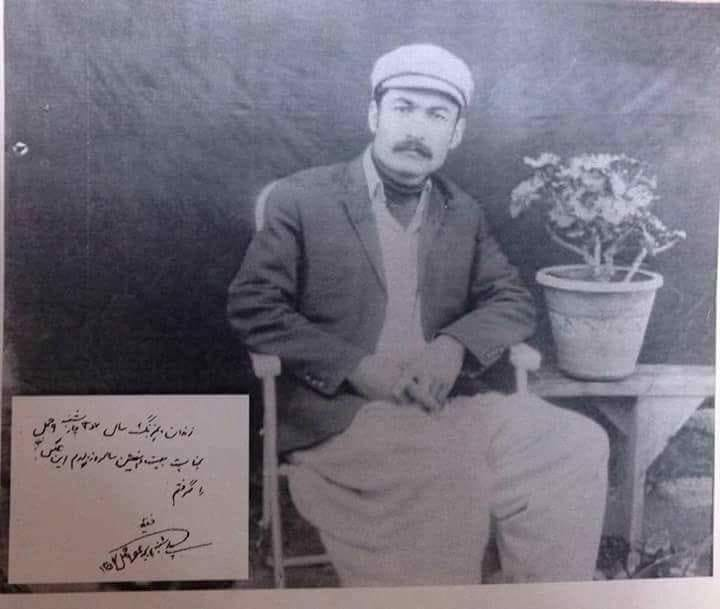
- Born: Abdul Hafiz; 1952; Baba Ali, Abshar District, Panjshir Province, Afghanistan
- Died: 1970s Afghanistan
- Citizenship: Afghanistan
- Education: Kabul Military High School
- Occupations: Political activist, revolutionary
- Years active: 1970s
- Known for: Activities in leftist movements and opposition to the governments of Afghanistan
- Political party: Liberation Organization of the People of Afghanistan (SAMA)
- Movement: Afghan leftist movements
- Relatives: Basir Badrooz (brother)

Hafiz Ahangarpoor (born 1952 in Baba Ali, Abshar District, Panjshir Province) was a Hazara political activist and revolutionary who was active in leftist movements in Afghanistan during the 1970s.

He grew up in a poor and working-class family. His father worked as a blacksmith, and for this reason the nickname "Ahangarpoor" (meaning "son of a blacksmith") became associated with him.

The difficult conditions of his family life and his early experiences working in a blacksmithing environment familiarized him with the problems of the working class, which played an important role in shaping his political and revolutionary views.

== Life ==
=== Education ===
Ahangarpoor completed his primary education in the village of Baba Ali and later entered the Kabul Military High School. During his student years he developed an interest in political and social debates and became acquainted with a number of intellectuals and political activists.

After finishing his studies, he gradually became involved in clandestine political activities and was influenced by the ideas of Afghan leftist intellectuals. During this period he established connections with various political activists, including circles associated with Taher Badakhshi.

=== Imprisonment during the rule of Mohammad Daoud ===
During the government of Mohammad Daoud Khan, many political opponents of the regime were arrested. Hafiz Ahangarpoor was also detained along with several of his associates and spent a period of imprisonment in Deh Mazang Prison in Kabul.

While in prison, he engaged in ideological and political discussions with other political prisoners and played a role in the formation of certain political circles among inmates.

=== Activities in leftist movements ===
After his release from prison, Ahangarpoor continued his political activities and became one of the active figures of the leftist movement in Panjshir Province. He organized a circle of political activists in the region.

In the late 1970s, his political circle cooperated with and later joined the Liberation Organization of the People of Afghanistan (SAMA), which was led by Abdul Majid Kalakani. This organization was one of the leftist groups opposing the Soviet Union and the government of the People's Democratic Party of Afghanistan.

== Death ==
Following political upheavals and the repression of opponents by the government of the People's Democratic Party of Afghanistan, Ahangarpoor was arrested and later killed along with a number of other political activists. He is considered one of the early victims of the political purges of that period.

=== Historical legacy ===
In some political writings and memoirs of leftist activists in Afghanistan, Hafiz Ahangarpoor is described as one of the organizers and militant figures of the leftist movement in Panjshir Province. Among political groups opposing the governments of that time, he was known as a revolutionary activist.

== See also ==
- Basir Badrooz
- Hazara people of Panjshir
- Abshar District
