= Harzand-e Jadid =

Village in East Azerbaijan province, Iran

Harzand-e Jadid Persian: هرزند جديد
- Village
- Location within Iran
- Coordinates: 38°39′25″N 45°45′20″E
- Country: Iran
- Province: East Azerbaijan
- County: Marand
- District: Central
- Rural District: Harzandat-e Sharqi

Population (2016)
  - Total: 841
- Time zone: UTC+3:30 (IRST)

Harzand-e Jadid (Persian: هرزند جديد) (Note: Also romanized as Harzand-e Jadīd; also known as Chairazan, Chāy Razān, and Chāy-e Harzand) is a village in, and the capital of, Harzandat-e Sharqi Rural District in the Central District of Marand County, East Azerbaijan province, Iran.

== Demographics ==
=== Population ===
At the time of the 2006 National Census, the village's population was 1,051 in 337 households. The following census in 2011 counted 966 people in 344 households. The 2016 census measured the population of the village as 841 people in 313 households. It was the most populous village in its rural district.
