= Daragh =

Daragh may refer to:

- Dair, an Ogham letter
- A spelling of the name Darragh
- Daragh, Iran, a village
