= Kinar =

Kinar may refer to:

- Kinnara, mythological creatures in Indian religions
  - Kinnara kingdom, associated with them in Indian mythology
- Kinar (film), a 2018 Indian Malayalam-language film, also released in Tamil as Keni
- Kinar, East Azerbaijan or Qeynar, a village in Iran
- Kinar, Markazi or Ghinar, a village in Iran
