= Chercher =

Chercher may refer to:

- Chercher (province), Ethiopia
- Chercher, East Azerbaijan village in Zonuzaq Rural District
- "Chercher" (song), Japanese song by Kotoko
