= Babereh-ye Sofla =

Village in East Azerbaijan province, Iran

Babereh-ye Sofla Persian: بابره سفلي
- Village
- Location within Iran
- Coordinates: 38°40′27″N 45°43′59″E
- Country: Iran
- Province: East Azerbaijan
- County: Marand
- District: Central
- Rural District: Harzandat-e Sharqi

Population (2016)
  - Total: 347
- Time zone: UTC+3:30 (IRST)

Babereh-ye Sofla (Persian: بابره سفلي) (Note: Also romanized as Bābareh-ye Soflá; also known as Bābereh-ye Pā'īn and Bābertīn-e Soflá) is a village in Harzandat-e Sharqi Rural District of the Central District in Marand County, East Azerbaijan province, Iran.

== Demographics ==
=== Population ===
At the time of the 2006 National Census, the village's population was 505 in 136 households. The following census in 2011 counted 423 people in 136 households. The 2016 census measured the population of the village as 347 people in 115 households.
