= Alinja (disambiguation) =

Alinja may refer to:

- Alinja
- Alinja, Iran
- Alinja Arena
- Alinja Tower
