= Bonab Rural District =

Bonab Rural District (Persian: دهستان بناب) may refer to:

- Bonab Rural District (Marand County), East Azerbaijan province, Iran
- Bonab Rural District (Zanjan County), Zanjan province, Iran
