= Qarkhelar =

Qarkhelar قرخلار
- Village
- Location within Iran
- Coordinates: 38°29′43″N 45°25′46″E
- Country: Iran
- Province: East Azerbaijan
- County: Marand
- Bakhsh: Central
- Rural District: Koshksaray

Population (2006)
  - Total: 44
- Time zone: UTC+3:30 (IRST)
  - Summer (DST): UTC+4:30 (IRDT)

Qarkhelar (Persian: قرخلار, also Romanized as Qerkhlār and Qerekhlar; also known as Kirkhiar, Kyrkhlar, Kirkhlar, Qahveh Khāneh-ye Qerekhlār, Qerkhlār Zanjīreh, and Zanjīreh) is a village in Koshksaray Rural District, in the Central District of Marand County, East Azerbaijan Province, Iran. At the 2006 census, its population was 44, in 13 families.
