= Qerkhlar =

Qerkhlar or Qarkhlar or Qerekhlar (Persian: قرخلر) may refer to:

- Qerkhlar, East Azerbaijan
- Qerkhlar, Hamadan
- Qerekhlar, Kurdistan
