= Alanjeq =

Village in East Azerbaijan province, Iran

Alanjeq Persian: النجق
- Village
- Location within Iran
- Coordinates: 38°25′43″N 46°04′43″E
- Country: Iran
- Province: East Azerbaijan
- County: Marand
- District: Central
- Rural District: Bonab

Population (2016)
  - Total: 1,086
- Time zone: UTC+3:30 (IRST)

Alanjeq (Persian: النجق) (Note: Also romanized as Alanjaq; also known as Alanjeh, Alenjeh, Alindzha, Alinja, and ‘Alīnjeh) is a village in Bonab Rural District of the Central District in Marand County, East Azerbaijan province, Iran.

== Demographics ==
=== Population ===
At the time of the 2006 National Census, the village's population was 1,408 in 333 households. The following census in 2011 counted 1,226 people in 359 households. The 2016 census measured the population of the village as 1,086 people in 345 households.
