= Marhes, Boi =

Marhes is a small hamlet in Boi, Abbottabad, Pakistan. It is under the jurisdiction of the Union Council of Abbottabad. The settlement is part of the larger village of Rankot, and is situated in a mountainous area about 1200 m above sea level.

The village is situated on the Ayubia track, which is a scenic tourist route, and is located about 24 km from Muzaffarabad and 56 km from Abbottabad. It is popular with tourists from the Hazara region and from Kashmir, especially in summer, and features a road with notably tall pine trees.
