= Didehban =

Didehban or Dideh Ban (Persian: ديده بان) may refer to:

- Didehban, East Azerbaijan
- Didehban, Fars
