= Meyab =

Meyab or Miab or Miyab (Persian: مياب) may refer to:

- Miab, East Azerbaijan, a village in northwest Iran
- Meyab, Razavi Khorasan, a village in northeast Iran

== See also ==
- MIAB (disambiguation)
