= Benab-e Marand =

City in East Azerbaijan province, Iran

Benab-e Marand Persian: بناب مرند
- City
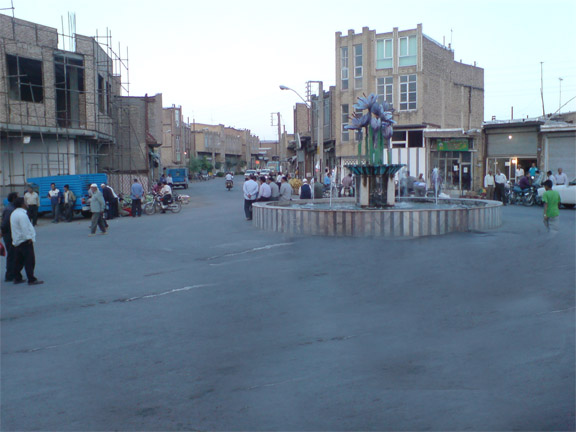
- City center

- Location within Iran
- Coordinates: 38°25′41″N 45°54′26″E
- Country: Iran
- Province: East Azerbaijan
- County: Marand
- District: Central
- Established as a city: 2004

Population (2016)
  - Total: 4,311
- Time zone: UTC+3:30 (IRST)

Benab-e Marand (Persian: بناب مرند) (Note: Also known as Banab, Benāb, Benāb Jadid, Binab, and Bonāb) is a city in the Central District of Marand County, East Azerbaijan province, Iran, serving as the administrative center for Bonab Rural District. The city is 72 kilometres (45 mi) from Tabriz and 12 kilometres (7.5 mi) from Marand. The village of Benab was converted to the city of Benab-e Jadid in 2004, and its name was changed to Benab-e Marand in 2012.

== Demographics ==
=== Population ===
At the time of the 2006 National Census, the city's population was 4,430 in 1,236 households. The following census in 2011 counted 4,371 people in 1,401 households. The 2016 census measured the population of the city as 4,311 people in 1,461 households.

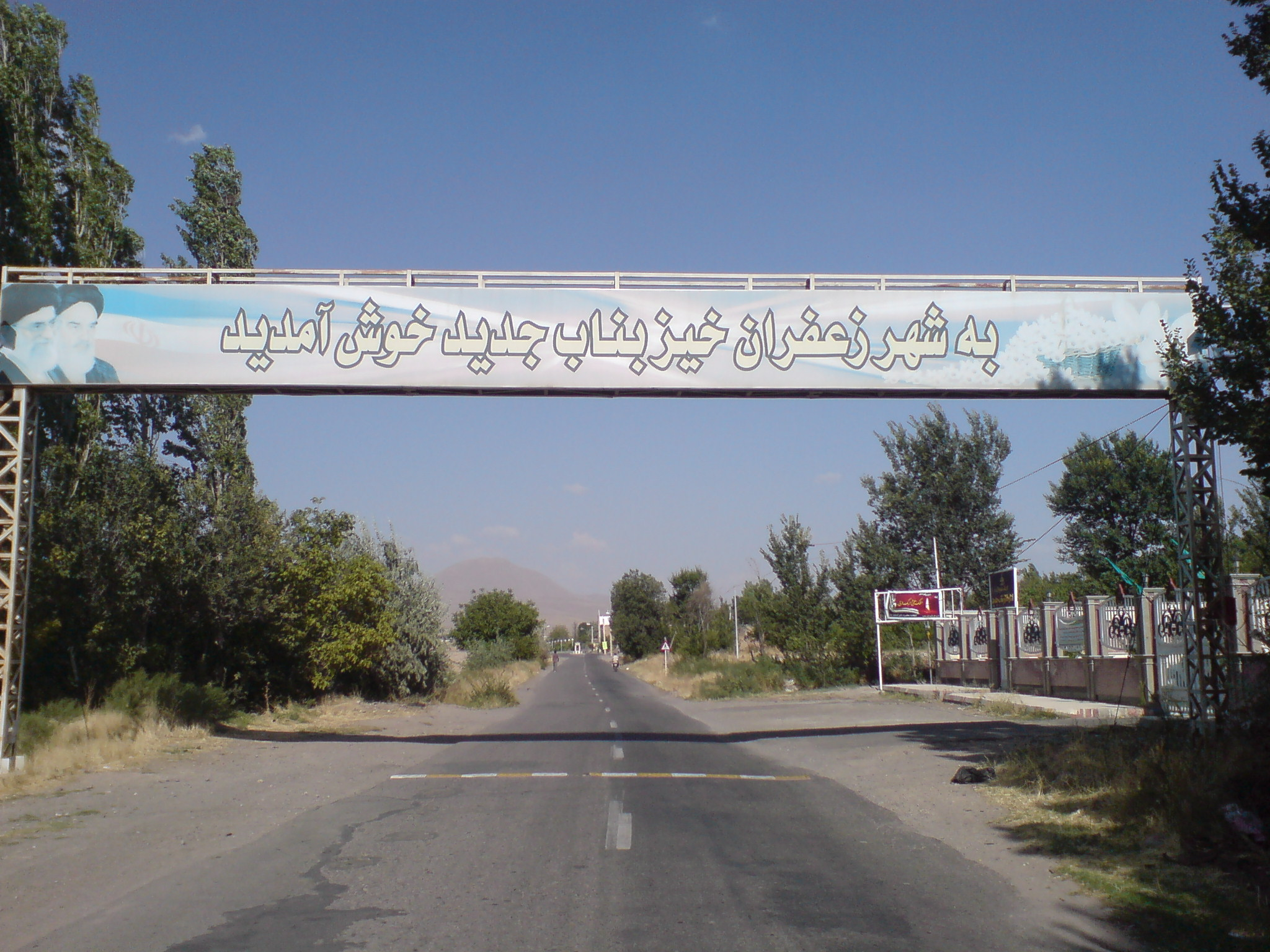
Benab marand-Western entrance road to the city
