= Biba Dhaka =

- Location within Pakistan
- Coordinates: 34.08°N 73.10°E
- Country: Pakistan
- Province: Khyber-Pakhtunkhwa
- Elevation: 1,502 m (4,928 ft)
- Time zone: UTC+5 (PST)

Biba Dhaka is a village in Khyber-Pakhtunkhwa. It is located at 34°8'25N 73°10'25E with an altitude of 1502 metres (4931 feet). Neighbouring settlements include Jabrian, Darah and Batangi.
