= Mishab-e Shomali Rural District =

Rural district in East Azerbaijan province, Iran

Mishab-e Shomali Rural District Persian: دهستان ميشاب شمالي
- Rural District
- Location within Iran
- Coordinates: 38°23′N 45°45′E
- Country: Iran
- Province: East Azerbaijan
- County: Marand
- District: Central
- Established: 1987
- Capital: Kondelaj

Population (2016)
  - Total: 14,214
- Time zone: UTC+3:30 (IRST)

Mishab-e Shomali Rural District (Persian: دهستان ميشاب شمالي) is in the Central District of Marand County, East Azerbaijan province, Iran. Its capital is the village of Kondelaj.

== Demographics ==
=== Population ===
At the time of the 2006 National Census, the rural district's population was 14,046 in 3,814 households. There were 13,938 inhabitants in 4,052 households at the following census of 2011. The 2016 census measured the population of the rural district as 14,214 in 4,346 households. The most populous of its 14 villages was Dizaj-e Olya, with 2,925 people.

=== Other villages in the rural district ===
- Anamoq
- Bahram
- Didehban
- Eyshabad
- Goljar
- Mahbubabad
- Molla Yusof
- Pir Bala
- Piyam
- Shur Daraq
- Sivan
