= Boi Union Council =

Union Council in Pakistan

Boi
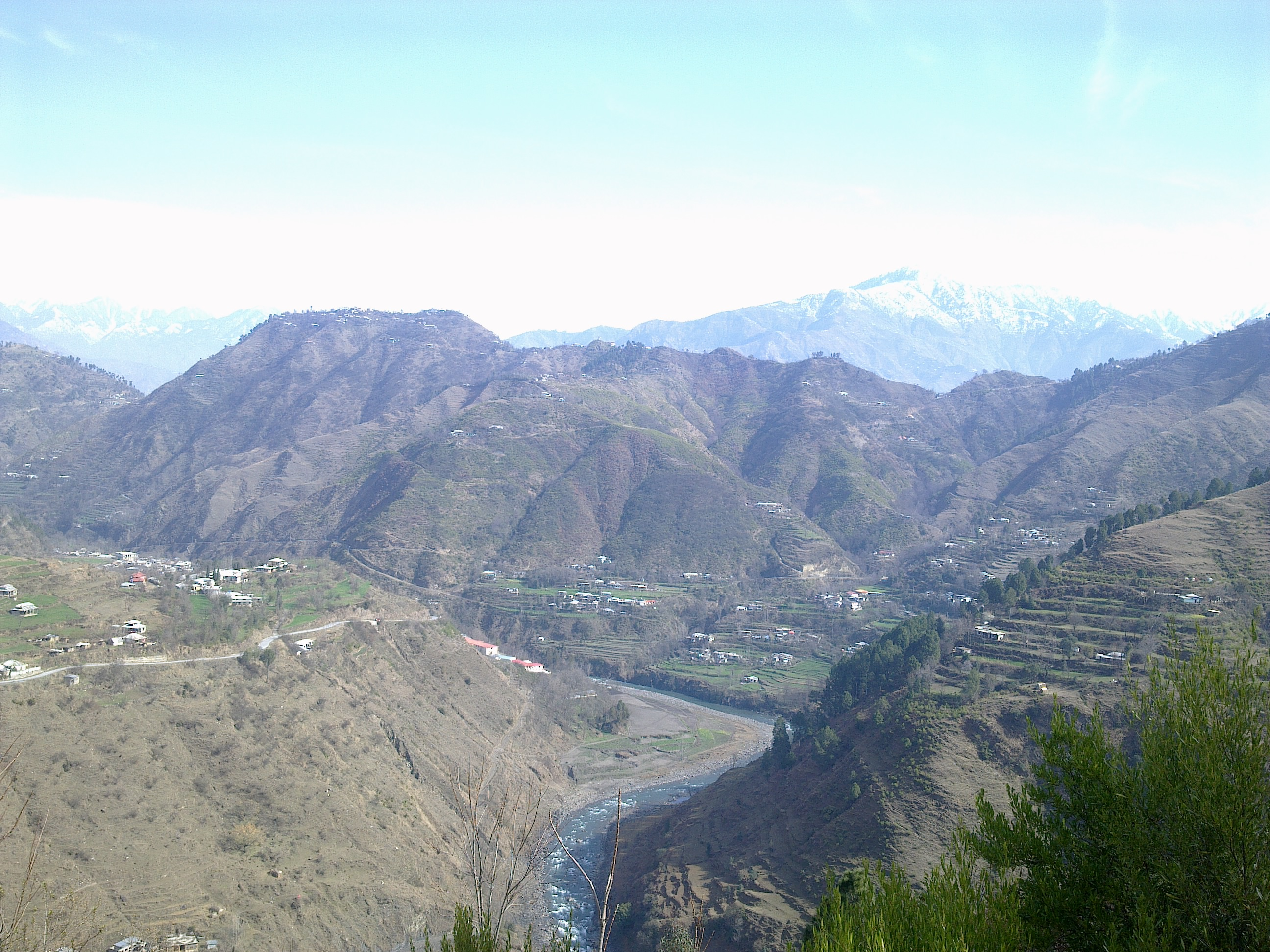
- View of river Kunhar between Meera Boi and Athyial Mzd taken from Thanda Nara.

- Location within Pakistan
- Coordinates: 34°18′10″N 73°26′20″E
- Country: Pakistan
- Province: Khyber Pakhtunkhwa
- District: Abbottabad
- Tehsil: Abbottabad
- Headquarters: Boi

Government
  - Member, National Assembly of Pakistan: Murtaza Javed Abbasi
  - Member of the Provincial Assembly: Nazeer Ahmed Abbasi

Population (2017 Census of Pakistan)
  - Total: 9,978
- Time zone: UTC+5 (PST)

Boi (Urdu: بوئی) is one of the 51 union councils of Abbottabad District in the Khyber Pakhtunkhwa province of Pakistan.

Boi is a Hindko word meaning "fragrance of roses", referring to rose flowerbeds found in the area.

== Location ==
The Union Council of Boi is located in the north west part of Abbottabad District and forms part of the district's eastern border with Kashmir (Muzaffarabad District).

== History ==
According to Captain Wace’s Report on the Land Revenue Settlement of the Hazara District (1868–1874), the Boi tract comprised 35 small hill villages, mostly located in the uplands above the Jhelum River. This area originally belonged to Sultan Hussain Khan, the Bamba Chief of Muzaffarabad. After being ousted from Muzaffarabad in 1847, Sultan Hussain Khan settled in the village of Boi, where he lived until his death in 1860. His successor, Sultan Barkat Khan, then assumed leadership.

The rights over the Boi tract were formalised based on the arrangements that were in effect at the time of settlement. Ownership of the villages was held by small agricultural communities, including Awans, Gujars, Sararas, Karrals, Dhunds, and other groups. However, certain estates and parcels of land remained under the direct control and management of the chief.

The chiefs continued to retain the tract as a jagir during the British era, with the obligation to pay one-fourth of the revenue as nazrana (tribute).

== Subdivisions ==
According to the 1998 census the Union Council of Boi had a population of 17,001, Boi Union Council is divided into the following areas:

Union Council Statistics – 2017 Census
Area	Total Population	Male	Female	Literacy Total	Male Lit %	Female Lit %
Bandi Saman	577	285	292	79.65	88.65	70.40
Bar Been	1,327	623	704	77.10	88.22	67.61
Batangi	278	152	126	83.33	100.00	65.09
Boi	845	411	434	61.55	71.38	52.68
Didal	2,050	937	1,113	65.84	79.19	55.60
Nakka	705	306	399	53.90	69.95	42.95
Pal	538	248	290	75.38	90.40	63.13
Ran Kot	2,986	1,323	1,663	64.93	85.61	48.70
Tori	643	321	322	90.49	98.41	82.30
