= Zonuz =

City in East Azerbaijan province, Iran

Zonuz Persian: زنوز
- City
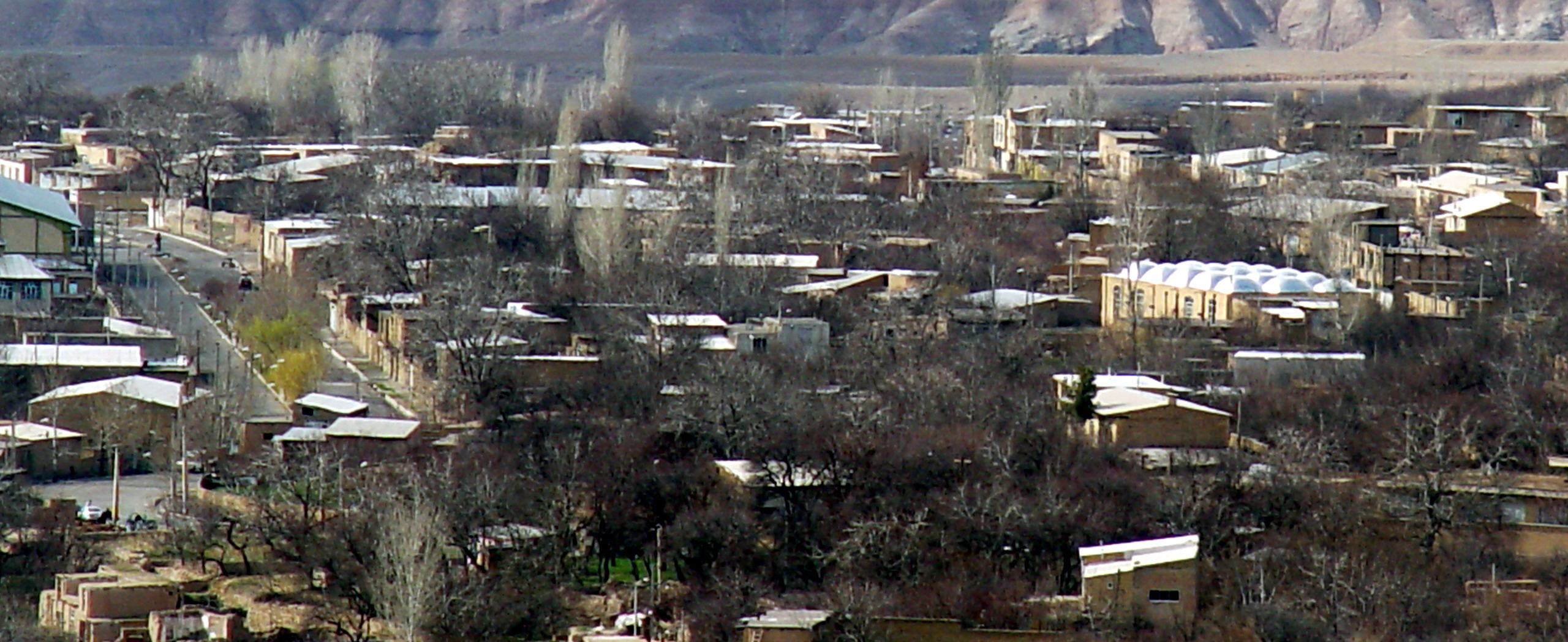

- Location within Iran
- Coordinates: 38°35′16″N 45°49′52″E
- Country: Iran
- Province: East Azerbaijan
- County: Marand
- District: Central
- Established: 3800 BC

Population (2016)
  - Total: 2,465
- Time zone: UTC+3:30 (IRST)

Zonuz (Persian: زنوز) (Note: Also known as Zunus; Azerbaijani: Zunuz) is a city in the Central District of Marand County, East Azerbaijan province, Iran.

== Demographics ==
=== Population ===
At the time of the 2006 National Census, the city's population was 2,618 in 826 households. The following census in 2011 counted 2,626 people in 802 households. The 2016 census measured the population of the city as 2,465 people in 843 households.

== See also ==
Media related to Zonuz at Wikimedia Commons
