= Miab, East Azerbaijan =

Village in East Azerbaijan province, Iran

Miab Persian: مياب
- Village
- Location within Iran
- Coordinates: 38°42′04″N 45°48′04″E
- Country: Iran
- Province: East Azerbaijan
- County: Marand
- District: Central
- Rural District: Harzandat-e Sharqi

Population (2016)
  - Total: 485
- Time zone: UTC+3:30 (IRST)

Miab (Persian: مياب) (Note: Also romanized as Meyāb, Mīāb, and Mīyāb) is a village in Harzandat-e Sharqi Rural District of the Central District in Marand County, East Azerbaijan province, Iran.

== Demographics ==
=== Population ===
At the time of the 2006 National Census, the village's population was 624 in 227 households. The following census in 2011 counted 611 people in 243 households. The 2016 census measured the population of the village as 485 people in 223 households.
