= Basir Badrooz =

Afghan social activist, poet, historian, and writer

- Born: 6 March 1956; Qubi (Baba Wali), Abshar District, Panjshir Province, Afghanistan
- Died: 15 November 2024 (aged 68)
- Citizenship: Afghanistan
- Occupations: Writer, poet, historian, social activist
- Relatives: Hafiz Ahangarpoor (brother)

Basir Badrooz (6 March 1956 – 14 November 2024) was a Hazara writer, poet, historian, and social activist. He was considered one of the cultural and intellectual figures of Afghanistan, particularly known for his literary activities, historical research, and political and social struggles.

== Biography ==
Basir Badrooz was born in the village of Qubi in Abshar District, Panjshir Province. He grew up in a family known for its involvement in political and social struggles. It is said that the environment of his family played an important role in shaping his political and social views.

The Badrooz family was well known among political activists in Afghanistan. His brother, Hafiz Ahangarpoor, was considered one of the prominent political fighters of Afghanistan in the late twentieth century and played an important role in political and social activities. This family background had a significant influence on Badrooz's intellectual and political path.

== Activities ==
During his lifetime, Basir Badrooz participated in various political and social activities. In the course of his struggle against injustice and authoritarianism, he experienced years of prison and torture. Despite these hardships, he did not abandon his intellectual and political activism and was widely regarded as a critical intellectual and advocate of freedom and justice.

In addition to political activities, Badrooz was also active in the fields of culture and literature. He possessed literary talent in both poetry and prose writing. His writings often addressed social issues, the history of Afghanistan, and his experiences in political struggles. He also had a strong interest in researching the social history of Afghanistan and documenting historical events.

== Works ==
Among his works was a book on the history of Ariana and Khorasan. Although the manuscript was completed, it was never published. He also wrote dozens of articles and research texts, many of which remained unpublished due to economic difficulties or censorship.

In writings and memorials published after his death, Badrooz has been described as a revolutionary, inquisitive thinker, and social activist. During his life he traveled to different regions of Afghanistan and sought to better understand the cultures and ethnic groups of the country to contribute to a deeper understanding of Afghan society.

== Death ==
In the later years of his life, Badrooz suffered from diabetes and eventually died on 15 November 2024 in the city of Pul-e Khumri.

Following his death, Latif Pedram, leader of the National Congress Party of Afghanistan, the National Council of Sunni Hazaras of Afghanistan, and several other intellectuals and political figures expressed condolences.

== Legacy ==
Badrooz is remembered as one of the lesser-known but influential cultural figures of Afghanistan. Some cultural media outlets described his death as marking the end of a period of intellectual struggle in Afghanistan.
