= Hazaras of Panjshir =

Panjshir Hazaras
Hazaras of Panjshir Province

Regions with significant populations
- Afghanistan (Abshar District and Parian District, Panjshir Province)

Languages
- Persian (local dialect)

Religion
- Islam (Sunni Hanafi)

Related ethnic groups
- other Hazaras, Tajiks, Ethnic groups in Afghanistan

Panjshir Hazaras are a group of the Hazara people who live in Panjshir Province of Afghanistan, mainly in Abshar District (Darah-ye Hazara, meaning "Hazara Valley") and Parian District.

== Geography and population ==
The largest concentration of Panjshir Hazaras is in Abshar District, which was previously known as Darah-ye Hazara ("Hazara Valley"). The population of this district is about 15,407 people, the majority of whom are Sunni Hazaras.

== Religion ==
The Hazaras of Panjshir Province are Sunni Muslims and are religiously aligned with the majority population of the province.

== Tribes ==
The tribes of the Panjshir Hazaras include Jahr Ali, Dawlat Ali, Baba Ali, Mehr Ali, Dost Ali, Sangi Khan, Gulab Khel, Mir Hazar, Qochqar, Atam, and Parachghani. They are mostly related to the Hazaras of Karam Ali, Sheikh Ali, Nikpai, Surkh and Parsa, and the Hazaras of Laghman and Khinjan, and are considered part of the larger Dai Kalan tribe.

== Cultural identity ==
The Panjshir Hazaras speak Persian with a local dialect and share physical, cultural, and ethnic characteristics with other Hazaras. At various times in history, some of them identified themselves as Tajiks in order to avoid ethnic or religious discrimination. However, in recent decades there have been efforts among them to reclaim and reaffirm their ethnic identity as Hazaras.

== Identity challenges ==
Despite being Sunni, this group has sometimes faced discrimination because of their Hazara facial features and ethnic background. As a result, in recent decades some of them have created identity-based organizations, including the National Council of Sunni Hazaras, in order to strengthen and revive their cultural and ethnic identity.

== Notable people ==
- Hafiz Ahangarpoor
- Basir Badrooz
