= Chhar =

- Location within Pakistan
- Coordinates: 34.07°N 73.09°E
- Country: Pakistan
- Province: Khyber-Pakhtunkhwa
- Elevation: 1,437 m (4,715 ft)
- Time zone: UTC+5 (PST)

Chhar is a village of Abbottabad District in Khyber-Pakhtunkhwa province of Pakistan. It is located at 34°7'0N 73°9'0E with an altitude of 1437 metres (4717 feet). Neighbouring settlements include Sohlan, Batangi and Kandar.
