= Rumah district =

Coordinates: 17°20′N 51°00′E

Rumah District مديرية رماه
- District
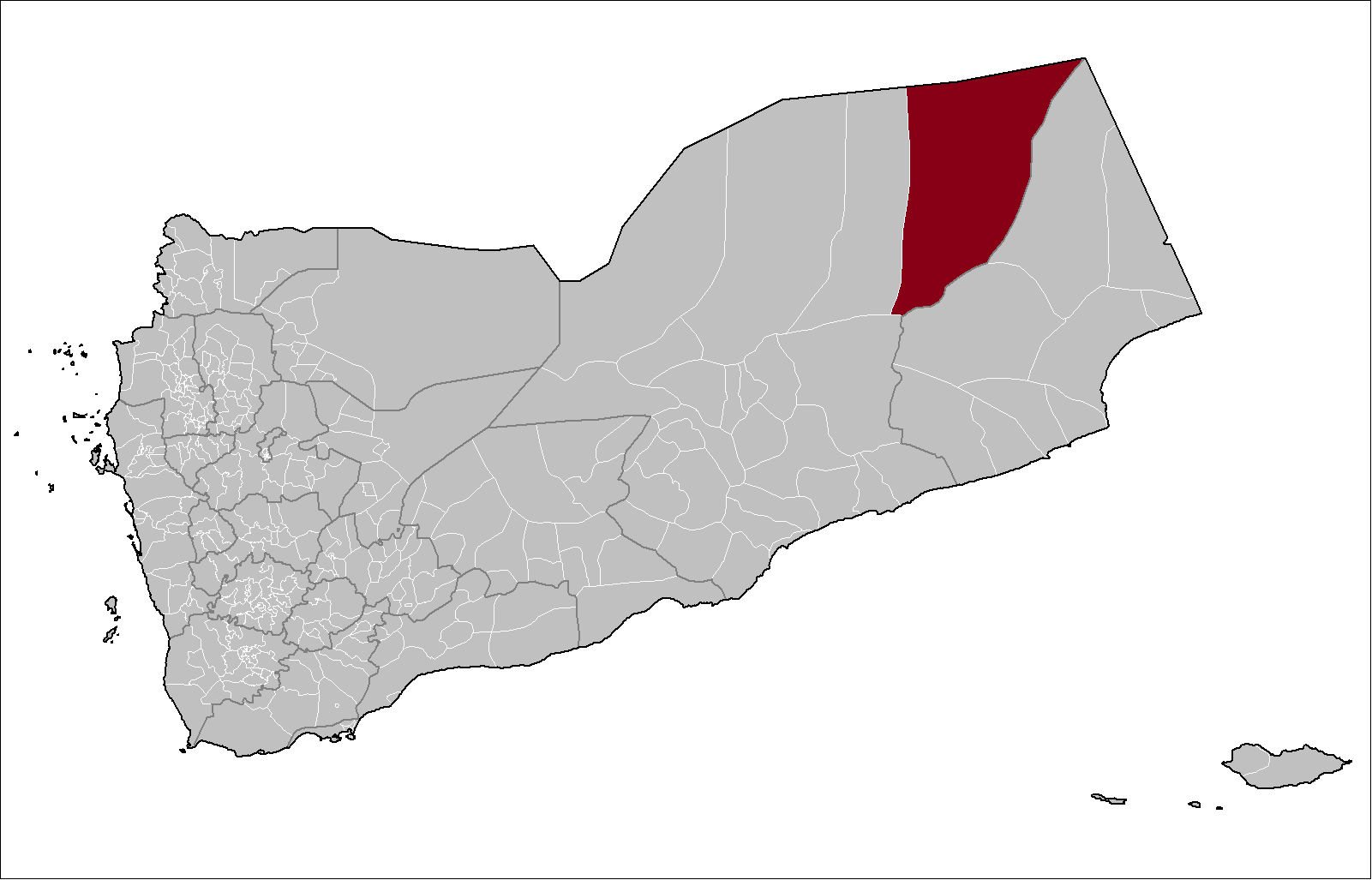
- The district highlighted in Yemen
- Country: Yemen
- Governorate: Hadhramaut Governorate

Population (2021)
  - Total: 10,080
- Time zone: UTC+3 (Yemen Standard Time)

Rumah District (Arabic: مديرية رماه) is a district of the Hadhramaut Governorate, Yemen. As of 2021, the district had a population of 10,080 inhabitants.
