= Koshksaray =

City in East Azerbaijan province, Iran

Koshksaray Persian: كشكسرائ
- City
- Location within Iran
- Coordinates: 38°27′42″N 45°33′59″E
- Country: Iran
- Province: East Azerbaijan
- County: Marand
- District: Koshksaray

Population (2016)
  - Total: 12,250
- Time zone: UTC+3:30 (IRST)

Koshksaray (Persian: كشكسرائ) (Note: Also romanized as Kashk Saray, Koshk Sarāy, and Koshksarāy; also known as Keshki-Sarai, Koghk Sarāy, Kūshg Sarāy, and Kūshk Sarāy; Turkish: Köşksaray) is a city in, and the capital of, Koshksaray District in Marand County, East Azerbaijan province, Iran. It was administrative center for Koshksaray Rural District until its capital was transferred to the village of Zanjireh.

== Demographics ==
=== Population ===
At the time of the 2006 National Census, the city's population was 7,439 in 1,858 households, when it was in the Central District. The following census in 2011 counted 7,723 people in 2,244 households. The 2016 census measured the population of the city as 12,250 people in 2980 households.

In 2020, Koshksaray Rural District and the city of Koshksaray were separated from the district in the formation of Koshksaray District.
