= Darah, Pakistan =

Darah
- Location within Pakistan
- Coordinates: 34.07°N 73.10°E
- Country: Pakistan
- Province: Khyber-Pakhtunkhwa
- Elevation: 1,217 m (3,993 ft)
- Time zone: UTC+5 (PST)

Darah is a village in Khyber-Pakhtunkhwa province of Pakistan. It is located at 34°7'40N 73°10'45E with an altitude of 1217 metres (3996 feet). Neighbouring settlements include Batangi, Biba Dhaka, and Tingur.
