= Jabrian =

- Location within Pakistan
- Coordinates: 34.32°N 73.02°E
- Country: Pakistan
- Province: Khyber Pakhtunkhwa
- Elevation: 1,724 m (5,656 ft)
- Time zone: UTC+5 (PST)

Jabrian is a village in the Khyber Pakhtunkhwa province of Pakistan. It is located at 34°32'20N 73°2'5E with an altitude of 1724 metres (5659 feet). Neighbouring settlements include Patian, Bakiran, and Fag Banda.
