= Dhoba =

Dobian
- Dobian Dam
- Coordinates: 34.06°N 73.07°E
- Country: Pakistan
- Province: Khyber Pakhtunkhwa NWFP

Government
- Elevation: 1,101 m (3,612 ft)

Population (2023)
  - Total: 1,100
  - Estimate: 1,100
- Time zone: UTC+5 (PST)

Dobian is a village of Abbottabad District in Khyber Pakhtunkhwa province of Pakistan. Dobian in local language means "du bayan or du bian", " دو بیان ", and in English it means "two contracts or agreements", which were signed between Malik Tribe of the village and armies desiring to use Dobian Pass for their caravans, and this is how it kept being used as a trade route for centuries. Malik Qazi Abdul Rahman has been the last descendant of the area. Dobian is located at 34°6'25N 73°7'20E with an altitude of 1101 meters and is famous for Dobian-Chamak Maira Dam (3615 feet).
