= Nowjeh Deh-ye Sofla =

Village in East Azerbaijan, Iran

Nowjeh Deh-ye Sofla نوجه ده سفلي
- Village
- Location within Iran
- Coordinates: 38°55′40″N 46°57′49″E
- Country: Iran
- Province: East Azerbaijan
- County: Kaleybar
- Bakhsh: Central
- Rural District: Misheh Pareh

Population (2006)
  - Total: 146
- Time zone: UTC+3:30 (IRST)
  - Summer (DST): UTC+4:30 (IRDT)

Nowjeh Deh-ye Sofla (Persian: نوجه ده سفلي, also Romanized as Nowjeh Deh-ye Soflá; also known as Nowjeh Deh-ye Shojā‘ān, Nowjeh Deh Shoja’eyan, Nowjeh Deh-ye Pā’īn, Nowjeh Deh-ye Shojā‘ī, Nowjeh Deh-ye Shojā‘īān, Nowjeh Deh-ye Sojā’ī, and Nūjeh Deh-e Shojā‘īān) is a village in Misheh Pareh Rural District, in the Central District of Kaleybar County, East Azerbaijan Province, Iran. At the 2006 census, its population was 146, in 43 families.
