= Batangi =

- Location within Pakistan
- Coordinates: 34.07°N 73.09°E
- Country: Pakistan
- Province: Khyber-Pakhtunkhwa
- Time zone: UTC+5 (PST)

Batangi is a village in Abbottabad District of Khyber-Pakhtunkhwa province of Pakistan. It is located at 34°7'42N 73°9'45E and is part of Boi Union Council Neighbouring settlements include Biba Dhaka, Darah and Chhar.

Batangi is a village near Lora. It is situated in the north of Lora after crossing the Haro Naddi. Mian Nawaz Sharif visited there during the heavy rains of 1993. Some relatives of Jabri villagers reside in Village Batangi.
