= Boi, Abbottabad =

Village in Pakistan

Boi
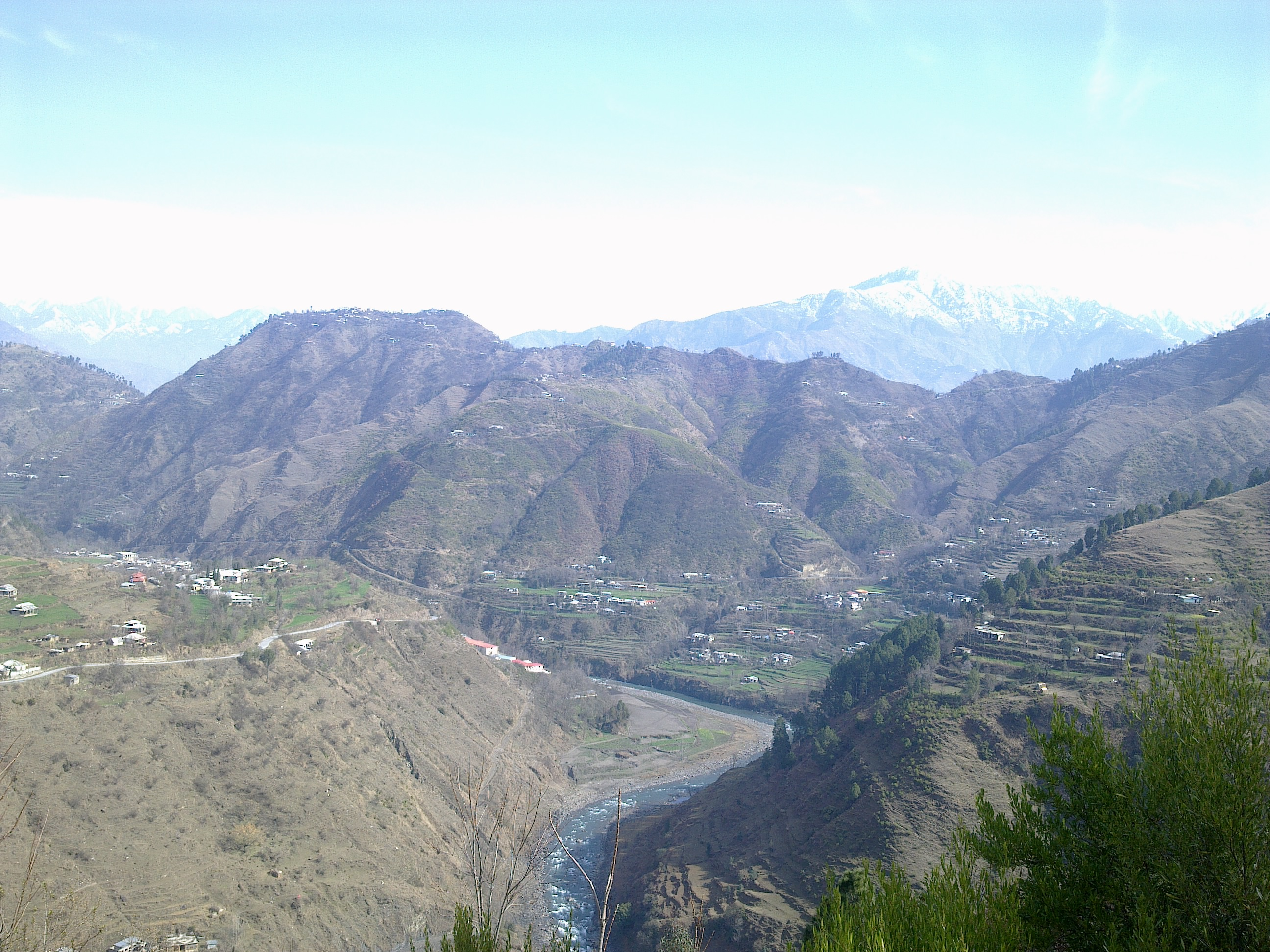
- View of river Kunhar between Meera Boi and Athyial Mzd taken from Thanda Nara.

- Location within Pakistan
- Coordinates: 34°18′10″N 73°26′20″E
- Country: Pakistan
- Province: Khyber Pakhtunkhwa
- District: Abbottabad
- Tehsil: Abbottabad
- Union Council: Boi

Government
  - Member, National Assembly of Pakistan: Murtaza Javed Abbasi
  - Member of the Provincial Assembly: Nazeer Ahmed Abbasi

Population (2017 Census of Pakistan)
  - Total: 845
- Time zone: UTC+5 (PST)

Boi (Urdu: بوئی) is a residential town and the chief settlement of Boi Union Council in the Abbottabad District of Khyber Pakhtunkhwa province, Pakistan.

Boi is a Hindko word meaning "fragrance of roses", referring to rose flowerbeds found in the area.

== Location ==
Boi is situated in the north west part of Abbottabad District and is located at 34°18'10N 73°26'20E and has an average elevation of 853 metres (2,799 ft).
