= Jandala, Rawalakot =

Village in Poonch district of Azad Kashmir

Coordinates: 33.96°N 73.65°E

Jandala is a village in the Rawalakot, Union Council Jandala, Tehsil of the Poonch District of Azad Kashmir. It is in the north east of the district, in the hills above the Jhelum Valley. The district was affected by the 2005 Kashmir earthquake, a major earthquake (7.6 on the Richter scale) in October 2005, and suffered from flooding in July 2006.

The main language spoken is Pahari. Schools are the government High School, Learners Leading Public School Jandala, the Nishter Public School Jandala and the Nishter inter college for girls and boys. Usually the population is served by the Arja Rural Health Center in Bagh. Main tribe of Jandala is Sudhan tribe while other clans are Mughals, Abbasi, Syed, Rajputs and Awan can also be found in the region.

In the evening, locals gather at a place called Baratian in Jandala to enjoy the sunset and the view. There is a museum in Jandala with old items that were used in Kashmiri culture but are rarely seen now.

The main areas of the village include:

- sadaat muhalla
- Kamroota
- Danna
- Pooth
- Hellan Jandala
- Nakkah Chapur Congola
- Timroota
- Sangaat
- Dabb
- Kayia Na Khaitar
- Lakhu Ne Hel
- Sahunta
- Lahasar
- Khaay
- Jehlary
- Kai Ne Hel
- Sai Ne Hel
- Mustana Nara Bazar
- Choki Muhallah
- Sehri Hel
- Salana Bar
- Mughal Muhallah
- Ziyarat Muhallah
- Olinger
- Kairr
- Dab
