= Qarajeh Malek =

Qarajeh Malek قراجه ملك
- Village
- Location within Iran
- Coordinates: 38°35′30″N 46°37′26″E
- Country: Iran
- Province: East Azerbaijan
- County: Varzaqan
- Bakhsh: Central
- Rural District: Ozomdel-e Jonubi

Population (2006)
  - Total: 75
- Time zone: UTC+3:30 (IRST)
  - Summer (DST): UTC+4:30 (IRDT)

Qarajeh Malek (Persian: قراجه ملك, also Romanized as Qarājeh Malek and Qarājeh Molk; also known as Gharajeh Malek, Karadzha, Karajamulik, and Qarājeh Malīk) is a village in Ozomdel-e Jonubi Rural District, in the Central District of Varzaqan County, East Azerbaijan Province, Iran. At the 2006 census, its population was 75, in 16 families.
