= Dowlatabad Rural District (Marand County) =

Rural district in East Azerbaijan province, Iran

Dowlatabad Rural District Persian: دهستان دولت آباد
- Rural District
- Location within Iran
- Coordinates: 38°29′N 45°51′E
- Country: Iran
- Province: East Azerbaijan
- County: Marand
- District: Central
- Established: 1987
- Capital: Dowlatabad

Population (2016)
  - Total: 12,170
- Time zone: UTC+3:30 (IRST)

Dowlatabad Rural District (Persian: دهستان دولت آباد) is in the Central District of Marand County, East Azerbaijan province, Iran. Its capital is the village of Dowlatabad.

== Demographics ==
=== Population ===
At the time of the 2006 National Census, the rural district's population was 13,022 in 3,230 households. There were 12,760 inhabitants in 3,684 households at the following census of 2011. The 2016 census measured the population of the rural district as 12,170 in 3,661 households. The most populous of its nine villages was Dowlatabad, with 3,868 people.

=== Other villages in the rural district ===
- Abarghan
- Bangin
- Hujqan
- Sari Tappeh
- Tazeh Kand-e Akhvond
