= Darah District =

Darah دره
- District
- Location within Afghanistan
- Coordinates: 35.2356°N 69.77°E
- Country: Afghanistan
- Province: Panjshir

Population (2019)
  - Total: 15,407
- Time zone: UTC+04:30 (AST)

Darah District (Dari: ولسوالی دره) is a district in Panjshir Province, Afghanistan. Its population was estimated at 15,407 in 2019

== See also ==
- Districts of Afghanistan
