= Zonuzaq Rural District =

Rural district in East Azerbaijan province, Iran

Zonuzaq Rural District Persian: دهستان زنوزق
- Rural District
- Location within Iran
- Coordinates: 38°36′N 45°53′E
- Country: Iran
- Province: East Azerbaijan
- County: Marand
- District: Central
- Established: 1987
- Capital: Zonuzaq

Population (2016)
  - Total: 2,075
- Time zone: UTC+3:30 (IRST)

Zonuzaq Rural District (Persian: دهستان زنوزق) is in the Central District of Marand County, East Azerbaijan province, Iran. Its capital is the village of Zonuzaq.

== Demographics ==
=== Population ===
At the time of the 2006 National Census, the rural district's population was 3,327 in 836 households. There were 2,717 inhabitants in 845 households at the following census of 2011. The 2016 census measured the population of the rural district as 2,075 in 687 households. The most populous of its seven villages was Zonuzaq, with 1,052 people.

=== Other villages in the rural district ===
- Chercher
- Kuh Kamar
