= Jandala, Abbottabad =

Jandala
- Location within Pakistan
- Coordinates: 34.01°N 73.16°E
- Country: Pakistan
- Province: Khyber-Pakhtunkhwa
- Elevation: 1,589 m (5,213 ft)
- Time zone: UTC+5 (PST)

Jandala is a village in Abbottabad District of Khyber-Pakhtunkhwa province of Pakistan. It is located at 34°1'10N 73°16'20E with an altitude of 1589 metres (5216 feet).
