= Bonab Rural District (Marand County) =

Rural district in East Azerbaijan province, Iran

Bonab Rural District Persian: دهستان بناب
- Rural District
- Location within Iran
- Coordinates: 38°28′N 46°00′E
- Country: Iran
- Province: East Azerbaijan
- County: Marand
- District: Central
- Established: 1987
- Capital: Benab-e Marand

Population (2016)
  - Total: 10,668
- Time zone: UTC+3:30 (IRST)

Bonab Rural District (Persian: دهستان بناب) is in the Central District of Marand County, East Azerbaijan province, Iran. It is administered from the city of Benab-e Marand.

== Demographics ==
=== Population ===
At the time of the 2006 National Census, the rural district's population was 9,038 in 2,252 households. There were 10,395 inhabitants in 2,931 households at the following census of 2011. The 2016 census measured the population of the rural district as 10,668 in 3,165 households. The most populous of its 10 villages was Ordaklu, with 5,985 people.

=== Other villages in the rural district ===
- Alanjeq
- Asdaghi
- Dugijan
- Javash
- Zarghan
