= Harzandat-e Gharbi Rural District =

Rural district in East Azerbaijan province, Iran

Harzandat-e Gharbi Rural District Persian: دهستان هرزندات غربي
- Rural District
- Location within Iran
- Coordinates: 38°40′N 45°35′E
- Country: Iran
- Province: East Azerbaijan
- County: Marand
- District: Central
- Established: 1987
- Capital: Galin Qiyeh

Population (2016)
  - Total: 5,094
- Time zone: UTC+3:30 (IRST)

Harzandat-e Gharbi Rural District (Persian: دهستان هرزندات غربي) is in the Central District of Marand County, East Azerbaijan province, Iran. Its capital is the village of Galin Qiyeh.

== Demographics ==
=== Population ===
At the time of the 2006 National Census, the rural district's population was 6,194 in 1,633 households. There were 5,652 inhabitants in 1,818 households at the following census of 2011. The 2016 census measured the population of the rural district as 5,094 in 1,759 households. The most populous of its 13 villages was Galin Qiyeh, with 1,990 people.

=== Other villages in the rural district ===
- Korrab
- Oryan Tappeh
- Zal
