= Harzandat-e Sharqi Rural District =

Rural district in East Azerbaijan province, Iran

Harzandat-e Sharqi Rural District Persian: دهستان هرزندات شرقي
- Rural District
- Location within Iran
- Coordinates: 38°41′N 45°49′E
- Country: Iran
- Province: East Azerbaijan
- County: Marand
- District: Central
- Established: 1987
- Capital: Harzand-e Jadid

Population (2016)
  - Total: 3,389
- Time zone: UTC+3:30 (IRST)

Harzandat-e Sharqi Rural District (Persian: دهستان هرزندات شرقي) is in the Central District of Marand County, East Azerbaijan province, Iran. Its capital is the village of Harzand-e Jadid.

== Demographics ==
=== Population ===
At the time of the 2006 National Census, the rural district's population was 4,527 in 1,329 households. There were 4,022 inhabitants in 1,338 households at the following census of 2011. The 2016 census measured the population of the rural district as 3,389 in 1,197 households. The most populous of its 12 villages was Harzand-e Jadid, with 841 people.

=== Other villages in the rural district ===
- Babereh-ye Sofla
- Harzand-e Atiq
- Miab
