= Abshar District =

Abshar آبشار
- District
- Location within Afghanistan
- Coordinates: 35.2512131°N 69.7767011°E
- Country: Afghanistan
- Province: Panjshir

Population
  - Total: 24,873
- Time zone: UTC+04:30 (AST)

Abshar District (Dari: ولسوالی آبشار) is one of the districts of Panjshir Province in the southeastern part of the province. It has a population of 24,873, with 25 villages and 4,781 families.

== See also ==
- Districts of Afghanistan
