= Koshksaray Rural District =

Rural district in East Azerbaijan province, Iran

Koshksaray Rural District Persian: دهستان کشکسرای
- Rural District
- Location within Iran
- Coordinates: 38°30′N 45°25′E
- Country: Iran
- Province: East Azerbaijan
- County: Marand
- District: Koshksaray
- Established: 1987
- Capital: Zanjireh

Population (2016)
  - Total: 23,822
- Time zone: UTC+3:30 (IRST)

Koshksaray Rural District (Persian: دهستان کشکسرای) is in Koshksaray District of Marand County, East Azerbaijan province, Iran. Its capital is the village of Zanjireh. The rural district was previously administered from the city of Koshksaray.

== Demographics ==
=== Population ===
At the time of the 2006 National Census, the rural district's population (as a part of the Central District) was 22,941 in 5,600 households. There were 23,173 inhabitants in 6,585 households at the following census of 2011. The 2016 census measured the population of the rural district as 23,822 in 7,128 households. The most populous of its 22 villages was Dizaj Hoseyn Beyg (now a city), with 4,060 people.

In 2020, the rural district was separated from the district in the formation of Koshksaray District.

=== Other villages in the rural district ===
- Aralan
- Ersi
- Gezafer
- Qarajeh-ye Feyzollah
- Qarajeh-ye Mohammad
- Qermezi Qeshlaq
- Vanlujaq
