= Koshksaray District =

District in East Azerbaijan province, Iran

Koshksaray District Persian: بخش کشکسرای
- District
- Location within Iran
- Coordinates: 38°30′N 45°28′E
- Country: Iran
- Province: East Azerbaijan
- County: Marand
- Established: 2020
- Capital: Koshksaray
- Time zone: UTC+3:30 (IRST)

Koshksaray District (Persian: بخش کشکسرای) is in Marand County, East Azerbaijan province, Iran. Its capital is the city of Koshksaray, whose population at the time of the 2016 National Census was 12,250 people in 2,980 households.

== History ==
In 2020, Koshksaray Rural District and the city of Koshksaray were separated from the Central District in the formation of Koshksaray District. The village of Dizaj Hoseyn Beyg was converted to a city in 2021.

== Demographics ==
=== Administrative divisions ===
Koshksaray District
Administrative Divisions
Koshksaray RD
Yalquz Aghaj RD
Dizaj Hoseyn Beyg (city) (Note: Became a city after the 2016 census)
Koshksaray (city)
RD = Rural District
