= Marand County =

County in East Azerbaijan province, Iran

Marand County Persian: شهرستان مرند
- County
- Location of Marand County in East Azerbaijan province (top left, pink)

- Location of East Azerbaijan province in Iran
- Coordinates: 38°35′N 45°43′E
- Country: Iran
- Province: East Azerbaijan
- Capital: Marand
- Districts: Central, Koshksaray, Yamchi

Population (2016)
  - Total: 244,971
- Time zone: UTC+3:30 (IRST)

Marand County (Persian: شهرستان مرند) is in East Azerbaijan province, Iran. Its capital is the city of Marand.

== History ==
In 2020, Koshksaray Rural District and the city of Koshksaray were separated from the Central District in the formation of Koshksaray District, including the new Yalquz Aghaj Rural District. The village of Dizaj Hoseyn Beyg was converted to a city in 2021.

== Demographics ==
=== Population ===
At the time of the 2006 National Census, the county's population was 229,215 in 59,097 households. The following census in 2011 counted 239,209 people in 69,471 households. The 2016 census measured the population of the county as 244,971 in 75,711 households. The vast majority are ethnic Azerbaijanis.

=== Administrative divisions ===
Marand County's population history and administrative structure over three consecutive censuses are shown in the following table.

Marand County Population
Administrative Divisions	2006	2011	2016
Central District	201,747	211,700	217,093
Bonab RD	9,038	10,395	10,668
Dowlatabad RD	13,022	12,760	12,170
Harzandat-e Gharbi RD	6,194	5,652	5,094
Harzandat-e Sharqi RD	4,527	4,022	3,389
Koshksaray RD	22,941	23,173	23,822
Mishab-e Shomali RD	14,046	13,938	14,214
Zonuzaq RD	3,327	2,717	2,075
Benab-e Marand (city)	4,430	4,371	4,311
Koshksaray (city)	7,439	7,723	8,060
Marand (city)	114,165	124,323	130,825
Zonuz (city)	2,618	2,626	2,465
Koshksaray District (Note: Established after the 2016 census)			
Koshksaray RD			
Yalquz Aghaj RD			
Dizaj Hoseyn Beyg (city) (Note: Became a city after the 2016 census)			
Koshksaray (city)			
Yamchi District	27,468	27,509	27,877
Yekanat RD	4,308	3,882	3,272
Zu ol Bin RD	13,840	13,795	14,213
Yamchi (city)	9,320	9,832	10,392
Total	229,215	239,209	244,971
RD = Rural District

== See also ==
Media related to Marand County at Wikimedia Commons
