= Central District (Marand County) =

District in East Azerbaijan province, Iran

Central District (Marand County) Persian: بخش مرکزی شهرستان مرند
- District
- Location within Iran
- Coordinates: 38°32′N 45°50′E
- Country: Iran
- Province: East Azerbaijan
- County: Marand
- Capital: Marand

Population (2016)
  - Total: 217,093
- Time zone: UTC+3:30 (IRST)

The Central District of Marand County (Persian: بخش مرکزی شهرستان مرند) is in East Azerbaijan province, Iran. Its capital is the city of Marand.

== History ==
In 2020, Koshksaray Rural District and the city of Koshksaray were separated from the district in the formation of Koshksaray District.

== Demographics ==
=== Population ===
At the time of the 2006 National Census, the district's population was 201,747 in 52,369 households. The following census in 2011 counted 211,700 people in 61,505 households. The 2016 census measured the population of the district as 217,093 inhabitants in 67,031 households.

=== Administrative divisions ===
Central District (Marand County) Population
Administrative Divisions	2006	2011	2016
Bonab RD	9,038	10,395	10,668
Dowlatabad RD	13,022	12,760	12,170
Harzandat-e Gharbi RD	6,194	5,652	5,094
Harzandat-e Sharqi RD	4,527	4,022	3,389
Koshksaray RD (Note: Transferred to Koshksaray District)	22,941	23,173	23,822
Mishab-e Shomali RD	14,046	13,938	14,214
Zonuzaq RD	3,327	2,717	2,075
Benab-e Marand (city)	4,430	4,371	4,311
Koshksaray (city)	7,439	7,723	8,060
Marand (city)	114,165	124,323	130,825
Zonuz (city)	2,618	2,626	2,465
Total	201,747	211,700	217,093
RD = Rural District
