= Yengejeh =

Yengejeh, Yangijeh, Yengeyeh, Yangjeh, Yengejah (Persian: ینگجه), also rendered as Engija, Yangidzha, or Yengidzha may refer to:

== Castles ==
- Yengejeh Castle

== Residential places ==
=== Ardabil Province ===
- Yengejeh, Meshgin Shahr, Ardabil Province
- Yengejeh, Namin, Ardabil Province
- Yengejeh-ye Molla Mohammad Hasan, Ardabil Province
- Yengejeh-ye Molla Mohammad Reza, Ardabil Province
- Yengejeh-ye Qeshlaq, Ardabil Province
- Yengejeh-ye Reza Beyglu, Ardabil Province
- Yengejeh-ye Reza Beyglu
- Yengejeh-ye Molla Mohammad Hasan

=== East Azerbaijan Province ===
- Yengejeh, Ajab Shir, East Azerbaijan Province
- Yengejeh, Azarshahr, East Azerbaijan Province
- Yengejeh, Abbas-e Gharbi, Bostanabad County, East Azerbaijan Province
- Yengejah, Ujan-e Sharqi, Bostanabad County, East Azerbaijan Province
- Yengejeh, Hashtrud, East Azerbaijan Province
- Yengejeh, Heris, East Azerbaijan Province
- Yengejeh, Maragheh, East Azerbaijan Province
- Yengejeh-ye Kord, Marand County, East Azerbaijan Province
- Yengejeh-ye Sadat, Marand County, East Azerbaijan Province
- Yengejeh-ye Yaranmish, Marand County, East Azerbaijan Province
- Yengejeh, Meyaneh, East Azerbaijan Province
- Yengejeh-ye Daliganlu, Meyaneh County, East Azerbaijan Province
- Yengejah, Sarab, East Azerbaijan Province
- Yengejeh-ye Khatun, Shabestar County, East Azerbaijan Province
- Yengejeh, Varzaqan, East Azerbaijan Province
- Yengejeh Rural District, in East Azerbaijan Province

=== Hamadan Province ===
- Yangijeh, Hamadan
- Yengejeh, Hamadan
- Yengejeh-ye Karafs, Hamadan Province

=== Kurdistan Province ===
- Yangijeh, Kurdistan, a village in Marivan County

=== Razavi Khorasan Province ===
- Yengejeh, Razavi Khorasan

=== West Azerbaijan Province ===
- Yengejeh, Bukan, a village in Bukan County
- Yengejeh, Miandoab, a village in Miandoab County
- Yengejeh, Salmas, a village in Salmas County
- Yengejeh, Shahin Dezh, a village in Shahin Dezh County
- Yengejeh, Nazlu, a village in Urmia County
- Yengejeh, Sumay-ye Beradust, a village in Urmia County
- Yengejeh-ye Qazi, a village in Urmia County

=== Zanjan Province ===
- Yengijeh, Zanjan
- Yengejeh, Khodabandeh, Zanjan Province
- Yengejeh, Mahneshan, Zanjan Province
- Yengejeh, Anguran, Mahneshan County, Zanjan Province
- Yengejeh-ye Reza Beyglu
- Yengejeh-ye Molla Mohammad Hasan

== See also ==
- Yengijeh (disambiguation)
- Yenkejeh (disambiguation)
