= Golzar =

Golzar or Gol Zar (Persian: گلزار) may refer to the following places:

== Afghanistan ==
- Golzar, Kabul, village in Kabul Province
- Golzar, Kandahar, village in Kandahar Province

== Iran ==
- Gol Zar, East Azerbaijan, a village in East Azerbaijan Province
- Golzar, East Azerbaijan, a village in East Azerbaijan Province
- Golzar, Hormozgan, a village in Hormozgan Province
- Golzar, alternate name of Goleh Jar, Ilam, a village in Ilam Province
- Golzar, alternate name of Harkabud-e Golzar, a village in Ilam Province
- Golzar, Kerman, a city in Kerman Province
- Golzar, Shushtar, a village in Khuzestan Province
- Golzar, Lorestan, a village in Lorestan Province
- Golzar, North Khorasan, a village in North Khorasan Province
- Golzar, Razavi Khorasan, a village in Razavi Khorasan Province
- Golzar, Tehran, a village in Tehran Province
- Golzar, Hirmand, a village in Sistan and Baluchestan Province
- Golzar Rural District, Kerman Province

== See also ==
- Golzar-e Haddad, a village in Ilam Province
- Golzar-e Mohammad, a village in Isfahan Province
- Golzar-e Olya, a village in Kurdistan Province
- Gulzar (disambiguation)
