= Gulzar (disambiguation) =

Gulzar is the pen name of Indian lyricist and filmmaker Sampooran Singh Kalra.

Gulzar may also refer to:

== People ==
- Gulzar Alam (born 1959), Pashto singer from Pakistan
- Gulzar Singh Cheema (born 1954), Indian-born Canadian politician
- Rakhee Gulzar (born 1947), Indian actress, former wife of Gulzar
- Gulzari Lal Nanda (1898–1998), Indian politician and economist, twice served as acting Prime Minister of India

== Places ==
=== Afghanistan ===
- Golzar, Kabul, a village also spelled Gulzar
- Golzar, Kandahar, a village also spelled Gulzar

=== Pakistan ===
- Gulzar, Kharan, a town
- Gulzar, Mardan, a village
- Gulzar, Quetta, a town
- Gulzar, Pakistan, a town
- Gulzar, Punjab, a town
- Gulzar Colony, a neighbourhood of Korangi Town in Karachi

=== Turkey ===
- Akdurmuş, Bingöl, a village also known as Gulzar

== See also ==
- Places in Pakistan:
  - Gulzar Kalle, a village in Bannu District
  - Gulzar Khanwala, a village in Dera Ghazi Khan District
  - Gulzar malik, a village in Gatti District Faisalabad, Punjab, Pakistan
  - Gulzar-e-Hijri, in Gulshan Town, Karachi
  - Gulzar Bhulkani, a town in Jacobabad District
- Golzar (disambiguation)
