= Yengijeh =

Yengijeh (Persian: ینگیجه) may refer to various places in Iran:

- Yengijeh, Azarshahr, East Azerbaijan Province
- Yengijeh, Maragheh, East Azerbaijan Province
- Yengijeh, Hamadan
- Yengijeh, Kermanshah
- Yengijeh, Kurdistan
- Yengijeh, Razavi Khorasan
- Yengijeh, West Azerbaijan
- Yengijeh, Shahin Dezh, West Azerbaijan Province
- Yangijeh, Urmia, West Azerbaijan Province
- Yengijeh, Zanjan
- Yengijeh, Mahneshan, Zanjan Province

== See also ==
- Yengejeh (disambiguation)
- Yenkejeh (disambiguation)
