= Yekan =

Yekan (Persian: يكان) may refer to:

- Yekan, Armenia
- Yekan-e Kahriz, Iran
- Yekan-e Olya, Iran
- Yekan-e Sadi, Iran

== See also ==
- Yakan (disambiguation)
