= Yenkejeh =

Yenkejeh (Persian: ينكجه) may refer to:

- Yenkejeh, West Azerbaijan
- Yenkejeh, Zanjan

== See also ==
- Yengijeh (disambiguation)
- Yengejeh (disambiguation)
