= Kuh Zar =

Kuh Zar (Persian: كوه زر) may refer to:

- Kuh Zar, Khuzestan
- Kuh Zar, Semnan
