= Qush Qayahsi =

Qush Qayahsi or Qush Qayehsi (Persian: قوش قيه سي) may refer to:

- Qush Qayahsi, Kaleybar
- Qush Qayehsi, Malekan
- Qush Qayehsi, Maragheh
- Qush Qayahsi, Marand
