= Aq Kahriz =

Aq Kahriz (Persian: اق كهريز) may refer to:

- Aq Kahriz, East Azerbaijan
- Aq Kahriz, Marand, East Azerbaijan Province
- Aq Kahriz, Hamadan
- Aq Kahriz, Markazi
- Aq Kahriz, Razavi Khorasan
- Aq Kahriz Rural District, in Markazi Province
