= Jagan =

Jagan may refer to:

== People with the name ==
- Jagan (actor) (born 1976), Indian film actor and comedian active in Tamil films
- Jagan Prasad Garg (born 1952), Indian politician
- Jagan Hames (born 1975), Australian athlete
- Jagan Kumar, Indian motorcycle racer
- Cheddi Jagan (1918–1997), Guyanese politician who served as Premier of British Guiana
- Derek Jagan (1930–2000), Guyanese politician and lawyer who served as Speaker of the National Assembly
- Janet Jagan (1920–2009), the first female President of Guyana
- Joey Jagan, Guyanese dentist and politician
- K. P. Jagan (born 1971), Indian Tamil film actor and director
- Suraj Jagan (born 1967), Indian playback singer of Malayali origin
- Y. S. Jagan Mohan Reddy (born 1972), Indian politician and 17th Chief Minister of Andhra Pradesh

== Other uses ==
- Jagan, Iran (disambiguation), several places in Iran
- Jagan (film), a 1984 Indian film

== See also ==
- Jagannath, a deity worshipped in regional traditions of Hinduism in India and Bangladesh.
- Jagannath (disambiguation)
- Ramjagan, Indian actor
- Jaghan (disambiguation)
- Yagan (disambiguation)
