= Asli Kandi =

Asli Kandi اصلي كندي
- Village
- Location within Iran
- Coordinates: 38°42′10″N 45°25′11″E
- Country: Iran
- Province: East Azerbaijan
- County: Marand
- Bakhsh: Yamchi
- Rural District: Yekanat

Population (2006)
  - Total: 103
- Time zone: UTC+3:30 (IRST)
  - Summer (DST): UTC+4:30 (IRDT)

Asli Kandi (Persian: اصلي كندي, also Romanized as Aşlī Kandī; also known as Aşlī Kand, Aşlī Kand-e Bālā, and Aşl Kand) is a village in Yekanat Rural District, Yamchi District, Marand County, East Azerbaijan Province, Iran. At the 2006 census, its population was 103, in 17 families.
