= Markid =

Markid (Persian: مركيد), also rendered as Margid or Markit, may refer to:

- Markid, Heris
- Markid, Marand
- Markid Kharabehsi, Marand County
