= Jagan, Iran =

Jagan (Persian: جگان) in Iran may refer to:

- Jagan, Jiroft, Kerman Province
- Jagan, Qaleh Ganj, Kerman Province
- Jagan, West Azerbaijan
- Jagan-e Kord, West Azerbaijan Province
