= Goleh Jar =

Goleh Jar or Golah Jar or Galah Jar or Golah Jar or Geleh Jar (Persian: گله جار) may refer to:

- Goleh Jar, Ilam
- Golah Jar, Kermanshah
