= Rumquyusi =

Rumquyusi روم قويوسي
- Village
- Location within Iran
- Coordinates: 38°35′16″N 45°33′26″E
- Country: Iran
- Province: East Azerbaijan
- County: Marand
- Bakhsh: Yamchi
- Rural District: Zolbin

Population (2006)
  - Total: 33
- Time zone: UTC+3:30 (IRST)
  - Summer (DST): UTC+4:30 (IRDT)

Rumquyusi (Persian: روم قويوسي, also Romanized as Rūm Qūyūsī; also known as Orūm Qūyūsī) is a village in Zolbin Rural District, Yamchi District, Marand County, East Azerbaijan Province, Iran. At the 2006 census, its population was 33, in 6 families.
