= Arbatan, Marand =

Village in East Azerbaijan province, Iran

Arbatan Persian: ارباتان
- Village
- Location within Iran
- Coordinates: 38°29′01″N 45°43′03″E
- Country: Iran
- Province: East Azerbaijan
- County: Marand
- District: Yamchi
- Rural District: Zu ol Bin

Population (2016)
  - Total: 1,563
- Time zone: UTC+3:30 (IRST)

Arbatan (Persian: ارباتان) (Note: Also romanized as Arbaţān) is a village in Zu ol Bin Rural District of Yamchi District in Marand County, East Azerbaijan province, Iran.

== Etymology ==
According to Vladimir Minorsky, the name "Arbatan" is derived from the Mongolian language and means "chief of ten men".

== Demographics ==
=== Population ===
At the time of the 2006 National Census, the village's population was 1,582 in 336 households. The following census in 2011 counted 1,468 people in 395 households. The 2016 census measured the population of the village as 1,563 people in 468 households.
