= Livar-e Pain =

Village in East Azerbaijan province, Iran

Livar-e Pain Persian: ليوار پايين
- Village
- Location within Iran
- Coordinates: 38°32′07″N 45°41′34″E
- Country: Iran
- Province: East Azerbaijan
- County: Marand
- District: Yamchi
- Rural District: Zu ol Bin

Population (2016)
  - Total: 895
- Time zone: UTC+3:30 (IRST)

Livar-e Pain (Persian: ليوار پايين) is a village in Zu ol Bin Rural District of Yamchi District in Marand County, East Azerbaijan province, Iran.

== Demographics ==
=== Population ===
The village did not appear in the National Census of 2006. The following census in 2011 counted 790 people in 249 households. The 2016 census measured the population of the village as 895 people in 282 households.
