= Livar =

Village in East Azerbaijan province, Iran

Livar Persian: ليوار
- Village
- Location within Iran
- Coordinates: 38°33′04″N 45°40′37″E
- Country: Iran
- Province: East Azerbaijan
- County: Marand
- District: Yamchi
- Rural District: Zu ol Bin

Population (2016)
  - Total: 1,178
- Time zone: UTC+3:30 (IRST)

Livar (Persian: ليوار) (Note: Also romanized as Līvār; also known as Līvār-e Bālā) is a village in Zu ol Bin Rural District of Yamchi District in Marand County, East Azerbaijan province, Iran.

== Demographics ==
=== Population ===
At the time of the 2006 National Census, the village's population was 2,187 in 558 households. The following census in 2011 counted 1,203 people in 393 households. The 2016 census measured the population of the village as 1,178 people in 403 households.
