= Agh Kahriz =

Agh Kahriz اغ كهريز
- Village
- Location within Iran
- Coordinates: 38°42′19″N 45°21′50″E
- Country: Iran
- Province: East Azerbaijan
- County: Marand
- Bakhsh: Yamchi
- Rural District: Yekanat

Population (2006)
  - Total: 13
- Time zone: UTC+3:30 (IRST)
  - Summer (DST): UTC+4:30 (IRDT)

Agh Kahriz (Persian: اغ كهريز, also Romanized as Āgh Kahrīz; also known as Āq Kahrīz) is a village in Yekanat Rural District, Yamchi District, Marand County, East Azerbaijan Province, Iran. At the 2006 census, its population was 13, in 7 families.
