= Markit (disambiguation) =

Markit Ltd. was a British financial information and services company.

Markit may also refer to:

- Markit, Iran (disambiguation)
- Markit Purchasing Managers' Index, an economic indicator derived from monthly surveys of private sector companies
- IHS Markit, an American-British information provider
- KM-MARKIT (born 1976), Japanese singer

== See also ==
- Market (disambiguation)
