= Gol Zar, East Azerbaijan =

Gol Zar گل زار
- Village
- Location within Iran
- Coordinates: 38°29′51″N 45°43′59″E
- Country: Iran
- Province: East Azerbaijan
- County: Marand
- Bakhsh: Yamchi
- Rural District: Zolbin

Population (2006)
  - Total: 155
- Time zone: UTC+3:30 (IRST)
  - Summer (DST): UTC+4:30 (IRDT)

Gol Zar (Persian: گل زار, also Romanized as Gol Zār and Golzār; also known as Gol ‘Az̄ār, Golīzār, Gol Mazār, Gol ‘oz̄ār, Golūzar, Gulezār, and Kyulyazar) is a village in Zolbin Rural District, Yamchi District, Marand County, East Azerbaijan Province, Iran. According to the 2006 census, its population was 155, in 38 families.
