= Galehban =

Village in East Azerbaijan province, Iran

Galehban Persian: گله بان
- Village
- Location within Iran
- Coordinates: 38°31′29″N 45°32′21″E
- Country: Iran
- Province: East Azerbaijan
- County: Marand
- District: Yamchi
- Rural District: Zu ol Bin

Population (2016)
  - Total: 3,070
- Time zone: UTC+3:30 (IRST)

Galehban (Persian: گله بان) (Note: Also romanized as Galehbān and Gallehbān; also known as Kalehbān, Kyāliāvan, and Kyalyavan) is a village in Zu ol Bin Rural District of Yamchi District in Marand County, East Azerbaijan province, Iran.

== Demographics ==
=== Population ===
At the time of the 2006 National Census, the village's population was 3,042 in 703 households. The following census in 2011 counted 3,058 people in 834 households. The 2016 census measured the population of the village as 3,070 people in 1,027 households.
