= Morkit =

Morkit may refer to:

- Anthraquinone, a pharmaceutical
- Morkit, Iran, a village
