= Farfar =

Village in East Azerbaijan province, Iran

Farfar Persian: فارفار
- Village
- Location within Iran
- Coordinates: 38°28′59″N 45°41′08″E
- Country: Iran
- Province: East Azerbaijan
- County: Marand
- District: Yamchi
- Rural District: Zu ol Bin

Population (2016)
  - Total: 778
- Time zone: UTC+3:30 (IRST)

Farfar (Persian: فارفار) (Note: Also romanized as Fārfār; also known as Parpar and Perper) is a village in Zu ol Bin Rural District of Yamchi District in Marand County, East Azerbaijan province, Iran.

== Demographics ==
=== Population ===
At the time of the 2006 National Census, the village's population was 723 in 188 households. The following census in 2011 counted 732 people in 220 households. The 2016 census measured the population of the village as 778 people in 248 households.
