= Yagan (disambiguation) =

Yagan (1795–1833), was an Indigenous Australian warrior.

Yagan may also refer to:

== People ==
- Ben Yagan (born 1995), Belgian-Armenian footballer
- Hiraç Yagan (born 1989), Armenian footballer
- Ivan Yagan (born 1989), Armenian footballer
- Sam Yagan (born 1977), American Internet entrepreneur
- Yagan people, an ethnic group of Argentina and Chile

== Other uses ==
- Yağan, Aksaray, a village in Turkey
- Yagan Square, in Perth, Western Australia
- Yagan language, the language of the ethnic group
- Yagan (dog), an extinct domesticated fox
- Yagan Railway, a Japanese railway company
- Yagan (poetic form), a form of Burmese satirical poem

== See also ==
- Jagan (disambiguation)
- Yaghan (disambiguation)
- Yakan (disambiguation)
