= Baruj =

Village in East Azerbaijan province, Iran

Baruj Persian: باروج
- Village
- Location within Iran
- Coordinates: 38°30′13″N 45°41′38″E
- Country: Iran
- Province: East Azerbaijan
- County: Marand
- District: Yamchi
- Rural District: Zu ol Bin

Population (2016)
  - Total: 2,481
- Time zone: UTC+3:30 (IRST)

Baruj (Persian: باروج) (Note: Also romanized as Barooj and Bārūj; also known as Bare, Bareh, Bārī, Bary, Bereh, and Pareh) is a village in Zu ol Bin Rural District of Yamchi District in Marand County, East Azerbaijan province, Iran.

== Demographics ==
=== Population ===
At the time of the 2006 National Census, the village's population was 2,340 in 574 households. The following census in 2011 counted 2,447 people in 692 households. The 2016 census measured the population of the village as 2,481 people in 743 households.
