= Yengejeh-ye Kord =

Yengejeh-ye Kord ينگجه كرد
- Village
- Location within Iran
- Coordinates: 38°40′48″N 45°19′48″E
- Country: Iran
- Province: East Azerbaijan
- County: Marand
- Bakhsh: Yamchi
- Rural District: Yekanat

Population (2006)
  - Total: 36
- Time zone: UTC+3:30 (IRST)
  - Summer (DST): UTC+4:30 (IRDT)

Yengejeh-ye Kord (Persian: ينگجه كرد) is a village in Yekanat Rural District, Yamchi District, Marand County, East Azerbaijan Province, Iran. At the 2006 census, its population was 36, living in 12 families.
