= Markid Kharabehsi =

Markid Kharabehsi مركيدخرابه سي
- Village
- Location within Iran
- Coordinates: 38°37′51″N 45°32′11″E
- Country: Iran
- Province: East Azerbaijan
- County: Marand
- Bakhsh: Yamchi
- Rural District: Zolbin

Population (2006)
  - Total: 55
- Time zone: UTC+3:30 (IRST)
  - Summer (DST): UTC+4:30 (IRDT)

Markid Kharabehsi (Persian: مركيدخرابه سي, also Romanized as Markīd Kharābehsī; also known as Khairābād Masjid, Kharaba-Marchit, Kharābeh, Kharābeh Markīt, Margīd, Markīd, Markīd-e Khvābahsī, Markīd Kharābeh, and Masjed Kheyrābād) is a village in Zolbin Rural District, Yamchi District, Marand County, East Azerbaijan Province, Iran. At the 2006 census, its population was 55, in 15 families.
