= Qush Qayahsi, Marand =

Qush Qayahsi قوش قيه سي
- Village
- Location within Iran
- Coordinates: 38°33′49″N 45°23′51″E
- Country: Iran
- Province: East Azerbaijan
- County: Marand
- Bakhsh: Yamchi
- Rural District: Zolbin

Population (2006)
  - Total: 147
- Time zone: UTC+3:30 (IRST)
  - Summer (DST): UTC+4:30 (IRDT)

Qush Qayahsi (Persian: قوش قيه سي, also Romanized as Qūsh Qayahsī; also known as Qūshqāyā) is a village in Zolbin Rural District, Yamchi District, Marand County, East Azerbaijan Province, Iran. At the 2006 census, its population was 147, in 31 families.
