= Amirabad, Marand =

Village in East Azerbaijan province, Iran

Amirabad Persian: اميراباد
- Village
- Location within Iran
- Coordinates: 38°45′58″N 45°17′32″E
- Country: Iran
- Province: East Azerbaijan
- County: Marand
- District: Yamchi
- Rural District: Yekanat

Population (2016)
  - Total: 134
- Time zone: UTC+3:30 (IRST)

Amirabad (Persian: اميراباد) (Note: Also romanized as Amīrābād) is a village in Yekanat Rural District of Yamchi District in Marand County, East Azerbaijan province, Iran.

== Demographics ==
=== Population ===
At the time of the 2006 National Census, the village's population was 131 in 28 households. The following census in 2011 counted 134 people in 36 households. The 2016 census measured the population of the village as 134 people in 37 households.
