= Qamesh Aghol =

Village in East Azerbaijan province, Iran

Qamesh Aghol Persian: قميش اغل
- Village
- Location within Iran
- Coordinates: 38°32′22″N 45°28′17″E
- Country: Iran
- Province: East Azerbaijan
- County: Marand
- District: Yamchi
- Rural District: Zu ol Bin

Population (2016)
  - Total: 913
- Time zone: UTC+3:30 (IRST)

Qamesh Aghol (Persian: قميش اغل) (Note: Also romanized as Qamesh Āghol; also known as Aḩdāqeh, Ajaga, Ājdāgheh, Azhdaga, Qamesh Āghel, Qamīsh Āghol, and Qeshlāq Qamīsh Āghūl) is a village in Zu ol Bin Rural District of Yamchi District in Marand County, East Azerbaijan province, Iran.

== Demographics ==
=== Population ===
At the time of the 2006 National Census, the village's population was 833 in 200 households. The following census in 2011 counted 886 people in 216 households. The 2016 census measured the population of the village as 913 people in 256 households.
