= Yengejeh-ye Yaranmish =

Yengejeh-ye Yaranmish ينگجه يارانميش
- Village
- Location within Iran
- Coordinates: 38°39′32″N 45°20′40″E
- Country: Iran
- Province: East Azerbaijan
- County: Marand
- Bakhsh: Yamchi
- Rural District: Yekanat

Population (2006)
  - Total: 8
- Time zone: UTC+3:30 (IRST)
  - Summer (DST): UTC+4:30 (IRDT)

Yengejeh-ye Yaranmish (Persian: ينگجه يارانميش, also Romanized as Yengejeh-ye Yārānmīsh; also known as Yengejeh-ye Bālā, Yengejeh-ye Yārāmesh, and Yengejeh-ye Yārānesh) is a village in Yekanat Rural District, Yamchi District, Marand County, East Azerbaijan Province, Iran. At the 2006 census, its population was 8, in 6 families.
