= Yekan-e Sadi =

Village in East Azerbaijan province, Iran

Yekan-e Sadi Persian: یکان سعدی
- Village
- Location within Iran
- Coordinates: 38°44′18″N 45°26′04″E
- Country: Iran
- Province: East Azerbaijan
- County: Marand
- District: Yamchi
- Rural District: Yekanat

Population (2016)
  - Total: 508
- Time zone: UTC+3:30 (IRST)

Yekan-e Sadi (Persian: یکان سعدی) (Note: Also romanized as Yekān-e Sa‘dī; also known as Sa‘dī, Saiyid Ali, and Seyyed ‘Alī) is a village in Yekanat Rural District of Yamchi District in Marand County, East Azerbaijan province, Iran.

== Demographics ==
=== Population ===
At the time of the 2006 National Census, the village's population was 694 in 161 households. The following census in 2011 counted 575 people in 160 households. The 2016 census measured the population of the village as 508,787 people in 1 households.
