= Yekan-e Olya =

Village in East Azerbaijan province, Iran

Yekan-e Olya Persian: يكان عليا
- Village
- Location within Iran
- Coordinates: 38°39′36″N 45°27′15″E
- Country: Iran
- Province: East Azerbaijan
- County: Marand
- District: Yamchi
- Rural District: Yekanat

Population (2016)
  - Total: 754
- Time zone: UTC+3:30 (IRST)

Yekan-e Olya (Persian: يكان عليا) (Note: Also romanized as Yekān ‘Olya and Yekān-e ‘Olyā; also known as Echan Yukāri, Eshan Bālā, Yakan Olya, Yekān Kahrīz, Yekān Kahrīz Bālā, Yekān Kahrīz-e Bālā, Yekān-e Kahrīz-e ‘Olyā, and Yukhari-Yechan) is a village in Yekanat Rural District of Yamchi District in Marand County, East Azerbaijan province, Iran.

== Demographics ==
=== Population ===
At the time of the 2006 National Census, the village's population was 1,156 in 303 households. The following census in 2011 counted 1,048 people in 308 households. The 2016 census measured the population of the village as 754 people in 242 households.
