= 2023 Indian motorcycle Grand Prix =

Motorcycle races in Greater Noida

(India) 2023 Indian Grand Prix
Race details
- Race 13 of 20 races in the 2023 Grand Prix motorcycle racing season
- Date: 24 September 2023
- Official name: IndianOil Grand Prix of India
- Location: Buddh International Circuit; Greater Noida, India
- Course: Permanent racing facility; 5.010 km (3.113 mi)

MotoGP
Pole position
Rider	(Italy) Marco Bezzecchi	Ducati
Time	1:43.947	
Fastest lap
Rider	(Italy) Marco Bezzecchi	Ducati
Time	1:45.028 on lap 3	
Podium
First	(Italy) Marco Bezzecchi	Ducati
Second	(Spain) Jorge Martín	Ducati
Third	(France) Fabio Quartararo	Yamaha

Moto2
Pole position
Rider	(United Kingdom) Jake Dixon	Kalex
Time	2:01.924	
Fastest lap
Rider	(Spain) Pedro Acosta	Kalex
Time	1:52.104 on lap 2	
Podium
First	(Spain) Pedro Acosta	Kalex
Second	(Italy) Tony Arbolino	Kalex
Third	(United States) Joe Roberts	Kalex

Moto3
Pole position
Rider	(Spain) Jaume Masià	Honda
Time	2:09.336	
Fastest lap
Rider	(Japan) Ayumu Sasaki	Husqvarna
Time	1:59.472 on lap 8	
Podium
First	(Spain) Jaume Masià	Honda
Second	(Japan) Kaito Toba	Honda
Third	(Japan) Ayumu Sasaki	Husqvarna

The 2023 Indian motorcycle Grand Prix (officially known as the IndianOil Grand Prix of India) was the thirteenth round of the 2023 Grand Prix motorcycle racing season. It was held at the Buddh International Circuit in Greater Noida on 24 September 2023.

All of the races were shortened in distance because of the requests from riders and the official tyre suppliers due to the high heat and humidity in the circuit. The MotoGP sprint and both Moto2 and Moto3 races were shortened by a lap, while the MotoGP main race on Sunday was shortened by three laps.

== Practice ==
=== MotoGP ===
==== Combined Free Practice 1-2 ====
Free Practice sessions on Friday and Saturday do not determine riders to qualify for Q2.

Fastest session lap

Pos.	No.	Biker	Constructor	Free practice times	
Pos.	No.	Biker	Constructor	FP1	FP2
1	72	(Italy) Marco Bezzecchi	Ducati	1:45.990	1:45.398
2	73	(Spain) Álex Márquez	Ducati	1:47.017	1:45.601
3	10	(Italy) Luca Marini	Ducati	1:46.609	1:45.604
4	89	(Spain) Jorge Martín	Ducati	1:46.610	1:45.659
5	33	(South Africa) Brad Binder	KTM	1:46.310	1:45.697
6	41	(Spain) Aleix Espargaró	Aprilia	1:46.974	1:45.701
7	93	(Spain) Marc Márquez	Honda	1:46.129	1:45.723
8	1	(Italy) Francesco Bagnaia	Ducati	1:47.050	1:45.725
9	43	(Australia) Jack Miller	KTM	1:47.371	1:45.853
10	36	(Spain) Joan Mir	Honda	1:46.805	1:45.860
11	49	(Italy) Fabio Di Giannantonio	Ducati	1:46.778	1:45.875
12	37	(Spain) Augusto Fernández	KTM	1:46.827	1:45.875
13	21	(Italy) Franco Morbidelli	Yamaha	1:48.105	1:45.896
14	20	(France) Fabio Quartararo	Yamaha	1:47.514	1:45.947
15	12	(Spain) Maverick Viñales	Aprilia	1:46.478	1:46.293
16	30	(Japan) Takaaki Nakagami	Honda	1:46.966	1:46.328
17	44	(Spain) Pol Espargaró	KTM	1:47.480	1:46.341
18	5	(France) Johann Zarco	Ducati	1:46.576	1:46.354
19	25	(Spain) Raúl Fernández	Aprilia	1:46.371	1:46.367
20	88	(Portugal) Miguel Oliveira	Aprilia	1:47.419	1:46.506
21	6	(Germany) Stefan Bradl	Honda	1:48.745	1:46.928
22	51	(Italy) Michele Pirro	Ducati	1:48.028	1:47.197
OFFICIAL MOTOGP COMBINED FREE PRACTICE TIMES REPORT

==== Practice session ====
The top ten riders (written in bold) qualified for Q2.

Pos.	No.	Biker	Constructor	
Pos.	No.	Biker	Constructor	Time results
1	10	**(Italy) Luca Marini**	**Ducati**	**1:44.782**
2	89	**(Spain) Jorge Martín**	**Ducati**	**1:44.790**
3	41	**(Spain) Aleix Espargaró**	**Aprilia**	**1:44.833**
4	93	**(Spain) Marc Márquez**	**Honda**	**1:45.117**
5	72	**(Italy) Marco Bezzecchi**	**Ducati**	**1:45.202**
6	12	**(Spain) Maverick Viñales**	**Aprilia**	**1:45.213**
7	1	**(Italy) Francesco Bagnaia**	**Ducati**	**1:45.280**
8	20	**(France) Fabio Quartararo**	**Yamaha**	**1:45.291**
9	5	**(France) Johann Zarco**	**Ducati**	**1:45.305**
10	36	**(Spain) Joan Mir**	**Honda**	**1:45.332**
11	49	(Italy) Fabio Di Giannantonio	Ducati	1:45.406
12	33	(South Africa) Brad Binder	KTM	1:45.539
13	73	(Spain) Álex Márquez	Ducati	1:45.550
14	21	(Italy) Franco Morbidelli	Yamaha	1:45.576
15	37	(Spain) Augusto Fernández	KTM	1:45.589
16	25	(Spain) Raúl Fernández	Aprilia	1:45.712
17	88	(Portugal) Miguel Oliveira	Aprilia	1:45.863
18	43	(Australia) Jack Miller	KTM	1:45.961
19	44	(Spain) Pol Espargaró	KTM	1:46.111
20	6	(Germany) Stefan Bradl	Honda	1:46.276
21	30	(Japan) Takaaki Nakagami	Honda	1:46.310
22	51	(Italy) Michele Pirro	Ducati	1:46.573
OFFICIAL MOTOGP PRACTICE TIMES REPORT

==== Free practice ====
Pos.	No.	Biker	Constructor	
Pos.	No.	Biker	Constructor	Time results
1	89	(Spain) Jorge Martín	Ducati	1:49.017
2	5	(France) Johann Zarco	Ducati	1:49.868
3	1	(Italy) Francesco Bagnaia	Ducati	1:49.932
4	88	(Portugal) Miguel Oliveira	Aprilia	1:50.148
5	43	(Australia) Jack Miller	KTM	1:50.180
6	10	(Italy) Luca Marini	Ducati	1:50.469
7	37	(Spain) Augusto Fernández	KTM	1:50.756
8	72	(Italy) Marco Bezzecchi	Ducati	1:51.361
9	20	(France) Fabio Quartararo	Yamaha	1:51.480
10	25	(Spain) Raúl Fernández	Aprilia	1:53.023
11	36	(Spain) Joan Mir	Honda	1:53.780
12	33	(South Africa) Brad Binder	KTM	1:54.422
13	12	(Spain) Maverick Viñales	Aprilia	1:55.904
14	93	(Spain) Marc Márquez	Honda	1:56.227
15	6	(Germany) Stefan Bradl	Honda	1:56.716
16	51	(Italy) Michele Pirro	Ducati	1:57.519
17	21	(Italy) Franco Morbidelli	Yamaha	1:57.664
18	41	(Spain) Aleix Espargaró	Aprilia	1:58.982
19	49	(Italy) Fabio Di Giannantonio	KTM	1:59.043
20	30	(Japan) Takaaki Nakagami	Honda	2:02.497
21	44	(Spain) Pol Espargaró	KTM	2:06.745
OFFICIAL MOTOGP FREE PRACTICE WET TIMES REPORT

=== Moto2 ===
==== Combined Practice 1-2-3 ====
The top fourteen riders (written in bold) qualified for Q2.

Fastest session lap

Pos.	No.	Biker	Constructor	Free practice times		
Pos.	No.	Biker	Constructor	P1	P2	P3
1	18	**(Spain) Manuel González**	**Kalex**	1:53.796	1:52.609	**1:51.608**
2	37	**(Spain) Pedro Acosta**	**Kalex**	1:52.878	1:52.170	**1:51.725**
3	13	**(Italy)** **Celestino Vietti**	**Kalex**	1:54.862	1:52.319	**1:51.887**
4	16	**(United States) Joe Roberts**	**Kalex**	1:53.808	1:53.037	**1:51.901**
5	21	**(Spain) Alonso López**	**Boscoscuro**	1:54.124	1:52.986	**1:51.919**
6	79	**(Japan) Ai Ogura**	**Kalex**	1:53.495	1:52.188	**1:51.988**
7	12	**(Czech Republic) Filip Salač**	**Kalex**	1:53.660	1:52.715	**1:52.009**
8	71	**(Italy)** **Dennis Foggia**	**Kalex**	1:53.838	1:52.912	**1:52.012**
9	14	**(Italy)** **Tony Arbolino**	**Kalex**	1:53.756	**1:52.105**	1:52.199
10	22	**(United Kingdom) Sam Lowes**	**Kalex**	1:53.838	1:52.947	**1:52.111**
11	42	**(Spain) Marcos Ramírez**	**Kalex**	1:53.992	1:52.822	**1:52.121**
12	96	**(United Kingdom) Jake Dixon**	**Kalex**	1:53.557	1:52.642	**1:52.123**
13	52	**(Spain) Jeremy Alcoba**	**Kalex**	1:55.063	1:53.374	**1:52.136**
14	35	**(Thailand) Somkiat Chantra**	**Kalex**	1:52.596	1:52.451	**1:52.190**
15	84	(Netherlands) Zonta van den Goorbergh	Kalex	1:54.138	1:53.339	**1:52.192**
16	28	(Spain) Izan Guevara	Kalex	1:54.107	1:52.916	**1:52.265**
17	7	(Spain) Arón Canet	Kalex	1:54.241	1:52.800	**1:52.309**
18	64	(Netherlands) Bo Bendsneyder	Kalex	1:54.375	1:53.533	**1:52.357**
19	72	(Spain) Borja Gómez	Kalex	1:55.221	1:53.819	**1:52.459**
20	3	(Germany) Lukas Tulovic	Kalex	1:53.940	1:52.914	**1:52.507**
21	11	(Spain) Sergio García	Kalex	1:54.812	1:52.962	**1:52.522**
22	33	(United Kingdom) Rory Skinner	Kalex	1:54.278	1:54.195	**1:52.573**
23	23	(Japan) Taiga Hada	Kalex	1:55.034	1:53.948	**1:52.654**
24	7	(Belgium) Barry Baltus	Kalex	1:54.675	1:53.379	**1:52.671**
25	15	(South Africa) Darryn Binder	Kalex	1:54.164	1:53.066	**1:52.703**
26	54	(Spain) Fermín Aldeguer	Boscoscuro	1:54.805	1:53.602	**1:52.712**
27	4	(United States) Sean Dylan Kelly	Forward	1:54.662	1:53.787	**1:52.985**
28	75	(Spain) Albert Arenas	Kalex	1:55.864	1:54.398	**1:53.330**
29	67	(Italy) Alberto Surra	Forward	1:54.795	1:54.087	**1:53.628**
30	5	(Japan) Kohta Nozane	Kalex	1:55.895	1:53.771	**1:53.723**
Source : OFFICIAL MOTO2 COMBINED PRACTICE TIMES REPORT

=== Moto3 ===
==== Combined Practice 1-2-3 ====
The top fourteen riders (written in bold) qualified for Q2.

Fastest session lap

Pos.	No.	Biker	Constructor	Practice times		
Pos.	No.	Biker	Constructor	P1	P2	P3
1	10	**(Brazil) Diogo Moreira**	**KTM**	2:00.465	2:00.363	**1:59.375**
2	95	**(Netherlands) Collin Veijer**	**Husqvarna**	2:00.777	1:59.566	**1:59.438**
3	71	**(Japan) Ayumu Sasaki**	**Husqvarna**	2:01.383	2:00.412	**1:59.516**
4	72	(Japan) **Taiyo Furusato**	**Honda**	2:02.698	2:00.934	**1:59.586**
5	18	**(Italy) Matteo Bertelle**	**Honda**	2:00.664	2:00.538	**1:59.627**
6	5	(Spain) **Jaume Masià**	**Honda**	2:00.324	**1:59.752**	1:59.759
7	99	**(Spain)** **José Antonio Rueda**	**KTM**	2:01.060	2:00.530	**1:59.775**
8	80	**(Colombia) David Alonso**	**Gas Gas**	2:01.882	2:00.195	**1:59.837**
9	54	**(Italy) Riccardo Rossi**	**Honda**	2:01.373	2:00.328	**1:59.859**
10	48	**(Spain) Iván Ortolá**	**KTM**	2:01.482	2:02.555	**1:59.951**
11	66	(Australia) **Joel Kelso**	**CFMoto**	2:00.950	2:00.669	**1:59.976**
12	38	**(Italy) David Salvador**	**KTM**	2:01.532	2:01.884	**1:59.977**
13	82	**(Italy) Stefano Nepa**	**KTM**	2:00.615	2:00.122	**2:00.090**
14	44	**(Spain)** **David Muñoz**	**KTM**	2:02.662	2:01.061	**2:00.154**
15	27	(Japan) Kaito Toba	Honda	2:01.629	2:01.451	**2:00.177**
16	19	(United Kingdom) Scott Ogden	Honda	2:02.438	2:01.758	**2:00.199**
17	96	(Spain) Daniel Holgado	KTM	2:03.082	2:00.917	**2:00.446**
18	53	(Turkey) Deniz Öncü	KTM	2:01.708	**2:00.607**	2:00.608
19	70	(United Kingdom) Joshua Whatley	Honda	2:02.538	2:01.068	**2:00.665**
20	6	(Japan) Ryusei Yamanaka	Gas Gas	2:01.938	2:01.688	**2:00.751**
21	24	(Japan) Tatsuki Suzuki	Honda	2:02.107	**2:00.804**	NC
22	43	(Spain) Xavier Artigas	CFMoto	2:01.700	2:01.450	**2:00.806**
23	7	(Italy) Filippo Farioli	KTM	2:02.102	**2:01.025**	2:01.031
24	63	(Malaysia) Syarifuddin Azman	KTM	2:01.662	2:01.386	**2:01.164**
25	64	(Indonesia) Mario Aji	Honda	2:03.548	2:02.754	**2:01.521**
26	20	(France) Lorenzo Fellon	KTM	2:03.105	2:02.754	**2:01.521**
27	57	(Malaysia) Danial Shahril	Honda	2:04.486	2:03.875	**2:01.898**
28	22	(Spain) Ana Carrasco	KTM	2:04.874	2:02.818	**2:01.919**
105% time:				2:06.341	2:05.544	2:05.343
DNQ	3	(India) KY Ahamed	Honda	2:08.281	**2:06.082**	2:06.435
Source : OFFICIAL MOTO3 COMBINED PRACTICE TIMES REPORT

== Qualifying ==
=== MotoGP ===
Fastest session lap

Pos.	No.	Biker	Constructor	Qualifying times		Final grid	Row
Pos.	No.	Biker	Constructor	Q1	Q2	Final grid	Row
1	72	(Italy) Marco Bezzecchi	Ducati	Qualified in Q2	1:43.947	1	1
2	89	(Spain) Jorge Martín	Ducati	Qualified in Q2	1:43.990	2	1
3	1	(Italy) Francesco Bagnaia	Ducati	Qualified in Q2	1:44.203	3	1
4	10	(Italy) Luca Marini	Ducati	Qualified in Q2	1:44.215	4	2
5	36	(Spain) Joan Mir	Honda	Qualified in Q2	1:44.454	5	2
6	93	(Spain) Marc Márquez	Honda	Qualified in Q2	1:44.469	6	2
7	5	(France) Johann Zarco	Ducati	Qualified in Q2	1:44.515	7	3
8	20	(France) Fabio Quartararo	Yamaha	Qualified in Q2	1:44.724	8	3
9	12	(Spain) Maverick Viñales	Aprilia	Qualified in Q2	1:44.741	9	3
10	41	(Spain) Aleix Espargaró	Aprilia	Qualified in Q2	1:44.750	10	4
11	25	(Spain) Raúl Fernández	Aprilia	1:44.410	2:16.885	11	4
12	73	(Spain) Álex Márquez	Ducati	1:44.519	NC	12	4
13	49	(Italy) Fabio Di Giannantonio	Ducati	1:44.529	N/A	13	5
14	33	(South Africa) Brad Binder	KTM	1:44.651	N/A	14	5
15	30	(Japan) Takaaki Nakagami	Honda	1:44.735	N/A	15	5
16	43	(Australia) Jack Miller	KTM	1:45.030	N/A	16	6
17	21	(Italy) Franco Morbidelli	Yamaha	1:45.037	N/A	17	6
18	37	(Spain) Augusto Fernández	KTM	1:45.066	N/A	18	6
19	88	(Portugal) Miguel Oliveira	Aprilia	1:45.375	N/A	19	7
20	44	(Spain) Pol Espargaró	KTM	1:45.452	N/A	20	7
21	6	(Germany) Stefan Bradl	Honda	1:45.517	N/A	21	7
22	51	(Italy) Michele Pirro	Ducati	1:46.147	N/A	22	8
OFFICIAL MOTOGP QUALIFYING RESULTS

=== Moto2 ===
Fastest session lap

Pos.	No.	Biker	Constructor	Qualifying times		Final grid	Row
Pos.	No.	Biker	Constructor	Q1	Q2	Final grid	Row
1	96	(United Kingdom) Jake Dixon	Kalex	Qualified in Q2	2:01.924	1	1
2	37	(Spain) Pedro Acosta	Kalex	Qualified in Q2	2:01.956	2	1
3	11	(Spain) Sergio García	Kalex	2:02.959	2:02.192	3	1
4	84	(Netherlands) Zonta van den Goorbergh	Kalex	2:02.614	2:02.271	4	2
5	15	(South Africa) Darryn Binder	Kalex	2:03.247	2:02.602	5	2
6	21	(Spain) Alonso López	Boscoscuro	Qualified in Q2	2:02.864	6	2
7	14	(Italy) Tony Arbolino	Kalex	Qualified in Q2	2:02.958	7	3
8	16	(United States) Joe Roberts	Kalex	Qualified in Q2	2:03.262	8	3
9	35	(Thailand) Somkiat Chantra	Kalex	Qualified in Q2	2:03.370	9	3
10	13	(Italy) Celestino Vietti	Kalex	Qualified in Q2	2:03.374	10	4
11	42	(Spain) Marcos Ramírez	Kalex	Qualified in Q2	2:03.446	11	4
12	22	(United Kingdom) Sam Lowes	Kalex	Qualified in Q2	2:03.536	12	4
13	7	(Belgium) Barry Baltus	Kalex	2:03.111	2:03.706	13	5
14	52	(Spain) Jeremy Alcoba	Kalex	Qualified in Q2	2:04.208	14	5
15	79	(Japan) Ai Ogura	Kalex	Qualified in Q2	2:04.751	15	5
16	18	(Spain) Manuel González	Kalex	Qualified in Q2	2:04.871	16	6
17	12	(Czech Republic) Filip Salač	Kalex	Qualified in Q2	2:05.123	17	6
18	71	(Netherlands) Dennis Foggia	Kalex	Qualified in Q2	2:05.352	18	6
19	23	(Japan) Taiga Hada	Kalex	2:03.263	N/A	19	7
20	40	(Spain) Arón Canet	Kalex	2:03.322	N/A	20	7
21	54	(Spain) Fermín Aldeguer	Boscoscuro	2:03.501	N/A	21	7
22	33	(United Kingdom) Rory Skinner	Kalex	2:21.385	N/A	22	8
23	64	(Netherlands) Bo Bendsneyder	Kalex	2:04.312	N/A	23	8
24	5	(Japan) Kohta Nozane	Kalex	2:04.494	N/A	24	8
25	4	(United States) Sean Dylan Kelly	Forward	2:04.727	N/A	25	9
26	28	(Spain) Izan Guevara	Kalex	2:05.015	N/A	26	9
27	72	(Spain) Borja Gómez	Kalex	2:05.015	N/A	27	9
28	67	(Italy) Alberto Surra	Forward	2:05.419	N/A	28	10
29	75	(Spain) Albert Arenas	Kalex	2:05.562	N/A	29	10
OFFICIAL MOTO2 QUALIFYING RESULTS

=== Moto3 ===
Fastest session lap

Pos.	No.	Biker	Constructor	Qualifying times		Final grid	Row
Pos.	No.	Biker	Constructor	Q1	Q2	Final grid	Row
1	5	(Spain) Jaume Masià	Honda	Qualified in Q2	2:09.336	1	1
2	18	(Italy) Matteo Bertelle	Honda	Qualified in Q2	2:10.063	2	1
3	71	(Japan) Ayumu Sasaki	Husqvarna	Qualified in Q2	2:10.104	3	1
4	19	(United Kingdom) Scott Ogden	Honda	Qualified in Q2	2:10.126	4	2
5	27	(Japan) Kaito Toba	Honda	Qualified in Q2	2:10.735	5	2
6	10	(Brazil) Diogo Moreira	KTM	Qualified in Q2	2:10.783	6	2
7	82	(Italy) Stefano Nepa	KTM	Qualified in Q2	2:10.852	7	3
8	72	(Japan) Taiyo Furusato	Honda	Qualified in Q2	2:10.867	8	3
9	95	(Netherlands) Collin Veijer	Husqvarna	Qualified in Q2	2:10.968	9	3
10	38	(Spain) David Salvador	KTM	Qualified in Q2	2:11.018	10	4
11	53	(Turkey) Deniz Öncü	KTM	1:59.070	2:11.282	11	4
12	6	(Japan) Ryusei Yamanaka	Gas Gas	1:59.930	2:11.330	12	4
13	48	(Spain) Iván Ortolá	KTM	Qualified in Q2	2:11.347	13	5
14	54	(United Kingdom) Riccardo Rossi	Honda	Qualified in Q2	2:11.963	14	5
15	44	(Spain) David Muñoz	KTM	Qualified in Q2	2:13.350	15	5
16	66	(Australia) Joel Kelso	CFMoto	Qualified in Q2	2:13.606	16	6
17	99	(Spain) José Antonio Rueda	KTM	Qualified in Q2	2:14.181	17	6
18	80	(Colombia) David Alonso	Gas Gas	Qualified in Q2	2:14.408	18	6
19	96	(Spain) Daniel Holgado	KTM	2:00.041	N/A	19	7
20	7	(Italy) Filippo Farioli	KTM	2:00.237	N/A	20	7
21	63	(Malaysia) Syarifuddin Azman	KTM	2:00.465	N/A	21	7
22	70	(United Kingdom) Joshua Whatley	Honda	2:00.611	N/A	22	8
23	43	(Netherlands) Xavier Artigas	CFMoto	2:00.662	N/A	23	8
24	64	(Indonesia) Mario Aji	Honda	2:01.032	N/A	24	8
25	22	(Spain) Ana Carrasco	KTM	2:01.146	N/A	25	9
26	57	(Malaysia) Danial Shahril	Honda	2:01.257	N/A	26	9
27	20	(France) Lorenzo Fellon	KTM	2:01.393	N/A	27	9
28	24	(Japan) Tatsuki Suzuki	Honda	NC	N/A	28	10
OFFICIAL MOTO3 QUALIFYING RESULTS

== MotoGP Sprint ==
The MotoGP Sprint was held on 23 September.

Pos.	No.	Rider	Team	Constructor	Laps	Time/Retired	Grid	Points
1	89	(Spain) Jorge Martín	Prima Pramac Racing	Ducati	11	19:18.836	2	12
2	1	(Italy) Francesco Bagnaia	Ducati Lenovo Team	Ducati	11	+1.389	3	9
3	93	(Spain) Marc Márquez	Repsol Honda Team	Honda	11	+2.405	6	7
4	33	(South Africa) Brad Binder	Red Bull KTM Factory Racing	KTM	11	+2.904	13	6
5	72	(Italy) Marco Bezzecchi	Mooney VR46 Racing Team	Ducati	11	+3.266	1	5
6	20	(France) Fabio Quartararo	Monster Energy Yamaha MotoGP	Yamaha	11	+4.327	8	4
7	43	(Australia) Jack Miller	Red Bull KTM Factory Racing	KTM	11	+7.172	15	3
8	12	(Spain) Maverick Viñales	Aprilia Racing	Aprilia	11	+8.798	9	2
9	25	(Spain) Raúl Fernández	CryptoData RNF MotoGP Team	Aprilia	11	+10.530	11	1
10	49	(Italy) Fabio Di Giannantonio	Gresini Racing MotoGP	Ducati	11	+10.826	12	
11	37	(Spain) Augusto Fernández	GasGas Factory Racing Tech3	KTM	11	+11.456	17	
12	88	(Portugal) Miguel Oliveira	CryptoData RNF MotoGP Team	Aprilia	11	+15.415	18	
13	30	(Japan) Takaaki Nakagami	LCR Honda Idemitsu	Honda	11	+17.437	14	
14	51	(Italy) Michele Pirro	Ducati Lenovo Team	Ducati	11	+23.714	21	
15	21	(Italy) Franco Morbidelli	Monster Energy Yamaha MotoGP	Yamaha	11	+36.468	16	
Ret	41	(Spain) Aleix Espargaró	Aprilia Racing	Aprilia	7	Accident	10	
Ret	5	(France) Johann Zarco	Prima Pramac Racing	Ducati	6	Accident damage	7	
Ret	36	(Spain) Joan Mir	Repsol Honda Team	Honda	3	Accident	5	
Ret	10	(Italy) Luca Marini	Mooney VR46 Racing Team	Ducati	0	Collision	4	
Ret	44	(Spain) Pol Espargaró	GasGas Factory Racing Tech3	KTM	0	Collision	19	
Ret	6	(Germany) Stefan Bradl	LCR Honda Castrol	Honda	0	Collision	20	
DNS	73	(Spain) Álex Márquez	Gresini Racing MotoGP	Ducati		Did not start		
Fastest sprint lap: (Italy) Marco Bezzecchi (Ducati) – 1:44.556 (lap 11)
OFFICIAL MOTOGP SPRINT REPORT

- Álex Márquez suffered a double rib fracture due to a crash in qualifying 1 and was declared unfit to compete for the rest of the weekend.

== Warm up practice ==
=== MotoGP ===
Jorge Martín set the best time 1:45.402 and was the fastest rider at this session ahead of Marco Bezzecchi and Fabio Quartararo.

== Race ==
=== MotoGP ===
Pos.	No.	Rider	Team	Constructor	Laps	Time/Retired	Grid	Points
1	72	(Italy) Marco Bezzecchi	Mooney VR46 Racing Team	Ducati	21	36:59.157	1	25
2	89	(Spain) Jorge Martín	Prima Pramac Racing	Ducati	21	+8.649	2	20
3	20	(France) Fabio Quartararo	Monster Energy Yamaha MotoGP	Yamaha	21	+8.855	7	16
4	33	(South Africa) Brad Binder	Red Bull KTM Factory Racing	KTM	21	+12.643	12	13
5	36	(Spain) Joan Mir	Repsol Honda Team	Honda	21	+13.214	4	11
6	5	(France) Johann Zarco	Prima Pramac Racing	Ducati	21	+14.673	6	10
7	21	(Italy) Franco Morbidelli	Monster Energy Yamaha MotoGP	Yamaha	21	+16.946	15	9
8	12	(Spain) Maverick Viñales	Aprilia Racing	Aprilia	21	+17.191	8	8
9	93	(Spain) Marc Márquez	Repsol Honda Team	Honda	21	+19.118	5	7
10	25	(Spain) Raúl Fernández	CryptoDATA RNF MotoGP Team	Aprilia	21	+26.504	10	6
11	30	(Japan) Takaaki Nakagami	LCR Honda Idemitsu	Honda	21	+28.521	13	5
12	88	(Portugal) Miguel Oliveira	CryptoDATA RNF MotoGP Team	Aprilia	21	+29.088	17	4
13	44	(Spain) Pol Espargaró	GasGas Factory Racing Tech3	KTM	21	+29.728	18	3
14	43	(Australia) Jack Miller	Red Bull KTM Factory Racing	KTM	21	+31.324	14	2
15	6	(Germany) Stefan Bradl	LCR Honda Castrol	Honda	21	+35.782	19	1
16	51	(Italy) Michele Pirro	Ducati Lenovo Team	Ducati	21	+49.242	20	
Ret	49	(Italy) Fabio Di Giannantonio	Gresini Racing MotoGP	Ducati	19	Shoulder pain	11	
Ret	1	(Italy) Francesco Bagnaia	Ducati Lenovo Team	Ducati	13	Accident	3	
Ret	41	(Spain) Aleix Espargaró	Aprilia Racing	Aprilia	11	Electronics	9	
Ret	37	(Spain) Augusto Fernández	GasGas Factory Racing Tech3	KTM	6	Mechanical	16	
DNS	10	(Italy) Luca Marini	Mooney VR46 Racing Team	Ducati		Did not start		
DNS	73	(Spain) Álex Márquez	Gresini Racing MotoGP	Ducati		Did not start		
Fastest lap: (Italy) Marco Bezzecchi (Ducati) – 1:45.028 (lap 3)
OFFICIAL MOTOGP RACE REPORT

- Luca Marini suffered a fractured left collarbone due to a crash in the sprint and was declared unfit to compete for the main race.

=== Moto2 ===
The race, scheduled to be run for 18 laps, was red-flagged after a multiple-rider collision at turn 1 during the first lap. The race was later restarted over 12 laps with the original starting grid.

Pos.	No.	Rider	Constructor	Laps	Time/Retired	Grid	Points
1	37	(Spain) Pedro Acosta	Kalex	12	22:29.844	2	25
2	14	(Italy) Tony Arbolino	Kalex	12	+3.543	7	20
3	16	(United States) Joe Roberts	Kalex	12	+6.506	8	16
4	11	(Spain) Sergio García	Kalex	12	+7.377	3	13
5	18	(Spain) Manuel González	Kalex	12	+7.903	16	11
6	84	(Netherlands) Zonta van den Goorbergh	Kalex	12	+11.437	4	10
7	15	(South Africa) Darryn Binder	Kalex	12	+11.644	5	9
8	7	(Belgium) Barry Baltus	Kalex	12	+12.225	13	8
9	24	(Spain) Marcos Ramírez	Kalex	12	+12.578	11	7
10	12	(Czech Republic) Filip Salač	Kalex	12	+12.790	17	6
11	71	(Italy) Dennis Foggia	Kalex	12	+13.262	18	5
12	54	(Spain) Fermín Aldeguer	Boscoscuro	12	+14.051	21	4
13	28	(Spain) Izan Guevara	Kalex	12	+15.250	26	3
14	75	(Spain) Albert Arenas	Kalex	12	+20.917	29	2
15	4	(United States) Sean Dylan Kelly	Forward	12	+23.286	25	1
16	72	(Spain) Borja Gómez	Kalex	12	+27.210	27	
17	67	(Italy) Alberto Surra	Forward	12	+28.219	28	
18	64	(Netherlands) Bo Bendsneyder	Kalex	12	+33.145	23	
19	22	(United Kingdom) Sam Lowes	Kalex	12	+54.448	12	
20	33	(United Kingdom) Rory Skinner	Kalex	12	+1:06.071	22	
21	79	(Japan) Ai Ogura	Kalex	11	+1 lap	15	
22	21	(Spain) Alonso López	Boscoscuro	11	+1 lap	6	
23	23	(Japan) Taiga Hada	Kalex	9	+3 laps	19	
Ret	5	(Japan) Kohta Nozane	Kalex	11	Accident	24	
Ret	52	(Spain) Jeremy Alcoba	Kalex	8	Accident	14	
Ret	96	(United Kingdom) Jake Dixon	Kalex	3	Accident	1	
Ret	40	(Spain) Arón Canet	Kalex	1	Accident	20	
Ret	35	(Thailand) Somkiat Chantra	Kalex	0	Accident	9	
DNS	13	(Italy) Celestino Vietti	Kalex		Did not restart	10	
DNS	3	(Germany) Lukas Tulovic	Kalex		Did not start		
Fastest lap: (Spain) Pedro Acosta (Kalex) – 1:52.104 (lap 2)
OFFICIAL MOTO2 RACE REPORT

- Lukas Tulovic suffered a fractured collarbone due to a crash in practice 3 and was declared unfit for the rest of the weekend.

=== Moto3 ===
Pos.	No.	Rider	Constructor	Laps	Time/Retired	Grid	Points
1	5	(Spain) Jaume Masià	Honda	16	31:58.245	1	25
2	27	(Japan) Kaito Toba	Honda	16	+5.477	5	20
3	71	(Japan) Ayumu Sasaki	Husqvarna	16	+5.784	3	16
4	96	(Spain) Daniel Holgado	KTM	16	+8.117	18	13
5	11	(Colombia) David Alonso	Gas Gas	16	+8.240	17	11
6	44	(Spain) David Muñoz	KTM	16	+9.426	14	10
7	54	(Italy) Riccardo Rossi	Honda	16	+9.430	13	9
8	48	(Spain) Iván Ortolá	KTM	16	+11.635	12	8
9	82	(Italy) Stefano Nepa	KTM	16	+12.409	7	7
10	99	(Spain) José Antonio Rueda	KTM	16	+16.106	16	6
11	7	(Italy) Filippo Farioli	KTM	16	+16.323	19	5
12	43	(Spain) Xavier Artigas	CFMoto	16	+16.431	22	4
13	10	(Brazil) Diogo Moreira	KTM	16	+19.304	6	3
14	53	(Turkey) Deniz Öncü	KTM	16	+22.933	28 (Note: Back of the grid start penalty.)	2
15	6	(Japan) Ryusei Yamanaka	Gas Gas	16	+26.053	11	1
16	70	(United Kingdom) Joshua Whatley	Honda	16	+30.601	21	
17	20	(France) Lorenzo Fellon	KTM	16	+35.035	26	
18	64	(Indonesia) Mario Aji	Honda	16	+35.196	23	
19	22	(Spain) Ana Carrasco	KTM	16	+35.375	24	
20	57	(Malaysia) Danial Shahril	Honda	16	+44.212	25	
21	63	(Malaysia) Syarifuddin Azman	KTM	16	+48.431	20	
Ret	95	(Netherlands) Collin Veijer	Husqvarna	15	Accident	9	
Ret	72	(Japan) Taiyo Furusato	Honda	11	Accident damage	8	
Ret	19	(United Kingdom) Scott Ogden	Honda	10	Collision	4	
Ret	24	(Japan) Tatsuki Suzuki	Honda	10	Collision	27	
Ret	38	(Spain) David Salvador	KTM	4	Accident	10	
Ret	18	(Italy) Matteo Bertelle	Honda	3	Accident	2	
Ret	66	(Australia) Joel Kelso	CFMoto	1	Accident	15	
DNS	55	(Italy) Romano Fenati	Honda		Did not start		
DNQ	3	(India) KY Ahamed	Honda		Did not qualify		
Fastest lap: (Japan) Ayumu Sasaki (Husqvarna) – 1:59.472 (lap 8)
OFFICIAL MOTO3 RACE REPORT

- Romano Fenati was declared unfit due to a foot fracture and withdrew from the race.

== Championship standings after the race ==
Below are the standings for the top five riders, constructors, and teams after the round.

=== MotoGP ===
Riders' Championship standings

Pos.	Rider	Points
1	(Italy) Francesco Bagnaia	292
2	(Spain) Jorge Martín	279
3	(Italy) Marco Bezzecchi	248
4	(South Africa) Brad Binder	192
5	(Spain) Aleix Espargaró	160

Constructors' Championship standings

	Pos.	Constructor	Points
	1	(Italy) Ducati	453
	2	(Austria) KTM	253
	3	(Italy) Aprilia	228
1	4	(Japan) Yamaha	125
1	5	(Japan) Honda	123

Teams' Championship standings

	Pos.	Team	Points
	1	(Italy) Prima Pramac Racing	436
	2	(Italy) Mooney VR46 Racing Team	383
	3	(Italy) Ducati Lenovo Team	327
1	4	(Austria) Red Bull KTM Factory Racing	301
1	5	(Italy) Aprilia Racing	298

=== Moto2 ===
Riders' Championship standings

Pos.	Rider	Points
1	(Spain) Pedro Acosta	236
2	(Italy) Tony Arbolino	197
3	(United Kingdom) Jake Dixon	146
4	(Spain) Arón Canet	116
5	(Spain) Alonso López	116

Constructors' Championship standings

Pos.	Constructor	Points
1	(Germany) Kalex	320
2	(Italy) Boscoscuro	159
3	(Switzerland) Forward	1

Teams' Championship standings

Pos.	Team	Points
1	(Finland) Red Bull KTM Ajo	297
2	(Belgium) Elf Marc VDS Racing Team	271
3	(Italy) GT Trevisan Speed Up	204
4	(Spain) Pons Wegow Los40	192
5	(Japan) Idemitsu Honda Team Asia	164

=== Moto3 ===
Riders' Championship standings

	Pos.	Rider	Points
	1	(Spain) Daniel Holgado	174
1	2	(Spain) Jaume Masià	174
1	3	(Japan) Ayumu Sasaki	173
1	4	(Colombia) David Alonso	151
1	5	(Turkey) Deniz Öncü	147

Constructors' Championship standings

Pos.	Constructor	Points
1	(Austria) KTM	272
2	(Japan) Honda	215
3	(Sweden) Husqvarna	178
4	(Spain) Gas Gas	168
5	(China) CFMoto	70

Teams' Championship standings

Pos.	Team	Points
1	(Finland) Red Bull KTM Ajo	241
2	(Germany) Liqui Moly Husqvarna Intact GP	231
3	(Luxembourg) Leopard Racing	224
4	(Italy) Angeluss MTA Team	211
5	(Spain) Gaviota GasGas Aspar Team	206

== Notes ==
Previous race: 2023 San Marino Grand Prix	FIM Grand Prix World Championship; 2023 season	Next race: 2023 Japanese Grand Prix
Previous race: None	Indian motorcycle Grand Prix	Next race: None
