= Yakan =

Yakan may refer to:

- Yakan people, a community of the Philippines
- Yakan language, a language of the Philippines
- Yakan movement, a religious movement in Uganda
- Cape Yakan, in Russia

== People with the name ==
- Adly Yakan Pasha (1864–1933), Egyptian politician
- Fathi Yakan (1933–2009), Lebanese cleric and politician
- Hesham Yakan (born 1962), Egyptian football player
- Ibrahim Yakan (1900–?), Egyptian football player
- Tuba Yakan (born 1991), Turkish martial artist

== See also ==
- Iacan
- Yagan (disambiguation)
- Yaghan (disambiguation)
- Yaka (disambiguation)
- Yekan (disambiguation)
