= Yamchi =

City in East Azerbaijan province, Iran

Yamchi Persian: یامچی
- City
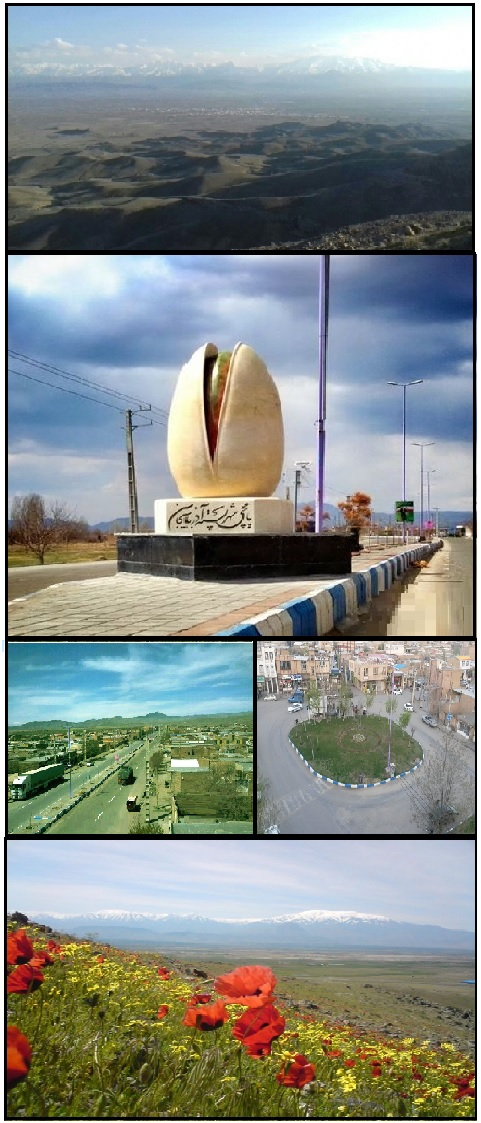

- Location within Iran
- Coordinates: 38°31′21″N 45°38′24″E
- Country: Iran
- Province: East Azerbaijan
- County: Marand
- District: Yamchi

Population (2016)
  - Total: 10,392
- Time zone: UTC+3:30 (IRST)

Yamchi (Persian: یامچی) (Note: Also romanized as Yāmchī) is a city in, and the capital of, Yamchi District in Marand County, East Azerbaijan province, Iran. It also serves as the administrative center for Zu ol Bin Rural District.

== Demographics ==
=== Population ===
At the time of the 2006 National Census, the city's population was 9,320 in 2,301 households. The following census in 2011 counted 9,832 people in 2,915 households. The 2016 census measured the population of the city as 10,392 people in 3,208 households.
