= Yekan-e Kahriz =

Village in East Azerbaijan province, Iran

Yekan-e Kahriz Persian: يكان كهريز
- Village
- Location within Iran
- Coordinates: 38°40′18″N 45°24′09″E
- Country: Iran
- Province: East Azerbaijan
- County: Marand
- District: Yamchi
- Rural District: Yekanat

Population (2016)
  - Total: 1,694
- Time zone: UTC+3:30 (IRST)

Yekan-e Kahriz (Persian: يكان كهريز) (Note: Also romanized as Yekān-e Kahrīz; also known as Ashaga Yechan, Echan Ashāghi, Eshan Pā’īn, Kahrīz Yekān, Yekān Kahrīz, Yekān Kahrīz Pā’īn, Yekān Kahrīz-e Pā’īn, and Yekān-e Kahrīz-e Soflá,) is a village in, and the capital of, Yekanat Rural District in Yamchi District of Marand County, East Azerbaijan province, Iran.

== Demographics ==
=== Population ===
At the time of the 2006 National Census, the village's population was 2,118 in 526 households. The following census in 2011 counted 1,926 people in 575 households. The 2016 census measured the population of the village as 1,694 people in 530 households. It was the most populous village in its rural district.
