= KY Ahamed =

Indian motorcycle rider

- Nationality: Indian
- Born: 2 June 1996 (age 30); Chennai, India
- Current team: Petronas Mie VisionTrack Racing Team
Motorcycle racing career statistics
Moto3 World Championship
Active years	2023–
Manufacturers	Honda (2023
2023 championship position	NC (0 pts)
Starts / Wins / Podiums / Poles / F. laps / Points; 0 / 0 / 0 / 0 / 0 / 0

Kadai Yaseen Ahamed (born 2 June 1996 in Chennai, India) is a professional motorcycle road racer and the 2021 Indian national champion in the Pro-Stock 301 to 400cc class. He rides for Petronas TVS Racing team. He became the first Indian rider to take part in Moto3 on 24 September 2023 as a wild card entry.

== Early life ==
Ahamed did his schooling at the Hindu High School in Chennai. He was spotted racing on the roads at Triplicane by Jagan Kumar, multiple Indian champion and he introduced him to track racing in 2012. Initially, his family was reluctant to allow him go racing but Jagan convinced them about the safety of racing on the closed circuits.

== Moto3 debut ==
Ahamed made his debut in the Moto3 class at the Grand Prix of India when MotoGP held its inaugural race in India at the Buddh International Circuit, Greater Noida, near New Delhi from September 22 to 24. The Indian got a wildcard to race for the Petronas MIE Racing Vision Track Racing team in the Moto3 category and he was astride a Honda NSF250R. However, another Chennai rider S Sarath Kumar took part in the 125cc World Championship in 2011 for the WTR Ten10 Racing Team. Ahamed took part in the qualifying session but failed to set a qualifying time enough to line up for the main race on Sunday.

Ahamed and Rajiv Sethu were nominated for the trials in Japan by Indian federation FMSCI. After a one week camp under former Moto2 rider Tetsuta Nagashima, Ahamed was selected. He is now preparing for the MotoGP weekend under the guidance of Indonesian Doni Tata Pradita at Yogyakarta.

== Motorsports career ==
Ahamed currently competes in the MMSC FMSCI Indian National Motorcycle Racing Championship in the Supersport Indian165cc and the Pro-Stock 301 to 400cc classes. He won the 125cc Novice title in the 2013 and became the National champion in the Pro-Stock 301 to 400cc class in 2020.

In 2020, Ahamed was also selected to represent TVS Racing for a full season in the Asian Road Racing Championship.

== Career statistics ==
=== Grand Prix motorcycle racing ===
==== By season ====
Season	Class	Motorcycle	Team	Race	Win	Podium	Pole	FLap	Pts	Plcd
2023	Moto3	Honda	Petronas Mie VisionTrack Racing Team	0	0	0	0	0	0	NC
Total				**0**	**0**	**0**	**0**	**0**	**0**	

==== By class ====
Class	Seasons	1st GP	Race	Win	Podiums	Pole	FLap	Pts	WChmp
Moto3	2023	2023 Indian	0	0	0	0	0	0	0
Total	2023		**0**	**0**	**0**	**0**	**0**	**0**	**0**

==== Races by year ====
(key) (Races in bold indicate pole position; races in italics indicate fastest lap)

Year	Class	Bike	1	2	3	4	5	6	7	8	9	10	11	12	13	14	15	16	17	18	19	20	Pos	Pts
2023	Moto3	Honda	POR	ARG	AME	SPA	FRA	ITA	GER	NED	GBR	AUT	CAT	RSM	IND; DNQ	JPN	INA	AUS	THA	MAL	QAT	VAL	NC	0

=== TVS Asia One Make Championship ===
==== Races by year ====
(key) (Races in bold indicate pole position, races in italics indicate fastest lap)

Year	Bike	1		2		3		4		5		6		Pos	Pts
Year	Bike	R1	R2	R1	R2	R1	R2	R1	R2	R1	R2	R1	R2	Pos	Pts
2024	TVS Apache RR310	CHA; 12	CHA; 9	ZHU; Ret	ZHU; C	MOT; 12	MOT; Ret	MAN; 12	MAN; 10	SEP; Ret	SEP; 7	CHA; 10	CHA; 11	12th	45
2025	TVS Apache RR310	CHA; 12	CHA; Ret	SEP; 12	SEP; DNS	MOT	MOT	MAN	MAN	SEP	SEP	CHA; 11	CHA; 9	16th	20
2026	TVS	SEP; Ret	SEP; 9	CHA	CHA	MOT; 12	MOT; 13	MAN	MAN	SEP	SEP	CHA	CHA	16th*	14*
