= Yaghan =

Yaghan, Yagán or Yahgan may refer to:

- Yahgan people, an ethnic group of Argentina and Chile
- Yahgan language, their language
- Yaghan (dog), an extinct domesticated fox

== See also ==
- Yagan (disambiguation)
- Yagha, a province of Burkina Faso
- Yakan (disambiguation)
