= Yengejeh-ye Daliganlu =

Yengejeh-ye Daliganlu ینگجه دلیگانلو
- Village
- Location within Iran
- Coordinates: 37°49′54″N 48°05′16″E
- Country: Iran
- Province: East Azerbaijan
- County: Meyaneh
- Bakhsh: Kandovan
- Rural District: Garmeh-ye Shomali

Population (2006)
  - Total: 374
- Time zone: UTC+3:30 (IRST)
  - Summer (DST): UTC+4:30 (IRDT)

Yengejeh-ye Daliganlu (Persian: ینگجه دلیگانلو, also Romanized as Yengejeh-ye Dalīgānlū; also known as Qeshlāq-e Yengejeh, Yengejeh-ye Dalīkānlū, and Yengejeh-ye Qeshlāq) is a village in Garmeh-ye Shomali Rural District, Kandovan District, Meyaneh County, East Azerbaijan Province, Iran. At the 2006 census, its population was 374, in 73 families.
