= Gulzar, Dera Bugti =

Gulzar
- Location within Pakistan
- Coordinates: 30.31°N 69.1°E
- Country: Pakistan
- Province: Balochistan
- Elevation: 1,292 m (4,239 ft)
- Time zone: UTC+5 (PST)

Gulzar is a town and union council of Dera Bugti District in the Balochistan province of Pakistan. It is located at 30°31'30N 69°1'50E and has an altitude of 1292 metres (4242 feet).
