= Gulzar Bhulkani =

- Location within Pakistan
- Coordinates: 28.13°N 69.3°E
- Country: Pakistan
- Province: Balochistan
- Elevation: 73 m (240 ft)
- Time zone: UTC+5 (PST)

Gulzar Bhulkani is Union council of Jacobabad District in the Balochistan province of Pakistan. It is located at 28°13'40N 69°3'40E to the east of the district capital Jacobabad with an altitude of 73 metres (242 feet).
