= Gulzar, Punjab =

Gulzar
- Location within Pakistan
- Coordinates: 32.26°N 73.21°E
- Country: Pakistan
- Province: Punjab
- Elevation: 201 m (659 ft)
- Time zone: UTC+5 (PST)

Gulzar is a village of Mandi Bahauddin District in the Punjab province of Pakistan. It is located at 32°26'30N 73°21'5E lying to the south-east of the district capital Mandi Bahauddin - with an altitude of 201 metres (662 feet).
