= Kuh Zar, Semnan =

Village in Semnan province, Iran

Kuh Zar Persian: كوه زر
- Village
- Location within Iran
- Coordinates: 35°26′47″N 54°35′23″E
- Country: Iran
- Province: Semnan
- County: Damghan
- District: Amirabad
- Rural District: Qohab-e Rastaq

Population (2016)
  - Total: 709
- Time zone: UTC+3:30 (IRST)

Kuh Zar (Persian: كوه زر) (Note: Also romanized as Kūh Zar) is a village in Qohab-e Rastaq Rural District of Amirabad District in Damghan County, Semnan province, Iran.

== Demographics ==
=== Population ===
At the time of the 2006 National Census, the village's population was 494 in 115 households. The following census in 2011 counted 722 people in 175 households. The 2016 census measured the population of the village as 709 people in 185 households.
