= Yengejeh-ye Sadat =

Yengejeh-ye Sadat ينگجه سادات
- Village
- Location within Iran
- Coordinates: 38°41′57″N 45°31′19″E
- Country: Iran
- Province: East Azerbaijan
- County: Marand
- Bakhsh: Central
- Rural District: Harzandat-e Gharbi

Population (2006)
  - Total: 26
- Time zone: UTC+3:30 (IRST)
  - Summer (DST): UTC+4:30 (IRDT)

Yengejeh-ye Sadat (Persian: ينگجه سادات, also Romanized as Yengejeh-ye Şādāt, Yengejeh-ye Sādāt, and Yengjeh Sādāt) is a village in Harzandat-e Gharbi Rural District, in the Central District of Marand County, East Azerbaijan Province, Iran. At the 2006 census, its population was 26, in 10 families.
