= Golzar-e Yagan =

Golzar-e Yagan گلزاريگن
- Village
- Location within Iran
- Coordinates: 31°14′12″N 61°44′43″E
- Country: Iran
- Province: Sistan and Baluchestan
- County: Hirmand
- Bakhsh: Qorqori
- Rural District: Qorqori

Population (2006)
  - Total: 156
- Time zone: UTC+3:30 (IRST)
  - Summer (DST): UTC+4:30 (IRDT)

Golzar-e Yagan (Persian: گلزاريگن, also Romanized as Golzār-e Yagan; also known as Golzār) is a village in Qorqori Rural District, Qorqori District, Hirmand County, Sistan and Baluchestan Province, Iran. At the 2006 census, its population was 156, in 28 families.
