= Golzar, Hormozgan =

Golzar گلزار
- Village
- Location within Iran
- Coordinates: 28°22′04″N 55°55′55″E
- Country: Iran
- Province: Hormozgan
- County: Hajjiabad
- Bakhsh: Central
- Rural District: Dar Agah

Population (2006)
  - Total: 67
- Time zone: UTC+3:30 (IRST)
  - Summer (DST): UTC+4:30 (IRDT)

Golzar (Persian: گلزار, also Romanized as Golzār) is a village in Dar Agah Rural District, in the Central District of Hajjiabad County, Hormozgan Province, Iran. At the 2006 census, its population was 67, in 9 families.
