= Golzar, East Azerbaijan =

Golzar گلزار
- Village
- Location within Iran
- Coordinates: 38°22′56″N 46°22′43″E
- Country: Iran
- Province: East Azerbaijan
- County: Tabriz
- Bakhsh: Central
- Rural District: Esperan

Population (2006)
  - Total: 63
- Time zone: UTC+3:30 (IRST)
  - Summer (DST): UTC+4:30 (IRDT)

Golzar (Persian: گلزار, also Romanized as Golzār) is a village in Esperan Rural District, in the Central District of Tabriz County, East Azerbaijan Province, Iran. At the 2006 census, its population was 63, in 18 families.
