= Gulzar, Kharan =

Gulzar
- Location within Balochistan, Pakistan Location within Pakistan
- Coordinates: 28.1°N 63.26°E
- Country: Pakistan
- Province: Balochistan
- Elevation: 540 m (1,770 ft)
- Time zone: UTC+5 (PST)

Gulzar is Union council of Kharan District in the Balochistan province of Pakistan. It is located at 28°1'0N 63°26'0E with an altitude of 540 metres (1774 feet).
