= Yengejeh Castle =

Castle in Ardabil Province, Iran

- قلعه ینگجه

General information
- Type: Castle
- Location: Ardabil County, Iran

Yengejeh Castle (Persian: قلعه ینگجه) is a historical castle located in Ardabil County in Ardabil Province, The longevity of this fortress dates back to the Seljuk Empire.
