= Golzar-e Olya =

Golzar-e Olya گلزارعليا
- Village
- Location within Iran
- Coordinates: 36°12′42″N 46°39′53″E
- Country: Iran
- Province: Kurdistan
- County: Saqqez
- Bakhsh: Ziviyeh
- Rural District: Emam

Population (2006)
  - Total: 381
- Time zone: UTC+3:30 (IRST)
  - Summer (DST): UTC+4:30 (IRDT)

Golzar-e Olya (Persian: گلزارعليا, also Romanized as Golzār-e ‘Olyā; also known as Qūzlū-ye Bālā) is a village in Emam Rural District, Ziviyeh District, Saqqez County, Kurdistan Province, Iran. At the 2006 census, its population was 381, in 93 families. The village is populated by Kurds.
