= Jagan Kumar =

Indian professional motorcycle racer

- Years active: 2008-present
- Organization: TVS Racing
- Known for: Motorcycle racing

Jagan Kumar (born 21 September 1988) is an Indian professional motorcycle racer who won ten Indian National motorcycle racing championships in the 165cc class. He races for Petronas TVS Racing team. in the fmsci Indian National Motorcycle Racing Championships. In February 2022, he won after taking the third place in the eighth of the nine-race, five round 2021 Championship which was extended to 2022 due to COVID-19.

== Early life ==
Kumar hails from a simple Tamil family in Triplicane, Chennai. His father used to drive an auto-rickshaw for a living. He used to work as a newspaper boy distributing newspapers house to house and as a courier boy to help meet the family needs and support his B.Com. studies. He first went to Madras Motor Sports Club track in 2006 as a fan. The following year, he took up racing and participated in his first race in 2007 and showed enough talent to be picked up by TVS Racing in 2009. He also spotted and mentored KY Ahamad, a fellow rider from Triplicane, in 2012. Ahamad became the second Indian to race in MotoGP after he got a wild card for Moto3 and took part in the Indian Grand Prix.

== Career ==
Kumar was the first Indian to win in Asia Road Racing (Suzuki Asian Challenge). He won second place in the Asian Challenge in the year 2015 and 2016.

Kumar was the Indian National champion in the 165cc class from 2012 to 2021.

Kumar currently competes in Indian National motorcycle racing championship and Asian Road Racing Championship.
