= Aq Kahriz, Markazi =

Aq Kahriz اق كهريز
- Village
- Location within Iran
- Coordinates: 35°06′22″N 49°47′42″E
- Country: Iran
- Province: Markazi
- County: Saveh
- Bakhsh: Nowbaran
- Rural District: Aq Kahriz

Population (2006)
  - Total: 141
- Time zone: UTC+3:30 (IRST)
  - Summer (DST): UTC+4:30 (IRDT)

Aq Kahriz (Persian: اق كهريز, also Romanized as Āq Kahrīz) is a village in Aq Kahriz Rural District, Nowbaran District, Saveh County, Markazi Province, Iran. At the 2006 census, its population was 141, in 45 families.
