= Jagan, West Azerbaijan =

Jagan جگن
- Village
- Location within Iran
- Coordinates: 39°06′14″N 44°42′41″E
- Country: Iran
- Province: West Azerbaijan
- County: Showt
- Bakhsh: Central
- Rural District: Qarah Quyun-e Shomali

Population (2006)
  - Total: 18
- Time zone: UTC+3:30 (IRST)
  - Summer (DST): UTC+4:30 (IRDT)

Jagan (Persian: جگن; also known as Jagan Bebeh Jīk and Jagan Beh Beh Jīk) is a village in Qarah Quyun-e Shomali Rural District, in the Central District of Showt County, West Azerbaijan Province, Iran. At the 2006 census, its population was 18, in 9 families.
