= Yengejeh, Abbas-e Gharbi =

Yengejeh ينگجه
- Village
- Location within Iran
- Coordinates: 37°43′15″N 47°01′09″E
- Country: Iran
- Province: East Azerbaijan
- County: Bostanabad
- Bakhsh: Tekmeh Dash
- Rural District: Abbas-e Gharbi

Population (2006)
  - Total: 347
- Time zone: UTC+3:30 (IRST)
  - Summer (DST): UTC+4:30 (IRDT)

Yengejeh (Persian: ينگجه; also known as Yengeja and Yengejal) is a village in Abbas-e Gharbi Rural District, Tekmeh Dash District, Bostanabad County, East Azerbaijan Province, Iran. At the 2006 census, its population was 347, in 78 families.
