= Gulzar, Mardan =

Gulzar
- Location within Pakistan
- Coordinates: 34.13°N 72.6°E
- Country: Pakistan
- Province: Khyber Pakhtunkhwa
- Elevation: 293 m (961 ft)
- Time zone: UTC+5 (PST)

Gulzar is a village of Mardan District in the Khyber Pakhtunkhwa province of Pakistan. It is located at 34°13'0N 72°6'25E lying to the north-east of the district capital Mardan - with an altitude of 293 metres (964 feet).
