= Gulzar Kalle =

- Location within Pakistan
- Coordinates: 32.59°N 70.41°E
- Country: Pakistan
- Province: Khyber Pakhtunkhwa
- Elevation: 321 m (1,053 ft)
- Time zone: UTC+5 (PST)

Gulzar Kalle, also Gulzar, is a village of Bannu District in the Khyber Pakhtunkhwa province of Pakistan. It is located at 32°59'35N 70°41'49E with an altitude of 321 metres (1056 feet).
