= Harkabud-e Golzar =

Harkabud-e Golzar هركبودگلزار
- Village
- Location within Iran
- Coordinates: 33°42′53″N 46°21′09″E
- Country: Iran
- Province: Ilam
- County: Ilam
- Bakhsh: Chavar
- Rural District: Arkavazi

Population (2006)
  - Total: 229
- Time zone: UTC+3:30 (IRST)
  - Summer (DST): UTC+4:30 (IRDT)

Harkabud-e Golzar (Persian: هركبودگلزار, also Romanized as Harkabūd-e Golzār; also known as Golzār and Golzār-e Harkabūd) is a village in Arkavazi Rural District, Chavar District, Ilam County, Ilam Province, Iran. At the 2006 census, its population was 229, in 43 families. The village is populated by Kurds.
