= Golah Jar, Kermanshah =

Golah Jar گله جار
- Village
- Location within Iran
- Coordinates: 34°11′08″N 47°20′08″E
- Country: Iran
- Province: Kermanshah
- County: Kermanshah
- Bakhsh: Central
- Rural District: Dorudfaraman

Population (2006)
  - Total: 221
- Time zone: UTC+3:30 (IRST)
  - Summer (DST): UTC+4:30 (IRDT)

Golah Jar (Persian: گله جار, also Romanized as Golah Jār) is a village in Dorudfaraman Rural District, in the Central District of Kermanshah County, Kermanshah Province, Iran. At the 2006 census, its population was 221, in 38 families.
