= Jagan, Jiroft =

Jagan جگان
- Village
- Location within Iran
- Coordinates: 28°36′26″N 57°55′42″E
- Country: Iran
- Province: Kerman
- County: Jiroft
- Bakhsh: Jebalbarez
- Rural District: Rezvan

Population (2006)
  - Total: 55
- Time zone: UTC+3:30 (IRST)
  - Summer (DST): UTC+4:30 (IRDT)

Jagan (Persian: جگان, also Romanized as Jagān) is a village in Rezvan Rural District, Jebalbarez District, Jiroft County, Kerman Province, Iran. At the 2006 census, its population was 55, in 10 families.

Approximate population for 7 km radius from this point: 1,950 people, divided amongst the following villages:

Hishin (0.8 nm)

Mohammadabad-e Hishin (1.9 nm)

Aliabad-e Hishin (2.2 nm)

Kalu Kandeh (2.5 nm)

Garmeshk (2.6 nm)

Patomha Mijan (3.4 nm)

Ab Bad (3.6 nm)

Sar Galu'iyeh (3.9 nm)

Kangu'iyeh (4.2 nm)

Pa Qal`eh (4.2 nm)

Sar Asiab (4.4 nm)

Koldan (5.0 nm)

Nadu'iyeh-ye Sofla (2.3 nm)

Kur Ow'iyeh (2.5 nm)

Nadu'iyeh-ye `Olya (3.1 nm)

Mehr Sabz (3.4 nm)

Sang Andaz (4.2 nm)

Posht Marz-e `Aliabad (4.4 nm)

Shahrak-e Azadegan (4.8 nm)
