= Yengejeh-ye Reza Beyglu =

Village in Ardabil province, Iran

Yengejeh-ye Reza Beyglu Persian: ينگجه رضابيگلو
- Village
- Location within Iran
- Coordinates: 38°16′17″N 48°06′03″E
- Country: Iran
- Province: Ardabil
- County: Ardabil
- District: Central
- Rural District: Sardabeh

Population (2016)
  - Total: 379
- Time zone: UTC+3:30 (IRST)

Yengejeh-ye Reza Beyglu (Persian: ينگجه رضابيگلو) (Note: Also romanized as Yengejeh-ye Reẕā Beyglū; also known as Yengejeh) is a village in Sardabeh Rural District of the Central District in Ardabil County, Ardabil province, Iran.

== Demographics ==
=== Population ===
At the time of the 2006 National Census, the village's population was 403 in 85 households. The following census in 2011 counted 365 people in 94 households. The 2016 census measured the population of the village as 379 people in 107 households.
