= Markid, Marand =

Village in East Azerbaijan province, Iran

Markid Persian: مركيد
- Village
- Location within Iran
- Coordinates: 38°29′55″N 45°37′29″E
- Country: Iran
- Province: East Azerbaijan
- County: Marand
- District: Yamchi
- Rural District: Zu ol Bin

Population (2016)
  - Total: 3,104
- Time zone: UTC+3:30 (IRST)

Markid (Persian: مركيد) (Note: Also romanized as Markīd; also known as Marchit, Margīd, Margīeh, Margīt, Markīt, and Morkīt) is a village in Zu ol Bin Rural District of Yamchi District in Marand County, East Azerbaijan province, Iran.

== Etymology ==
According to Vladimir Minorsky, the name "Margid" is derived from the historical Mongol tribe of Merkit.

== Demographics ==
=== Population ===
At the time of the 2006 National Census, the village's population was 2,735 in 701 households. The following census in 2011 counted 2,987 people in 888 households. The 2016 census measured the population of the village as 3,104 people in 954 households. It was the most populous village in its rural district.
