= Yengejah, Ujan-e Sharqi =

Yengejah ینگجه
- Village
- Location within Iran
- Coordinates: 37°48′55″N 46°53′43″E
- Country: Iran
- Province: East Azerbaijan
- County: Bostanabad
- Bakhsh: Tekmeh Dash
- Rural District: Ujan-e Sharqi

Population (2006)
  - Total: 96
- Time zone: UTC+3:30 (IRST)
  - Summer (DST): UTC+4:30 (IRDT)

Yengejah (Persian: ینگجه) is a village in Ujan-e Sharqi Rural District, Tekmeh Dash District, Bostanabad County, East Azerbaijan Province, Iran. At the 2006 census, its population was 96, in 28 families.
