= Yagan (poetic form) =

Form of Burmese satirical poem

Yagan (Burmese: ရကန်; pronounced [jəgàɰ̃]) is a form of Burmese satirical poem.

Yagan glorifies and praises its subject highly by extremely kicking (satirising or criticising) any other things. Yagan without its characteristics can be called yadu.

Sholaik Yadu and Thagyin have the same general trend of yagan.

== Format ==
Four to six syllables in a line is allowed. Composition-style is flexible. It mostly uses the way of composition in which its verses cap one another in assonance called "Khwadauk composition" (ခွာထောက်စပ်နည်း).

== Notable composers and works ==
Yagan was first started in the Nyaungyan period, and later developed in the middle Konbaung period.

Among the existing yagans, Mwenon yagan of Shwedaung Nandathu is the oldest one, and Yama yagan of U Toe is the finest and the most popular one.

Extraction of Yama yagan is prescribed to the 11th graders, and the original text is prescribed to Myanmar literature university students.

Other famous yagans are:

1. Wasosin yagan (ဝါဆိုစဉ် ရကန်)
2. Ngwedaung yagan (ငွေတောင် ရကန်)
3. Avamyobwe yagan (အဝမြို့ဘွဲ့ ရကန်)
4. Leseni yagan (လေဆေးနည်း ရကန်)
5. Mettapo yagan (မေတ္တာပို့ ရကန်)
6. Aunggyin Shipa yagan (အောင်ခြင်းရှစ်ပါး ရကန်)
7. Pancapapi yagan (ပဉ္စပါပီ ရကန်)
8. Nemi yagan (နေမိ ရကန်)
9. Atthalet Hawgain yagan (အဋ္ဌလက်ဟောကိန်း ရကန်)
10. NagahleHawgain yagan (နဂါးလှည့်ဟောကိန်း ရကန်)
11. Myegan Hawgain yagan (မြေခံဟောကိန်း ရကန်)
12. Thitlekyan yagan (သစ်လဲကြန် ရကန်).

== See also ==
- Burmese literature
