= Golzar-e Haddad =

Golzar-e Haddad گلزارحداد
- Village
- Location within Iran
- Coordinates: 33°42′59″N 46°20′48″E
- Country: Iran
- Province: Ilam
- County: Ilam
- Bakhsh: Chavar
- Rural District: Arkavazi

Population (2006)
  - Total: 123
- Time zone: UTC+3:30 (IRST)
  - Summer (DST): UTC+4:30 (IRDT)

Golzar-e Haddad (Persian: گلزارحداد, also Romanized as Golzār-e Ḩaddād) is a village in Arkavazi Rural District, Chavar District, Ilam County, Ilam Province, Iran. At the 2006 census, its population was 123, in 22 families. The village is populated by Kurds.
