= Qush Qayehsi, Maragheh =

Qush Qayehsi قوش قيه سي
- Village
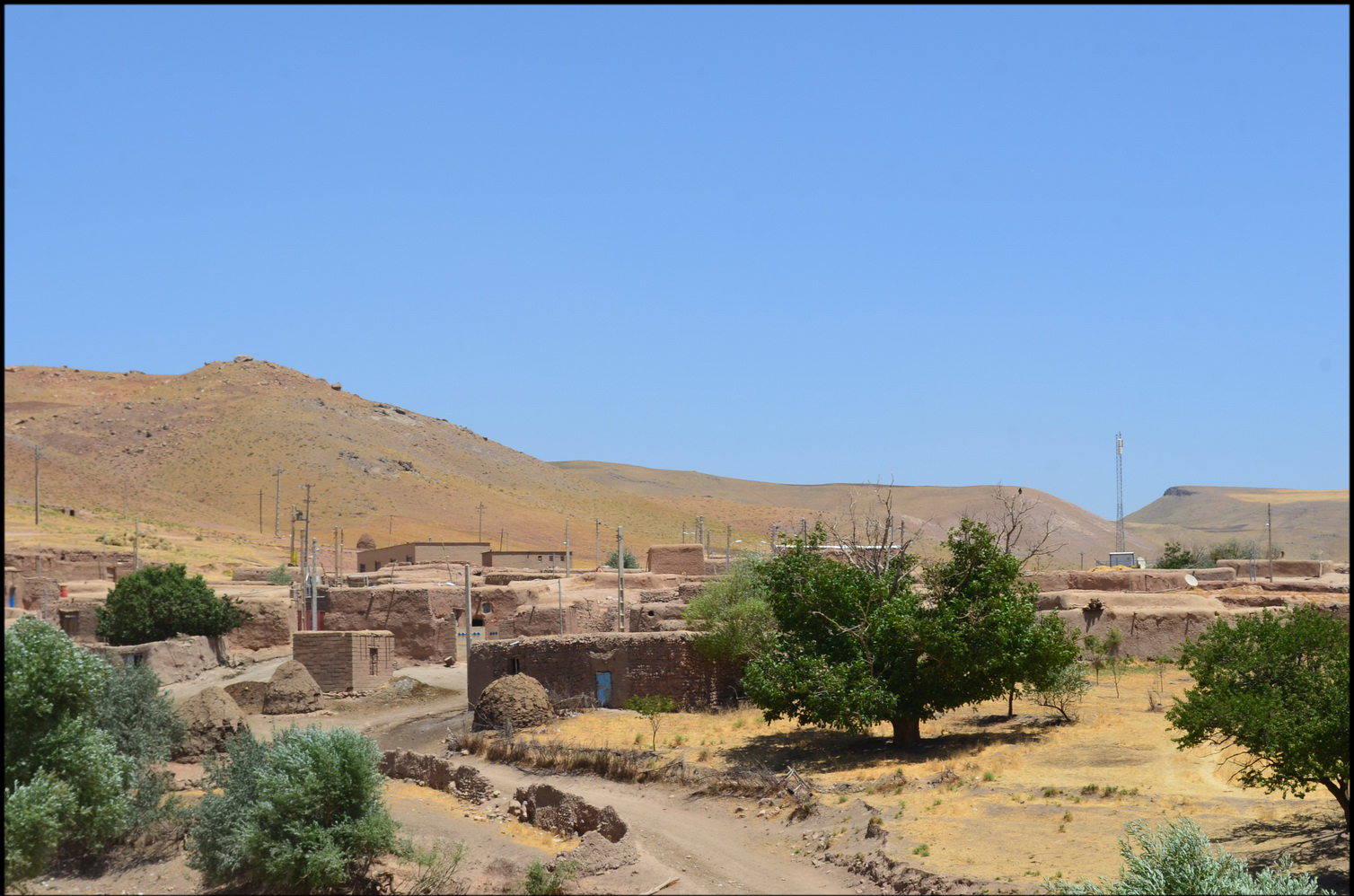

- Location within Iran
- Coordinates: 37°07′37″N 46°29′22″E
- Country: Iran
- Province: East Azerbaijan
- County: Maragheh
- Bakhsh: Saraju
- Rural District: Quri Chay-ye Gharbi

Population (2006)
  - Total: 137
- Time zone: UTC+3:30 (IRST)
  - Summer (DST): UTC+4:30 (IRDT)

Qush Qayehsi (Persian: قوش قيه سي, also Romanized as Qūsh Qayehsī; also known as Qūsh Tappehsī) is a village in Quri Chay-ye Gharbi Rural District, Saraju District, Maragheh County, East Azerbaijan Province, Iran. At the 2006 census, its population was 137, in 27 families.
