= Jagan, Qaleh Ganj =

Jagan جگان
- Village
- Location within Iran
- Coordinates: 26°38′00″N 58°56′00″E
- Country: Iran
- Province: Kerman
- County: Qaleh Ganj
- Bakhsh: Chah Dadkhoda
- Rural District: Rameshk

Population (2006)
  - Total: 35
- Time zone: UTC+3:30 (IRST)
  - Summer (DST): UTC+4:30 (IRDT)

Jagan (Persian: جگان, also Romanized as Jagān) is a village in Rameshk Rural District, Chah Dadkhoda District, Qaleh Ganj County, Kerman Province, Iran. At the 2006 census, the village had a population of 35, residing in 7 families.
