= Gulzar Khanwala =

- Location within Pakistan
- Coordinates: 30.36°N 70.42°E
- Country: Pakistan
- Province: Punjab
- Elevation: 145 m (476 ft)
- Time zone: UTC+5 (PST)

Gulzar Khanwala is a village of Dera Ghazi Khan District in the Punjab province of Pakistan. It is located at 30°36'25N 70°42'10E lying to the north of the district capital Dera Ghazi Khan - with an altitude of 145 metres (476 ft).
