= Markid, Heris =

Markid مركيد
- Village
- Location within Iran
- Coordinates: 38°10′08″N 46°49′28″E
- Country: Iran
- Province: East Azerbaijan
- County: Heris
- Bakhsh: Khvajeh
- Rural District: Bedevostan-e Gharbi

Population (2006)
  - Total: 614
- Time zone: UTC+3:30 (IRST)
  - Summer (DST): UTC+4:30 (IRDT)

Markid (Persian: مركيد, also Romanized as Markīd; also known as Margīd and Markit) is a village in Bedevostan-e Gharbi Rural District, Khvajeh District, Heris County, East Azerbaijan Province, Iran. At the 2006 census, its population was 614, in 132 families.

== Name ==
According to Vladimir Minorsky, the name "Margid" is derived from the historical Mongol tribe of Merkit.
