= Yengejeh-ye Qazi =

Yengejeh-ye Qazi ينگجه قاضي
- Village
- Location within Iran
- Coordinates: 37°33′23″N 45°13′44″E
- Country: Iran
- Province: West Azerbaijan
- County: Urmia
- Bakhsh: Central
- Rural District: Bakeshluchay

Population (2006)
  - Total: 112
- Time zone: UTC+3:30 (IRST)
  - Summer (DST): UTC+4:30 (IRDT)

Yengejeh-ye Qazi (Persian: ينگجه قاضي, also Romanized as Yengejeh-ye Qāẕī; also known as Yengejeh) is a village in Bakeshluchay Rural District, in the Central District of Urmia County, West Azerbaijan Province, Iran. At the 2006 census, its population was 112, in 41 families.
