= Yengejeh, Maragheh =

Village in East Azerbaijan province, Iran

Yengejeh Persian: ینگجه
- Village
- Location within Iran
- Coordinates: 37°27′39″N 46°25′31″E
- Country: Iran
- Province: East Azerbaijan
- County: Maragheh
- District: Central
- Rural District: Sarajuy-ye Shomali

Population (2016)
  - Total: 1,758
- Time zone: UTC+3:30 (IRST)

Yengejeh (Persian: ینگجه) (Note: Also romanized as Yengejh; also known as Yengījeh) is a village in Sarajuy-ye Shomali Rural District of the Central District in Maragheh County, East Azerbaijan province, Iran.

== Demographics ==
=== Population ===
At the time of the 2006 National Census, the village's population was 1,460 in 350 households. The following census in 2011 counted 1,356 people in 491 households. The 2016 census measured the population of the village as 1,758 people in 511 households.
