= Yengejeh, Hamadan =

Village in Hamadan province, Iran

Yengejeh Persian: ينگجه
- Village
- Location within Iran
- Coordinates: 35°10′57″N 49°13′08″E
- Country: Iran
- Province: Hamadan
- County: Famenin
- District: Pish Khowr
- Rural District: Pish Khowr

Population (2016)
  - Total: 577
- Time zone: UTC+3:30 (IRST)

Yengejeh (Persian: ينگجه) (Note: Also romanized as Yangjeh; also known as Yengejeh Pishkhar, Yengejeh-ye Pīsh Khowr, and Yengījeh) is a village in Pish Khowr Rural District of Pish Khowr District in Famenin County, Hamadan province, Iran.

== Demographics ==
=== Population ===
At the time of the 2006 National Census, the village's population was 546 in 160 households, when it was in the former Famenin District of Hamadan County. The following census in 2011 counted 661 people in 182 households, by which time the district had been separated from the county in the establishment of Famenin County. The rural district was transferred to the new Pish Khowr District. The 2016 census measured the population of the village as 577 people in 180 households, the most populous in its rural district.
