= Golzar, Kandahar =

Village in Kandahar Province, Afghanistan

Golzar Gulzar
- Location in Afghanistan
- Coordinates: 31°55′8″N 66°10′35″E
- Country: Afghanistan
- Province: Kandahar Province
- Time zone: UTC+4:30

Golzar (Pashto: ګلزار) (also Gulzar) is a village in Kandahar Province, Afghanistan. It is located at 31.9189°N 66.1764°E.

== See also ==
- Kandahar Province
