= Yengijeh, West Azerbaijan =

Village in West Azerbaijan province, Iran

Yengijeh Persian: ینگیجه
- Village
- Location within Iran
- Coordinates: 36°29′07″N 46°14′11″E
- Country: Iran
- Province: West Azerbaijan
- County: Bukan
- District: Central
- Rural District: Behi-ye Feyzolah Beygi

Population (2016)
  - Total: 1,689
- Time zone: UTC+3:30 (IRST)

Yengijeh (Persian: ینگیجه) (Note: Also romanized as Yengījeh; also known as Yengejeh) is a village in Behi-ye Feyzolah Beygi Rural District of the Central District in Bukan County, West Azerbaijan province, Iran.

== Demographics ==
=== Population ===
At the time of the 2006 National Census, the village's population was 444 in 73 households. The following census in 2011 counted 1,057 people in 270 households. The 2016 census measured the population of the village as 1,689 people in 478 households. It was the most populous village in its rural district.
