= Kuh Zar, Khuzestan =

Kuh Zar كوه زر
- Village
- Location within Iran
- Coordinates: 32°04′00″N 49°02′00″E
- Country: Iran
- Province: Khuzestan
- County: Shushtar
- Bakhsh: Central
- Rural District: Shahid Modarres

Population (2006)
  - Total: 71
- Time zone: UTC+3:30 (IRST)
  - Summer (DST): UTC+4:30 (IRDT)

Kuh Zar (Persian: كوه زر, also Romanized as Kūh Zar; also known as Golzār, Gulzār, and Kūzar) is a village in Shahid Modarres Rural District, in the Central District of Shushtar County, Khuzestan Province, Iran. At the 2006 census, its population was 71, in 16 families.
