= Yengejeh, Razavi Khorasan =

Yengejeh ينگجه
- Village
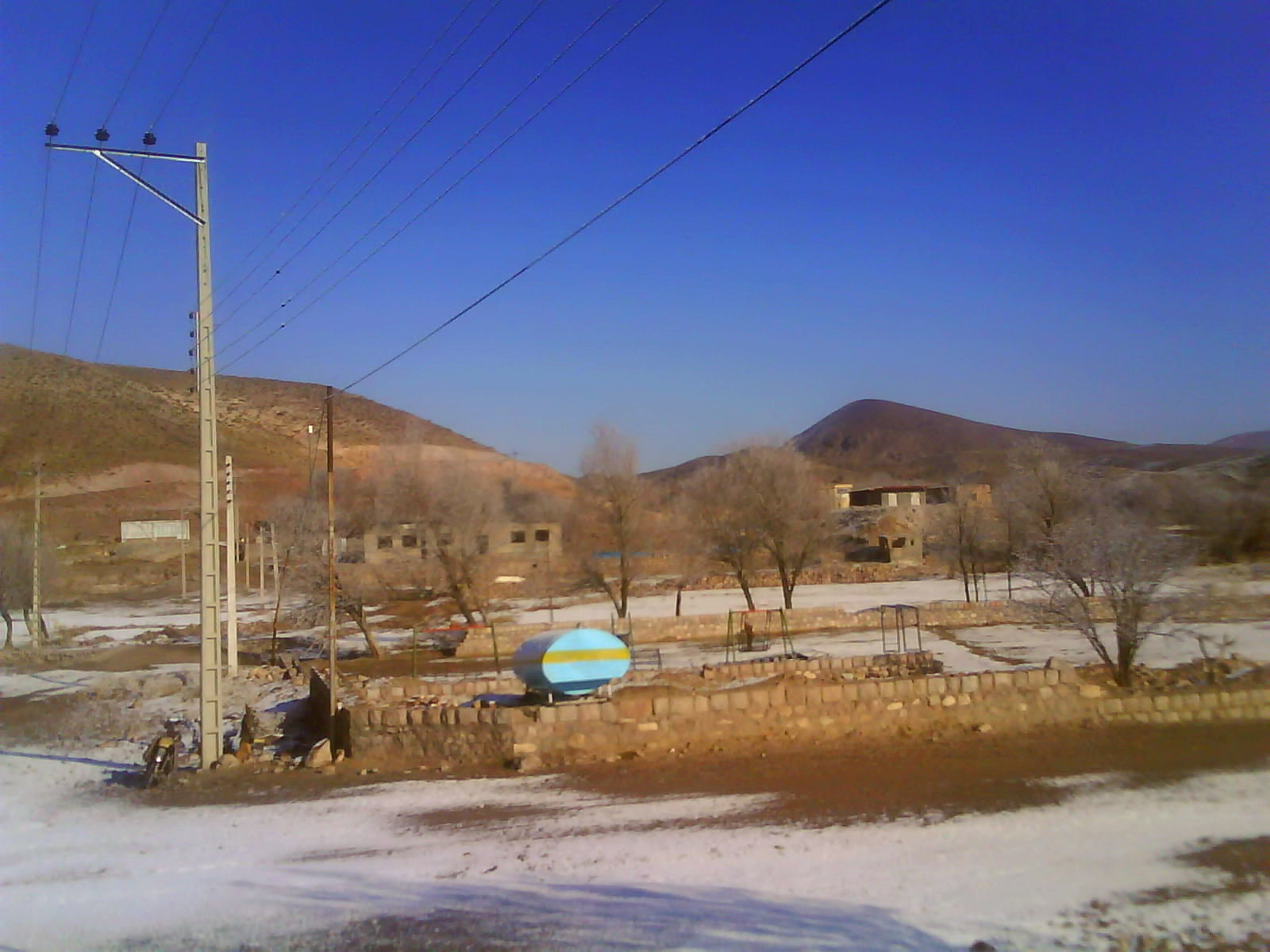
- village view.

- Location within Iran
- Coordinates: 36°49′51″N 58°15′51″E
- Country: Iran
- Province: Razavi Khorasan
- County: Nishapur
- Bakhsh: Sarvelayat
- Rural District: Sarvelayat

Population (2006)
  - Total: 508
- Time zone: UTC+3:30 (IRST)
  - Summer (DST): UTC+4:30 (IRDT)

Yengejeh (Persian: ينگجه; also known as Yengījeh) is a village in Sarvelayat Rural District, Sarvelayat District, Nishapur County, Razavi Khorasan Province, Iran. At the 2006 census, its population was 508, in 174 families.
