= Goleh Jar, Ilam =

Goleh Jar گله جار
- Village
- Location within Iran
- Coordinates: 33°43′04″N 46°20′35″E
- Country: Iran
- Province: Ilam
- County: Ilam
- Bakhsh: Chavar
- Rural District: Arkavazi

Population (2006)
  - Total: 301
- Time zone: UTC+3:30 (IRST)
  - Summer (DST): UTC+4:30 (IRDT)

Goleh Jar (Persian: گله جار, also Romanized as Goleh Jār, Galeh Jār, Geleh Jār; also known as Geleh Chār, Goljār, Gol Jār, Golzār, Gūl-ī-Zār, and Kaljār) is a village in Arkavazi Rural District, Chavar District, Ilam County, Ilam Province, Iran. At the 2006 census, its population was 301, in 61 families. The village is populated by Kurds.
