= Yengejeh, Sumay-ye Beradust =

Village in West Azerbaijan province, Iran

Yengejeh Persian: ينگجه
- Village
- Location within Iran
- Coordinates: 37°56′53″N 44°48′07″E
- Country: Iran
- Province: West Azerbaijan
- County: Urmia
- District: Sumay-ye Beradust
- Rural District: Sumay-ye Shomali

Population (2016)
  - Total: 560
- Time zone: UTC+3:30 (IRST)

Yengejeh (Persian: ينگجه) (Note: Also known as Yangijeh) is a village in Sumay-ye Shomali Rural District of Sumay-ye Beradust District in Urmia County, West Azerbaijan province, Iran.

== Demographics ==
=== Population ===
At the time of the 2006 National Census, the village's population was 474 in 91 households. The following census in 2011 counted 516 people in 115 households. The 2016 census measured the population of the village as 560 people in 126 households.
