= Yangijeh, Kurdistan =

Yangijeh ینگیجه
- Village
- Location within Iran
- Coordinates: 35°34′32″N 46°06′06″E
- Country: Iran
- Province: Kurdistan
- County: Marivan
- Bakhsh: Khav and Mirabad
- Rural District: Khav and Mirabad

Population (2006)
  - Total: 377
- Time zone: UTC+3:30 (IRST)
  - Summer (DST): UTC+4:30 (IRDT)

Yangijeh (Persian: ینگیجه, also Romanized as Yangījeh and Yengījeh; also known as Angcheh, Angicheh, and Yengejeh) is a village in Khav and Mirabad Rural District, Khav and Mirabad District, Marivan County, Kurdistan Province, Iran. At the 2006 census, its population was 377, in 80 families. The village is populated by Kurds.
