= Yengejeh, Shahin Dezh =

Yengejeh ينگجه
- Village
- Location within Iran
- Coordinates: 36°31′55″N 46°36′08″E
- Country: Iran
- Province: West Azerbaijan
- County: Shahin Dezh
- Bakhsh: Central
- Rural District: Hulasu

Population (2006)
  - Total: 327
- Time zone: UTC+3:30 (IRST)
  - Summer (DST): UTC+4:30 (IRDT)

Yengejeh (Persian: ينگجه; also known as Yengījeh) is a village in Hulasu Rural District, in the Central District of Shahin Dezh County, West Azerbaijan Province, Iran. At the 2006 census, its population was 327, in 59 families.
