= Golzar, Kabul =

Golzar Gulzar
- Location in Afghanistan
- Coordinates: 34°23′36″N 69°10′11″E
- Country: Afghanistan
- Province: Kabul Province
- Elevation: 5,650 ft (1,722 m)
- Time zone: UTC+4:30

Golzar (also Gulzar) is a village in Kabul Province, Afghanistan. It is located at 34.3933°N 69.1697°E at 1840m altitude.

== See also ==
- Kabul Province
