= Yengijeh, Zanjan =

Village in Zanjan province, Iran

Yengijeh Persian: ینگیجه
- Village
- Location within Iran
- Coordinates: 36°46′36″N 48°16′36″E
- Country: Iran
- Province: Zanjan
- County: Zanjan
- District: Central
- Rural District: Zanjanrud-e Bala

Population (2016)
  - Total: 967
- Time zone: UTC+3:30 (IRST)

Yengijeh (Persian: ینگیجه) (Note: Also romanized as Yengījeh; also known as Yangija, Yantidzhe, Yengejeh, and Yenkejeh) is a village in Zanjanrud-e Bala Rural District of the Central District in Zanjan County, Zanjan province, Iran.

== Demographics ==
=== Population ===
At the time of the 2006 National Census, the village's population was 1,116 in 259 households. The following census in 2011 counted 1,092 people in 322 households. The 2016 census measured the population of the village as 967 people in 305 households.
