= Zu ol Bin Rural District =

Rural district in East Azerbaijan province, Iran

Zu ol Bin Rural District Persian: دهستان ذوالبين
- Rural District
- Location within Iran
- Coordinates: 38°33′N 45°34′E
- Country: Iran
- Province: East Azerbaijan
- County: Marand
- District: Yamchi
- Established: 1987
- Capital: Yamchi

Population (2016)
  - Total: 14,213
- Time zone: UTC+3:30 (IRST)

Zu ol Bin Rural District (Persian: دهستان ذوالبين) is in Yamchi District of Marand County, East Azerbaijan province, Iran. It is administered from the city of Yamchi.

== Demographics ==
=== Population ===
At the time of the 2006 National Census, the rural district's population was 13,840 in 3,352 households. There were 13,795 inhabitants in 3,955 households at the following census of 2011. The 2016 census measured the population of the rural district as 14,213 in 4,455 households. The most populous of its 19 villages was Markid, with 3,104 people.

=== Other villages in the rural district ===
- Arbatan
- Baruj
- Farfar
- Galehban
- Livar
- Livar-e Pain
- Qamesh Aghol
