= Yekanat Rural District =

Rural district in East Azerbaijan province, Iran

Yekanat Rural District Persian: دهستان يكانات
- Rural District
- Location within Iran
- Coordinates: 38°44′N 45°23′E
- Country: Iran
- Province: East Azerbaijan
- County: Marand
- District: Yamchi
- Established: 1987
- Capital: Yekan-e Kahriz

Population (2016)
  - Total: 3,272
- Time zone: UTC+3:30 (IRST)

Yekanat Rural District (Persian: دهستان يكانات) is in Yamchi District of Marand County, East Azerbaijan province, Iran. Its capital is the village of Yekan-e Kahriz.

== Demographics ==
=== Population ===
At the time of the 2006 National Census, the rural district's population was 4,308 in 1,075 households. There were 3,882 inhabitants in 1,137 households at the following census of 2011. The 2016 census measured the population of the rural district as 3,272 in 1,016 households. The most populous of its 17 villages was Yekan-e Kahriz, with 1,694 people.

=== Other villages in the rural district ===
- Amirabad
- Yekan-e Olya
- Yekan-e Sadi
