= Yamchi District =

District in East Azerbaijan province, Iran

Yamchi District Persian: بخش یامچی
- District
- Location within Iran
- Coordinates: 38°40′N 45°29′E
- Country: Iran
- Province: East Azerbaijan
- County: Marand
- Established: 1995
- Capital: Yamchi

Population (2016)
  - Total: 27,877
- Time zone: UTC+3:30 (IRST)

Yamchi District (Persian: بخش یامچی) is in Marand County, East Azerbaijan province, Iran. Its capital is the city of Yamchi.

== Demographics ==
=== Population ===
At the time of the 2006 National Census, the district's population was 27,468 in 6,728 households. The following census in 2011 counted 27,509 people in 8,007 households. The 2016 census measured the population of the district as 27,877 inhabitants in 8,679 households.

=== Administrative divisions ===
Yamchi District Population
Administrative Divisions	2006	2011	2016
Yekanat RD	4,308	3,882	3,272
Zu ol Bin RD	13,840	13,795	14,213
Yamchi (city)	9,320	9,832	10,392
Total	27,468	27,509	27,877
RD = Rural District
