= Maran, Iran =

Maran or Marran (Persian: مران or ماران) in Iran may refer to:

- Maran, Hamadan (ماران - Mārān), a village in Hamadan Province, Iran
- Maran, Isfahan (ماران - Mārān), a village in Isfahan Province, Iran
- Maran, Kerman (ماران - Mārān), a village in Kerman Province, Iran
- Maran, Jiroft (ماران - Mārān), a village in Kerman Province, Iran
- Maran, Kamyaran (ماران - Mārān), a village in Kurdistan Province, Iran
- Maran-e Olya (مران - Marān), a village in Kurdistan Province, Iran
- Maran-e Sofla (مران - Marān), a village in Kurdistan Province, Iran
- Maran, Markazi (مران - Marān), a village in Markazi Province, Iran
- Maran, Mazandaran (مران - Marān), a village in Mazandaran Province, Iran
