= Sorkheh (disambiguation) =

Sorkheh is a city in Semnan Province, Iran.

Sorkheh or Serkheh (Persian: سرخه) may also refer to:

- Sorkheh, Bostanabad, East Azerbaijan Province
- Sorkheh (Sorkheh-ye Saru Khalil), Bostanabad, East Azerbaijan Province
- Sorkheh, Marand, East Azerbaijan Province
- Sorkheh 1, Khuzestan Province
- Sorkheh 2, Khuzestan Province
- Sorkheh County, an administrative subdivision in Semnan Province
- Sorkheh District, a former administrative subdivision in Semnan Province
- Sorkheh Rural District, an administrative subdivision in Khuzestan Province
