= Qareh Baba =

Qareh Baba or Qarah Baba (Persian: قره بابا) may refer to:

- Qareh Baba, Abbas-e Sharqi, Bostanabad County, East Azerbaijan Province
- Qareh Baba, Ujan-e Sharqi, Bostanabad County, East Azerbaijan Province
- Qarah Baba, West Azerbaijan
