= Qaleh-ye Kohneh =

Qaleh-ye Kohneh or Qaleh Kohneh (Persian: قلعه كهنه) may refer to various places in Iran:

- Qaleh Kohneh, Bushehr
- Qaleh-ye Kohneh, Khorrambid, Fars Province
- Qaleh Kohneh, Mamasani, Fars Province
- Qaleh Kohneh, Kermanshah
- Qaleh Kohneh, Kani Shirin, Divandarreh County, Kurdistan Province
- Qaleh Kohneh, Obatu, Divandarreh County, Kurdistan Province
- Qaleh Kohneh, Saqqez, Kurdistan Province

== See also ==
- Kohneh Qaleh
