= Qarah Chay =

Qarah Chay or Qareh Chay (Persian: قره چاي) may refer to various places in Iran:

- Qarah Chay-e Hajji Ali, East Azerbaijan Province
- Qarah Chay-e Naqshi, East Azerbaijan Province
- Qareh Chay, Markazi
- Qareh Chay, Tafresh, Markazi Province
- Qarah Chay, North Khorasan
- Qarah Chay, Razavi Khorasan
- Qareh Chay District, in Markazi Province
- Qareh Chay Rural District, in Markazi Province
