= Kani Kabud =

Kani Kabud (Persian: کانی کبود) may refer to:

- Kani Kabud, Gilan-e Gharb, Kermanshah Province
- Kani Kabud, Kermanshah
- Kani Kabud, Divandarreh, Kurdistan Province
- Kani Kabud-e Maran, Divandarreh County, Kurdistan Province
