= Seyar =

Seyar or Sir (Persian: سير) may refer to:

- Seyar-e Olya (disambiguation)
- Seyar-e Sofla (disambiguation)
- Seyar-e Vosta
