= Chul Bolagh =

Chul Bolagh چول بلاغ
- Village
- Location within Iran
- Coordinates: 35°58′24″N 46°57′25″E
- Country: Iran
- Province: Kurdistan
- County: Divandarreh
- Bakhsh: Karaftu
- Rural District: Zarrineh

Population (2006)
  - Total: 383
- Time zone: UTC+3:30 (IRST)
  - Summer (DST): UTC+4:30 (IRDT)

Chul Bolagh (Persian: چول بلاغ, also Romanized as Chūl Bolāgh; also known as Chel Bolāgh, Chol Bolāgh, Chulāgh, Chūl Bolākh, and Chul Bulāq) is a village in Zarrineh Rural District, Karaftu District, Divandarreh County, Kurdistan Province, Iran. At the 2006 census, its population was 383, in 71 families. The village is populated by Kurds.
