= Gol Qasem =

Gol Qasem گل قاسم
- Village
- Location within Iran
- Coordinates: 37°43′47″N 46°50′36″E
- Country: Iran
- Province: East Azerbaijan
- County: Bostanabad
- Bakhsh: Tekmeh Dash
- Rural District: Ujan-e Sharqi

Population (2006)
  - Total: 82
- Time zone: UTC+3:30 (IRST)
  - Summer (DST): UTC+4:30 (IRDT)

Gol Qasem (Persian: گل قاسم, also Romanized as Gol Qāsem; also known as Gowl Qāsem) is a village in Ujan-e Sharqi Rural District, Tekmeh Dash District, Bostanabad County, East Azerbaijan Province, Iran. At the 2006 census, its population was 82, in 18 families.
