= Pir Soltan =

Pir Soltan پيرسلطان
- Village
- Location within Iran
- Coordinates: 37°45′37″N 47°00′25″E
- Country: Iran
- Province: East Azerbaijan
- County: Bostanabad
- Bakhsh: Tekmeh Dash
- Rural District: Abbas-e Gharbi

Population (2006)
  - Total: 459
- Time zone: UTC+3:30 (IRST)
  - Summer (DST): UTC+4:30 (IRDT)

Pir Soltan (Persian: پيرسلطان, also Romanized as Pīr Solţān) is a village in Abbas-e Gharbi Rural District, Tekmeh Dash District, Bostanabad County, East Azerbaijan Province, Iran. At the 2006 census, its population was 459, in 92 families.
