= Sari Guni =

Sari Guni ساري گوني
- Village
- Location within Iran
- Coordinates: 37°38′28″N 46°35′58″E
- Country: Iran
- Province: East Azerbaijan
- County: Bostanabad
- Bakhsh: Tekmeh Dash
- Rural District: Sahandabad

Population (2006)
  - Total: 50
- Time zone: UTC+3:30 (IRST)
  - Summer (DST): UTC+4:30 (IRDT)

Sari Guni (Persian: ساري گوني, also Romanized as Sarī Gūnī; also known as Sar Gūnī) is a village in Sahandabad Rural District, Tekmeh Dash District, Bostanabad County, East Azerbaijan Province, Iran. At the 2006 census, its population was 50, in 10 families.
