= Jeyran Mangeh =

Jeyran Mangeh جيران منگه
- Village
- Location within Iran
- Coordinates: 36°06′33″N 46°51′29″E
- Country: Iran
- Province: Kurdistan
- County: Divandarreh
- Bakhsh: Karaftu
- Rural District: Zarrineh

Population (2006)
  - Total: 332
- Time zone: UTC+3:30 (IRST)
  - Summer (DST): UTC+4:30 (IRDT)

Jeyran Mangeh (Persian: جيران منگه, also Romanized as Jeyrān Mangeh, and also known as Jeyrān Mīngeh) is a village in Zarrineh Rural District, Karaftu District, Divandarreh County, Kurdistan Province, Iran. At the 2006 census, its population was 332, in 61 families. The village is populated by Kurds.
