= Qezel Ahmad =

Qezel Ahmad قزل احمد
- Village
- Location within Iran
- Coordinates: 37°40′18″N 46°58′02″E
- Country: Iran
- Province: East Azerbaijan
- County: Bostanabad
- Bakhsh: Tekmeh Dash
- Rural District: Abbas-e Gharbi

Population (2006)
  - Total: 302
- Time zone: UTC+3:30 (IRST)
  - Summer (DST): UTC+4:30 (IRDT)

Qezel Ahmad (Persian: قزل احمد, also Romanized as Qezel Aḩmad) is a village in Abbas-e Gharbi Rural District, Tekmeh Dash District, Bostanabad County, East Azerbaijan Province, Iran. At the 2006 census, its population was 302, in 75 families.
