= Mudi, Iran =

Village in Zarrineh Rural District

Mudi مودي
- Village
- Location within Iran
- Coordinates: 36°02′48″N 46°48′49″E
- Country: Iran
- Province: Kurdistan
- County: Divandarreh
- Bakhsh: Karaftu
- Rural District: Zarrineh

Population (2006)
  - Total: 229
- Time zone: UTC+3:30 (IRST)
  - Summer (DST): UTC+4:30 (IRDT)

Mudi (Persian: مودي, also Romanized as Mūdī) is a village in Zarrineh Rural District, Karaftu District, Divandarreh County, Kurdistan Province, Iran. At the 2006 census, its population was 229, in 45 families. The village is populated by Kurds.
