= Sheykh Beyglu =

Sheykh Beyglu شيخ بيگلو
- Village
- Location within Iran
- Coordinates: 37°38′03″N 46°55′03″E
- Country: Iran
- Province: East Azerbaijan
- County: Bostanabad
- Bakhsh: Tekmeh Dash
- Rural District: Abbas-e Gharbi

Population (2006)
  - Total: 316
- Time zone: UTC+3:30 (IRST)
  - Summer (DST): UTC+4:30 (IRDT)

Sheykh Beyglu (Persian: شيخ بيگلو, also Romanized as Sheykh Beyglū; also known as Sheykh Beyg) is a village in Abbas-e Gharbi Rural District, Tekmeh Dash District, Bostanabad County, East Azerbaijan Province, Iran. At the 2006 census, its population was 316, in 59 families.
