= Anbar Ab =

Anbar Ab انبار آب
- Village
- Location within Iran
- Coordinates: 36°07′56″N 46°55′40″E
- Country: Iran
- Province: Kurdistan
- County: Divandarreh
- Bakhsh: Karaftu
- Rural District: Zarrineh

Population (2006)
  - Total: 185
- Time zone: UTC+3:30 (IRST)
  - Summer (DST): UTC+4:30 (IRDT)

Anbar Ab (Persian: انبار آب, also Romanized as Anbār Āb and Anbārāb) is a village in Zarrineh Rural District, Karaftu District, Divandarreh County, Kurdistan Province, Iran. At the 2006 census, its population was 185, in 34 families. The village is populated by Kurds.
