= Kotek =

Kotek may refer to:

- Kotek (surname), a Czech and Polish surname
- Kotek, Kurdistan, a village in Iran
