= Juvarim =

Jovarim جوريم
- Village
- Location within Iran
- Coordinates: 37°40′02″N 46°51′54″E
- Country: Iran
- Province: East Azerbaijan
- County: Bostanabad
- Bakhsh: Tekmeh Dash
- Rural District: Ujan-e Sharqi

Government

Population (2006)
  - Total: 88
- Time zone: UTC+3:30 (IRST)
  - Summer (DST): UTC+4:30 (IRDT)
- Website: jovarim.com

Jovarim (Persian: جوريم, also Romanized as Jūvarīm) is a village in Ujan-e Sharqi Rural District, Tekmeh Dash District, Bostanabad County, East Azerbaijan province, Iran. At the 2006 census, its population was 88, in 18 families.
