= Kani Shirin =

Kani Shirin كاني شيرين
- Village
- Location within Iran
- Coordinates: 36°15′15″N 47°01′28″E
- Country: Iran
- Province: Kurdistan
- County: Divandarreh
- Bakhsh: Karaftu
- Rural District: Kani Shirin

Population (2006)
  - Total: 222
- Time zone: UTC+3:30 (IRST)
  - Summer (DST): UTC+4:30 (IRDT)

Kani Shirin (Persian: كاني شيرين, also Romanized as Kānī Shīrīn) is a village in Kani Shirin Rural District, Karaftu District, Divandarreh County, Kurdistan Province, Iran. At the 2006 census, its population was 222, in 40 families. The village is populated by Kurds.
