= Nowsaleh =

Nowsaleh نوساله
- Village
- Location within Iran
- Coordinates: 37°43′18″N 47°00′44″E
- Country: Iran
- Province: East Azerbaijan
- County: Bostanabad
- Bakhsh: Tekmeh Dash
- Rural District: Abbas-e Gharbi

Population (2006)
  - Total: 216
- Time zone: UTC+3:30 (IRST)
  - Summer (DST): UTC+4:30 (IRDT)

Nowsaleh (Persian: نوساله, also Romanized as Nowsāleh) is a village in Abbas-e Gharbi Rural District, Tekmeh Dash District, Bostanabad County, East Azerbaijan Province, Iran. At the 2006 census, its population was 216, in 43 families.
