= Aliabad-e Karaftu =

Aliabad-e Karaftu علي آباد كرفتو
- Village
- Location within Iran
- Coordinates: 36°16′21″N 46°48′49″E
- Country: Iran
- Province: Kurdistan
- County: Divandarreh
- Bakhsh: Karaftu
- Rural District: Obatu

Population (2006)
  - Total: 385
- Time zone: UTC+3:30 (IRST)
  - Summer (DST): UTC+4:30 (IRDT)

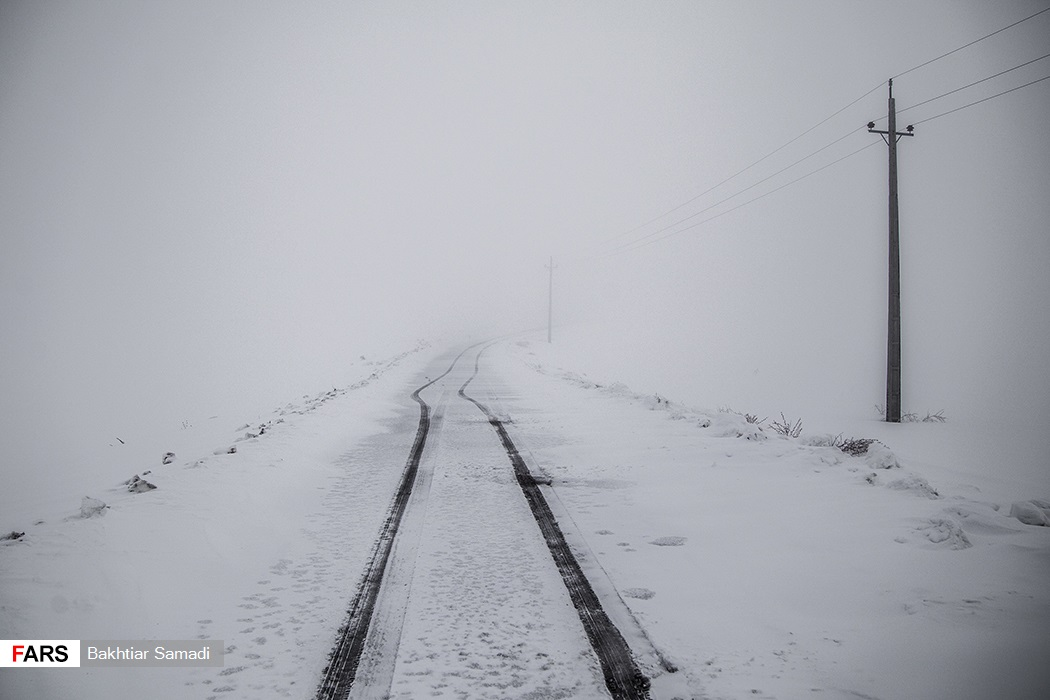

Aliabad-e Karaftu (Persian: علي آباد كرفتو, also Romanized as ‘Alīābād-e Karaftū; also known as ‘Alīābād) is a village in Obatu Rural District, Karaftu District, Divandarreh County, Kurdistan Province, Iran. At the 2006 census, its population was 385, in 90 families. The village is populated by Kurds.
