= Karaftu, Kurdistan =

Karaftu كرفتو
- Village
- Location within Iran
- Coordinates: 36°16′16″N 46°51′14″E
- Country: Iran
- Province: Kurdistan
- County: Divandarreh
- Bakhsh: Karaftu
- Rural District: Obatu

Population (2006)
  - Total: 326
- Time zone: UTC+3:30 (IRST)
  - Summer (DST): UTC+4:30 (IRDT)

Karaftu (Persian: كرفتو, also Romanized as Karaftū) is a village in Obatu Rural District, Karaftu District, Divandarreh County, Kurdistan Province, Iran. At the 2006 census, its population was 326, in 60 families. The village is populated by Kurds.
