= Kas Nazan =

Kas Nazan or Kasnazan (Persian: كس نزان) may refer to the following places in Iran:

- Kas Nazan, Divandarreh
- Kas Nazan, Saqqez
