= Zaki Beyg =

Zaki Beyg (Persian: ذكي بيگ), also rendered as Zaki Beg, may refer to:

- Zaki Beyg-e Olya
- Zaki Beyg-e Sofla
