= Jegher =

Jegher جغر
- Village
- Location within Iran
- Coordinates: 37°38′49″N 46°47′22″E
- Country: Iran
- Province: East Azerbaijan
- County: Bostanabad
- Bakhsh: Tekmeh Dash
- Rural District: Ujan-e Sharqi

Population (2006)
  - Total: 31
- Time zone: UTC+3:30 (IRST)
  - Summer (DST): UTC+4:30 (IRDT)

Jegher (Persian: جغر, also Romanized as Jaghar; also known as Chigir, Chiqur, and Jeghīr) is a village in Ujan-e Sharqi Rural District, Tekmeh Dash District, Bostanabad County, East Azerbaijan Province, Iran. At the 2006 census, its population was 31, in 6 families.
