= Tabaqlu =

Tabaqlu طبقلو
- Village
- Location within Iran
- Coordinates: 37°38′52″N 46°52′49″E
- Country: Iran
- Province: East Azerbaijan
- County: Bostanabad
- Bakhsh: Tekmeh Dash
- Rural District: Abbas-e Gharbi

Population (2006)
  - Total: 68
- Time zone: UTC+3:30 (IRST)
  - Summer (DST): UTC+4:30 (IRDT)

Tabaqlu (Persian: طبقلو, also Romanized as Ţabaqlū) is a village in Abbas-e Gharbi Rural District, Tekmeh Dash District, Bostanabad County, East Azerbaijan Province, Iran. At the 2006 census, its population was 68, in 15 families.
