= Charmkhowran =

Charmkhowran or Charmkhvoran (Persian: چرم خوران); also known as Charmkhvar, may refer to:

- Charmkhowran-e Bala
- Charmkhowran-e Sofla
