= Zaglujeh =

Zaglujeh (Persian: زگلوجه) may refer to:

- Zaglujeh, Abbas-e Sharqi
- Zaglujeh, Ujan-e Sharqi
