= Rahim-e Kuzhiag =

Rahim-e Kuzhiag رحيم كژياگ
- Village
- Location within Iran
- Coordinates: 36°14′29″N 46°49′21″E
- Country: Iran
- Province: Kurdistan
- County: Divandarreh
- Bakhsh: Karaftu
- Rural District: Obatu

Population (2006)
  - Total: 81
- Time zone: UTC+3:30 (IRST)
  - Summer (DST): UTC+4:30 (IRDT)

Rahim-e Kuzhiag (Persian: رحيم كژياگ, also Romanized as Raḩīm-e Kūzhīāg; also known as Raḩīm-e Kūzhīā) is a village in Obatu Rural District, Karaftu District, Divandarreh County, Kurdistan Province, Iran. At the 2006 census, its population was 81, in 16 families. The village is populated by Kurds.
