= Aghcheh Kohal =

Aghcheh Kohal (Persian: اغچه كهل) may refer to:

- Aghcheh Kohal-e Rajabanlu
- Aghcheh Kohal-e Zamani
