= Qachian =

Qachian قاچيان
- Village
- Location within Iran
- Coordinates: 36°04′32″N 46°48′27″E
- Country: Iran
- Province: Kurdistan
- County: Divandarreh
- Bakhsh: Karaftu
- Rural District: Zarrineh

Population (2006)
  - Total: 154
- Time zone: UTC+3:30 (IRST)
  - Summer (DST): UTC+4:30 (IRDT)

Qachian (Persian: قاچيان, also Romanized as Qāchīān) is a village in Zarrineh Rural District, Karaftu District, Divandarreh County, Kurdistan Province, Iran. At the 2006 census, its population was 154, in 31 families. The village is populated by Kurds.
