= Dali Quruqchi =

Dali Quruqchi دلي قوروقچي
- Village
- Location within Iran
- Coordinates: 37°37′40″N 46°38′14″E
- Country: Iran
- Province: East Azerbaijan
- County: Bostanabad
- Bakhsh: Tekmeh Dash
- Rural District: Sahandabad

Population (2006)
  - Total: 116
- Time zone: UTC+3:30 (IRST)
  - Summer (DST): UTC+4:30 (IRDT)

Dali Quruqchi (Persian: دلي قوروقچي, also Romanized as Dalī Qūrūqchī) is a village in Sahandabad Rural District, Tekmeh Dash District, Bostanabad County, East Azerbaijan Province, Iran. At the 2006 census, its population was 116, in 20 families.
