= Soltan Gah =

Soltan Gah سلطانگه
- Village
- Location within Iran
- Coordinates: 37°35′50″N 46°53′53″E
- Country: Iran
- Province: East Azerbaijan
- County: Bostanabad
- Bakhsh: Tekmeh Dash
- Rural District: Abbas-e Gharbi

Population (2006)
  - Total: 407
- Time zone: UTC+3:30 (IRST)
  - Summer (DST): UTC+4:30 (IRDT)

Soltan Gah (Persian: سلطانگه, also Romanized as Solţān Gah and Solţāngah) is a village in Abbas-e Gharbi Rural District, Tekmeh Dash District, Bostanabad County, East Azerbaijan Province, Iran. At the 2006 census, its population was 407, in 77 families.
