= Gumehi =

Gumehi گومه اي
- Village
- Location within Iran
- Coordinates: 36°09′05″N 46°51′12″E
- Country: Iran
- Province: Kurdistan
- County: Divandarreh
- Bakhsh: Karaftu
- Rural District: Zarrineh

Population (2006)
  - Total: 360
- Time zone: UTC+3:30 (IRST)
  - Summer (DST): UTC+4:30 (IRDT)

Gumehi (Persian: گومه اي, also Romanized as Gūmeh’ī) is a village in Zarrineh Rural District, Karaftu District, Divandarreh County, Kurdistan Province, Iran. At the 2006 census, its population was 360, in 66 families. The village is populated by Kurds.
