= Tegerbari =

Tegerbari تگرباري
- Village
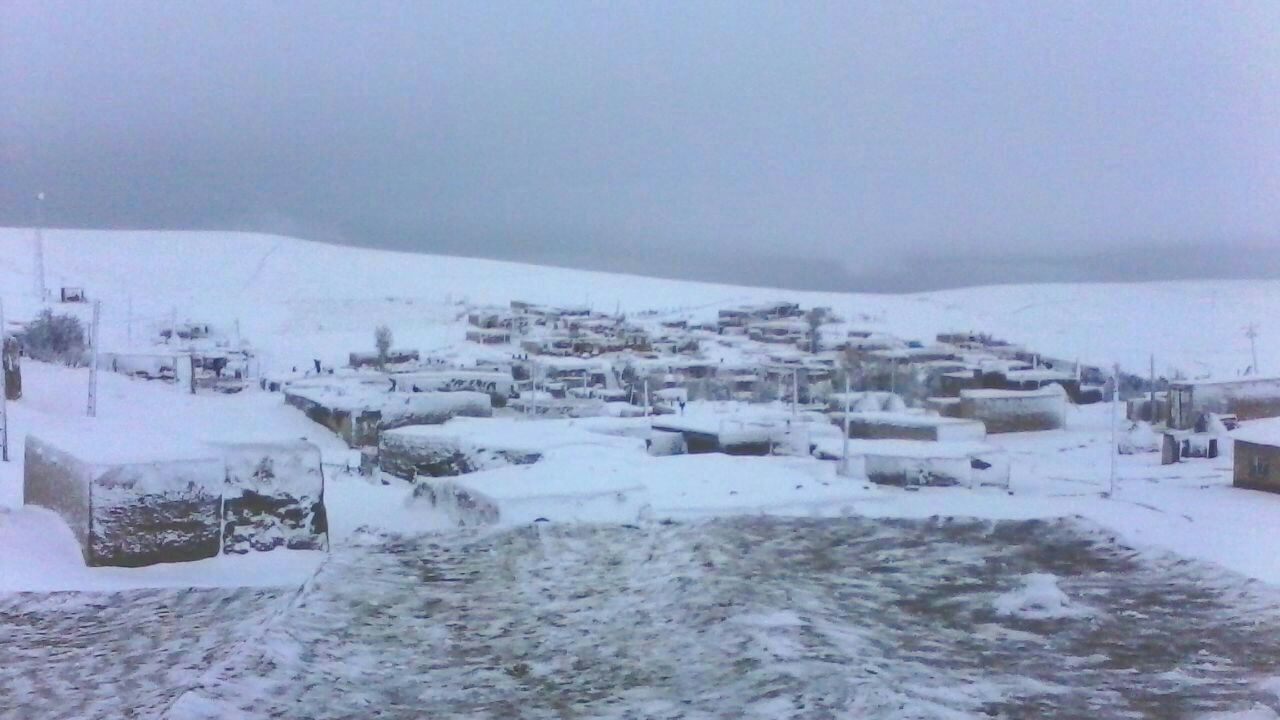

- Location within Iran
- Coordinates: 36°26′05″N 47°06′54″E
- Country: Iran
- Province: Kurdistan
- County: Divandarreh
- Bakhsh: Karaftu
- Rural District: Kani Shirin

Population (2006)
  - Total: 325
- Time zone: UTC+3:30 (IRST)
  - Summer (DST): UTC+4:30 (IRDT)

Tegerbari (Persian: تگرباري, also Romanized as Tegerbārī and Tagarbārī) is a village in Kani Shirin Rural District, Karaftu District, Divandarreh County, Kurdistan Province, Iran. At the 2006 census, its population was 325, in 62 families. The village is populated by Kurds.
