= Khakibeyg =

Khakibeyg خاكي بيگ
- Village
- Location within Iran
- Coordinates: 36°10′50″N 46°54′52″E
- Country: Iran
- Province: Kurdistan
- County: Divandarreh
- Bakhsh: Karaftu
- Rural District: Obatu

Population (2006)
  - Total: 421
- Time zone: UTC+3:30 (IRST)
  - Summer (DST): UTC+4:30 (IRDT)

Khakibeyg (Persian: خاكي بيگ, also Romanized as Khākībeyg) is a village in Obatu Rural District, Karaftu District, Divandarreh County, Kurdistan Province, Iran. At the 2006 census, its population was 421, in 82 families. The village is populated by Kurds.
