= Shirvaneh Deh =

Village in East Azerbaijan province, Iran

Shirvaneh Deh Persian: شيروانه ده
- Village
- Location within Iran
- Coordinates: 37°43′44″N 46°54′27″E
- Country: Iran
- Province: East Azerbaijan
- County: Bostanabad
- District: Tikmeh Dash
- Rural District: Abbas-e Gharbi

Population (2016)
  - Total: 1,573
- Time zone: UTC+3:30 (IRST)

Shirvaneh Deh (Persian: شيروانه ده) (Note: Also romanized as Shīrvāneh Deh) is a village in Abbas-e Gharbi Rural District of Tikmeh Dash District in Bostanabad County, East Azerbaijan province, Iran.

== Demographics ==
=== Population ===
At the time of the 2006 National Census, the village's population was 1,692 in 346 households. The following census in 2011 counted 1,537 people in 418 households. The 2016 census measured the population of the village as 1,573 people in 452 households.
