= Yuzbashi Kandi =

Yuzbashi Kandi يوزباشي كندي
- Village
- Location within Iran
- Coordinates: 36°18′19″N 46°53′49″E
- Country: Iran
- Province: Kurdistan
- County: Divandarreh
- Bakhsh: Karaftu
- Rural District: Obatu

Population (2006)
  - Total: 346
- Time zone: UTC+3:30 (IRST)
  - Summer (DST): UTC+4:30 (IRDT)

Yuzbashi Kandi (Persian: يوزباشي كندي, also Romanized as Yūzbāshī Kandī; also known as Yūzbāsh Kandī) is a village in Obatu Rural District, Karaftu District, Divandarreh County, Kurdistan Province, Iran. At the 2006 census, its population was 346, in 61 families. The village is populated by Kurds.
