= Sir-e Sofla, Kurdistan =

Sir-e Sofla سيرسفلي
- Village
- Location within Iran
- Coordinates: 36°09′06″N 46°59′33″E
- Country: Iran
- Province: Kurdistan
- County: Divandarreh
- Bakhsh: Karaftu
- Rural District: Kani Shirin

Population (2006)
  - Total: 224
- Time zone: UTC+3:30 (IRST)
  - Summer (DST): UTC+4:30 (IRDT)

Sir-e Sofla (Persian: سيرسفلي, also Romanized as Sīr-e Soflá) is a village in Kani Shirin Rural District, Karaftu District, Divandarreh County, Kurdistan Province, Iran. At the 2006 census, its population was 224, in 52 families. The village is populated by Kurds.
