= Bayazidabad =

Bayazidabad or Bayezidabad (Persian: بايزيد آباد) may refer to:

- Bayazidabad, Baneh, Kurdistan Province
- Bayazidabad, Divandarreh, Kurdistan Province
- Bayezidabad, West Azerbaijan
