= Sorkheh, Bostanabad =

Sorkheh بستان ابادسرخه
- Village
- Location within Iran
- Coordinates: 37°45′01″N 47°04′25″E
- Country: Iran
- Province: East Azerbaijan
- County: Bostanabad
- Bakhsh: Tekmeh Dash
- Rural District: Abbas-e Gharbi

Population (2006)
  - Total: 73
- Time zone: UTC+3:30 (IRST)
  - Summer (DST): UTC+4:30 (IRDT)

Sorkheh (Persian: سرخه, also Romanized as Serkheh) is a village in Abbas-e Gharbi Rural District, Tekmeh Dash District, Bostanabad County, East Azerbaijan Province, Iran. At the 2006 census, its population was 73, in 11 families.
