= Zaki Beyg-e Sofla =

Zaki Beyg-e Sofla ذكي بيگ سفلي
- Village
- Location within Iran
- Coordinates: 36°11′07″N 46°57′12″E
- Country: Iran
- Province: Kurdistan
- County: Divandarreh
- Bakhsh: Karaftu
- Rural District: Obatu

Population (2006)
  - Total: 131
- Time zone: UTC+3:30 (IRST)
  - Summer (DST): UTC+4:30 (IRDT)

Zaki Beyg-e Sofla (Persian: ذكي بيگ سفلي, also Romanized as Z̄akī Beyg-e Soflá; also known as Z̄akī Beg-e Soflá) is a village in Obatu Rural District, Karaftu District, Divandarreh County, Kurdistan Province, Iran. At the 2006 census, its population was 131, in 30 families. The village is populated by Kurds.
