= Maran-e Olya =

Maran-e Olya مران عليا
- Village
- Location within Iran
- Coordinates: 36°13′18″N 46°58′13″E
- Country: Iran
- Province: Kurdistan
- County: Divandarreh
- Bakhsh: Karaftu
- Rural District: Obatu

Population (2006)
  - Total: 543
- Time zone: UTC+3:30 (IRST)
  - Summer (DST): UTC+4:30 (IRDT)

Maran-e Olya (Persian: مران عليا, also Romanized as Marān-e ‘Olyā and Marrān-e ‘Olyā; also known as Marān-e Bālā and Marrān) is a village in Obatu Rural District, Karaftu District, Divandarreh County, Kurdistan Province, Iran. At the 2006 census, its population was 543, in 124 families. The village is populated by Kurds.
