= Masoudabad =

Masudabad (Persian: مسعوداباد) may refer to:

- Masudabad, Kurdistan
- Masudabad, Lorestan
- Masudabad, Qazvin
- Masudabad, West Azerbaijan
