= Seyar-e Vosta =

Seyar-e Vosta سيروسطي
- Village
- Location within Iran
- Coordinates: 37°36′21″N 46°42′37″E
- Country: Iran
- Province: East Azerbaijan
- County: Bostanabad
- Bakhsh: Tekmeh Dash
- Rural District: Sahandabad

Population (2006)
  - Total: 223
- Time zone: UTC+3:30 (IRST)
  - Summer (DST): UTC+4:30 (IRDT)

Seyar-e Vosta (Persian: سيروسطي, also Romanized as Seyar-e Vosţá; also known as Seyar-e Vasaţ) is a village in Sahandabad Rural District, Tekmeh Dash District, Bostanabad County, East Azerbaijan Province, Iran. At the 2006 census, its population was 223, in 45 families.
