= Yuzbashi =

Yuzbashi may refer to:

- Yuzbashi Chay, is a village in Kuhgir Rural District, Tarom Sofla District.
- Yuzbashi Kandi, is a village in Obatu Rural District, Karaftu District.
- Tazeh Kand-e Yuzbashi, is a village in Meshgin-e Gharbi Rural District.
- Yuz Bashi
- Yuz Bashi, North Khorasan
- Yuzbash Mahallehsi
