= Sir-e Olya, Kurdistan =

Sir-e Olya سيرعليا
- Village
- Location within Iran
- Coordinates: 36°09′23″N 46°57′49″E
- Country: Iran
- Province: Kurdistan
- County: Divandarreh
- Bakhsh: Karaftu
- Rural District: Kani Shirin

Population (2006)
  - Total: 105
- Time zone: UTC+3:30 (IRST)
  - Summer (DST): UTC+4:30 (IRDT)

Sir-e Olya (Persian: سيرعليا, also Romanized as Sīr-e ‘Olyā) is a village in Kani Shirin Rural District, Karaftu District, Divandarreh County, Kurdistan Province, Iran. At the 2006 census, its population was 105, in 21 families. The village is populated by Kurds.
