= Khalileh Deh =

Village in East Azerbaijan province, Iran

Khalileh Deh Persian: خليله ده
- Village
- Location within Iran
- Coordinates: 37°42′16″N 46°52′22″E
- Country: Iran
- Province: East Azerbaijan
- County: Bostanabad
- District: Tikmeh Dash
- Rural District: Ujan-e Sharqi

Population (2016)
  - Total: 298
- Time zone: UTC+3:30 (IRST)

Khalileh Deh (Persian: خليله ده) (Note: Also romanized as Khalīleh Deh) is a village in Ujan-e Sharqi Rural District of Tikmeh Dash District in Bostanabad County, East Azerbaijan province, Iran.

== Demographics ==
=== Population ===
At the time of the 2006 National Census, the village's population was 385 in 74 households. The following census in 2011 counted 334 people in 78 households. The 2016 census measured the population of the village as 298 people in 83 households.
