= Seyar-e Sofla =

Seyar-e Sofla or Sir-e Sofla (Persian: سيرسفلي) may refer to:

- Seyar-e Sofla, East Azerbaijan
- Sir-e Sofla, Kurdistan
