= Alkhalaj =

Village in East Azerbaijan province, Iran

Alkhalaj Persian: الخلج
- Village
- Location within Iran
- Coordinates: 37°41′42″N 46°58′50″E
- Country: Iran
- Province: East Azerbaijan
- County: Bostanabad
- District: Tikmeh Dash
- Rural District: Abbas-e Gharbi

Population (2016)
  - Total: 1,730
- Time zone: UTC+3:30 (IRST)

Alkhalaj (Persian: الخلج) (Note: Also known as ‘Alī Khalaj) is a village in Abbas-e Gharbi Rural District of Tikmeh Dash District in Bostanabad County, East Azerbaijan province, Iran.

== Demographics ==
=== Population ===
At the time of the 2006 National Census, the village's population was 2,373 in 544 households. The following census in 2011 counted 2,164 people in 586 households. The 2016 census measured the population of the village as 1,730 people in 539 households. It was the most populous village in its rural district.
