= Seyar-e Olya =

Seyar-e Olya or Sir-e Olya (Persian: سيرعليا) may refer to:

- Seyar-e Olya, East Azerbaijan
- Sir-e Olya, Kurdistan
