= Almalu, Bostanabad =

Village in East Azerbaijan province, Iran

Almalu Persian: المالو
- Village
- Location within Iran
- Coordinates: 37°38′58″N 46°38′51″E
- Country: Iran
- Province: East Azerbaijan
- County: Bostanabad
- District: Tikmeh Dash
- Rural District: Sahandabad

Population (2016)
  - Total: 207
- Time zone: UTC+3:30 (IRST)

Almalu (Persian: المالو) (Note: Also romanized as Ālmālū) is a village in Sahandabad Rural District of Tikmeh Dash District in Bostanabad County, East Azerbaijan province, Iran.

== Demographics ==
=== Population ===
At the time of the 2006 National Census, the village's population was 305 in 64 households. The following census in 2011 counted 265 people in 68 households. The 2016 census measured the population of the village as 207 people in 64 households.
