= Qarah Chay-e Naqshi =

Village in East Azerbaijan, Iran

Qarah Chay-e Naqshi قره چاي نقشي
- Village
- Location within Iran
- Coordinates: 37°41′30″N 46°54′29″E
- Country: Iran
- Province: East Azerbaijan
- County: Bostanabad
- Bakhsh: Tekmeh Dash
- Rural District: Abbas-e Gharbi

Population (2006)
  - Total: 88
- Time zone: UTC+3:30 (IRST)
  - Summer (DST): UTC+4:30 (IRDT)

Qarah Chay-e Naqshi (Persian: قره چاي نقشي, also Romanized as Qarah Chāy-e Naqshī; also known as Qarah Chāy-e Naqshīneh) is a village in Abbas-e Gharbi Rural District, Tekmeh Dash District, Bostanabad County, East Azerbaijan Province, Iran. At the 2006 census, its population was 88, in 21 families.
