= Sorkheh (Sorkheh-ye Saru Khalil), Bostanabad =

Sarkheh سرخه
- Village
- Location within Iran
- Coordinates: 37°46′00″N 47°04′00″E
- Country: Iran
- Province: East Azerbaijan
- County: Bostanabad
- District: Tikmeh Dash
- Rural District: Abbas-e Gharbi

Population (2006)
  - Total: 246
- Time zone: UTC+3:30 (IRST)
  - Summer (DST): UTC+4:30 (IRDT)

Sarkheh (Persian: سرخه; also known as Sarkheh-ye Sārū Khalīl and Sārū Khalīl) is a village in Abbas-e Gharbi Rural District, Tekmeh Dash District, Bostanabad County, East Azerbaijan Province, Iran. At the 2006 census, its population was 246, in 41 families.
