= Papaleh =

Village in Kurdistan province, Iran

Papaleh Persian: پاپاله
- Village
- Location within Iran Location within Iran Kurdistan
- Coordinates: 36°09′39″N 47°09′58″E
- Country: Iran
- Province: Kurdistan
- County: Divandarreh
- District: Karaftu
- Rural District: Kani Shirin

Population (2016)
  - Total: 859
- Time zone: UTC+3:30 (IRST)

Papaleh (Persian: پاپاله) (Note: Also romanized as Pāpāleh) is a village in Kani Shirin Rural District of Karaftu District, Divandarreh County, Kurdistan province, Iran.

== Demographics ==
=== Ethnicity ===
The village is populated by Kurds.

=== Population ===
At the time of the 2006 National Census, the village's population was 1,094 in 220 households. The following census in 2011 counted 1,012 people in 228 households. The 2016 census measured the population of the village as 859 people in 216 households. It was the most populous village in its rural district.
