= Zaki Beyg-e Olya =

Zaki Beyg-e Olya ذكي بيگ عليا
- Village
- Location within Iran
- Coordinates: 36°12′28″N 46°55′37″E
- Country: Iran
- Province: Kurdistan
- County: Divandarreh
- Bakhsh: Karaftu
- Rural District: Obatu

Population (2006)
  - Total: 352
- Time zone: UTC+3:30 (IRST)
  - Summer (DST): UTC+4:30 (IRDT)

Zaki Beyg-e Olya (Persian: ذكي بيگ عليا, also Romanized as Z̄akī Beyg-e ‘Olyā; also known as Z̄akī Beg-e ‘Olyā) is a village in Obatu Rural District, Karaftu District, Divandarreh County, Kurdistan Province, Iran. At the 2006 census, its population was 352, in 73 families. The village is populated by Kurds.
