= Qaleh Kohneh, Kani Shirin =

Qaleh Kohneh قلعه كهنه
- Village
- Location within Iran
- Coordinates: 36°08′45″N 47°11′11″E
- Country: Iran
- Province: Kurdistan
- County: Divandarreh
- Bakhsh: Karaftu
- Rural District: Kani Shirin

Population (2006)
  - Total: 550
- Time zone: UTC+3:30 (IRST)
  - Summer (DST): UTC+4:30 (IRDT)

Qaleh Kohneh (Persian: قلعه كهنه, also Romanized as Qal‘eh Kohneh) is a village in Kani Shirin Rural District, Karaftu District, Divandarreh County, Kurdistan Province, Iran. At the 2006 census, its population was 550, in 97 families. The village is populated by Kurds.
