= Aghcheh Kohal-e Zamani =

Aghcheh Kohal-e Zamani اغچه كهل زماني
- Village
- Location within Iran
- Coordinates: 37°40′07″N 46°50′16″E
- Country: Iran
- Province: East Azerbaijan
- County: Bostanabad
- Bakhsh: Tekmeh Dash
- Rural District: Ujan-e Sharqi

Population (2006)
  - Total: 119
- Time zone: UTC+3:30 (IRST)
  - Summer (DST): UTC+4:30 (IRDT)

Aghcheh Kohal-e Zamani (Persian: اغچه كهل زماني, also Romanized as Āghcheh Kohal-e Zamānī; also known as Āghjeh Kohal Zamān) is a village in Ujan-e Sharqi Rural District, Tekmeh Dash District, Bostanabad County, East Azerbaijan Province, Iran. At the 2006 census, its population was 119, in 22 families.
