= Kotek, Kurdistan =

Kotek کتک
- Village
- Location within Iran
- Coordinates: 35°57′24″N 46°56′06″E
- Country: Iran
- Province: Kurdistan
- County: Divandarreh
- Bakhsh: Karaftu
- Rural District: Zarrineh

Population (2006)
  - Total: 317
- Time zone: UTC+3:30 (IRST)
  - Summer (DST): UTC+4:30 (IRDT)

Kotek (Persian: کتک, also Romanized as Katak) is a village in Zarrineh Rural District, Karaftu District, Divandarreh County, Kurdistan Province, Iran. At the 2006 census, its population was 317, in 59 families. The village is populated by Kurds.
