= Eyn ol Din =

Village in East Azerbaijan province, Iran

Eyn ol Din Persian: عين الدين
- Village
- Location within Iran
- Coordinates: 37°47′02″N 46°54′18″E
- Country: Iran
- Province: East Azerbaijan
- County: Bostanabad
- District: Tikmeh Dash
- Rural District: Ujan-e Sharqi

Population (2016)
  - Total: 2,423
- Time zone: UTC+3:30 (IRST)

Eyn ol Din (Persian: عين الدين) (Note: Also romanized as ‘Eyn ol Dīn; also known as ‘Eyn ed Dīn and ‘Eyn od Dīn) is a village in Ujan-e Sharqi Rural District of Tikmeh Dash District in Bostanabad County, East Azerbaijan province, Iran.

== Demographics ==
=== Population ===
At the time of the 2006 National Census, the village's population was 2,397 in 510 households. The following census in 2011 counted 2,518 people in 674 households. The 2016 census measured the population of the village as 2,423 people in 706 households.

== Overview ==
It is located 66 kilometers southeast of Tabriz, the provincial capital and is approximately 12 hectares in size.

Some believe that the center of the ancient city Ujan was near the village. The indigenous villagers say that the ancient Ujan which has seen two severe earthquakes is buried in this region. About 50 years ago, an earthquake occurred near the mountain village called Uçuk Dağ. Then the broken pieces of pottery, quasi-tandoor ditches and some other evidences appeared that was the reason for the existence of the ancient city there.

Some sights of the village are Al deresi şırşırası (AL Valley Falls), Mount Peri cihan ölen, the Village River, the Old Cemetery near Mount Uçuk dağ and many others.

== Nature ==
The main crops of this village are potatoes, carrots, cucumber. Recently, The villagers grow fruits such as apples. Fish is also another source of income for the village. Qasimdaghi is the highest mountain in the village. The Mount Guneyquzey is located in the second class. Among other sights are: Mount Mehralı, Mount Kuş otaran, Mount Ak dağ, Küller (Ujan's the Old Cemetery), Cehennem Valley, Daşlı Bulağ fountain, Baş Bulağ fountain, and Mecci Bulağ fountain. Üçtireler falls, Eyvaz gözesi falls, and Kara alem falls.

Its weather is mountainous, cold and wet.
