= Murun =

Murun may refer to:

== Places ==
- Maran Galu (also romanized as Mūrūn), a village in southeastern Iran
- Mörön, administrative center of the Khövsgöl Province in northern Mongolia
- Murun Massif, Olyokma-Chara Plateau, Russia
- Murun (mountain), highest point of the Murun Massif

== Other uses ==
- Murun Buchstansangur, a fictional cartoon character
