= Kotek (surname) =

Kotek (Czech feminine: Kotková) is a Czech and Polish surname. It probably originated as a diminutive of the Slavic word kot ('tomcat'), but there is also a theory that it could be derived from the German given name Gottfried or from the old Slavic names Chotěbor, Chotěbud, etc. Notable people with the surname include:

- Elliot V. Kotek, Australian producer and filmmaker
- Iosif Kotek (1855–1885), Russian violinist and composer
- Lenka Kotková (born 1973), Czech astronomer
- Olga Kotková (born 1967), Czech art historian and curator
- Tina Kotek (born 1966), American politician
- Vojtěch Kotek (born 1988), Czech actor

== See also ==
- Sibylle Bolla-Kotek (1913–1969), Austrian legal scholar
