= Gur-e-Baba Ali =

Village in Kurdistan province, Iran

Gur-e-Baba Ali Persian: گورباباعلي
- Village
- Location within Iran Location within Iran Kurdistan
- Coordinates: 36°13′46″N 46°52′08″E
- Country: Iran
- Province: Kurdistan
- County: Divandarreh
- District: Karaftu
- Rural District: Owbatu

Population (2016)
  - Total: 418
- Time zone: UTC+3:30 (IRST)

Gur-e-Baba Ali (Persian: گورباباعلي) (Note: Also romanized as Gūrbābā ‘Alī and Gūr-e-Bābā Alī; also known as Kūr Bābā ‘Alī) is a village in, and the capital of, Owbatu Rural District of Karaftu District, Divandarreh County, Kurdistan province, Iran.

== Demographics ==
=== Ethnicity ===
The village is populated by Kurds.

=== Population ===
At the time of the 2006 National Census, the village's population was 386 in 75 households. The following census in 2011 counted 407 people in 83 households. The 2016 census measured the population of the village as 418 people in 95 households.
