= Masoudabad, Kurdistan =

Masoudabad مسعود آباد
- village
- Location within Iran
- Coordinates: 36°19′00″N 46°52′00″E
- Country: Iran
- Province: Kurdistan
- County: Divandarreh
- Bakhsh: Karaftu
- Rural District: Obatu

Population (2006)
  - Total: 178
- Time zone: UTC+3:30 (IRST)
  - Summer (DST): UTC+4:30 (IRDT)

Masoudabad (Persian: مسعود آباد, also Romanized as Mas‘ūdābād) is a village in Obatu Rural District, Karaftu District, Divandarreh County, Kurdistan Province, Iran. At the 2006 census, its population was 178, in 37 families. The village is populated by Kurds.
