= Shali Shal =

Village in Kurdistan province, Iran

Shali Shal Persian: شالي شل
- Village
- Location within Iran Location within Iran Kurdistan
- Coordinates: 36°10′24″N 47°02′50″E
- Country: Iran
- Province: Kurdistan
- County: Divandarreh
- District: Karaftu
- Rural District: Kani Shirin

Population (2016)
  - Total: 510
- Time zone: UTC+3:30 (IRST)

Shali Shal (Persian: شالي شل) (Note: Also romanized as Shālī Shal) is a village in, and the capital of, Kani Shirin Rural District of Karaftu District, Divandarreh County, Kurdistan province, Iran.

== Demographics ==
=== Ethnicity ===
The village is populated by Kurds.

=== Population ===
At the time of the 2006 National Census, the village's population was 578 in 129 households. The following census in 2011 counted 524 people in 130 households. The 2016 census measured the population of the village as 510 people in 131 households.
