= Seyar-e Sofla, East Azerbaijan =

Seyar-e Sofla سيرسفلي
- Village
- Location within Iran
- Coordinates: 37°34′56″N 46°44′08″E
- Country: Iran
- Province: East Azerbaijan
- County: Bostanabad
- Bakhsh: Tekmeh Dash
- Rural District: Sahandabad

Population (2006)
  - Total: 191
- Time zone: UTC+3:30 (IRST)
  - Summer (DST): UTC+4:30 (IRDT)

Seyar-e Sofla (Persian: سيرسفلي, also Romanized as Seyar-e Soflá; also known as Seyar-e Pā'īn) is a village in Sahandabad Rural District, Tekmeh Dash District, Bostanabad County, East Azerbaijan Province, Iran. At the 2006 census, its population was 191, in 51 families.
