= Dahnab =

Village in East Azerbaijan province, Iran

Dahnab Persian: دهناب
- Village
- Location within Iran
- Coordinates: 37°38′05″N 46°44′16″E
- Country: Iran
- Province: East Azerbaijan
- County: Bostanabad
- District: Tikmeh Dash
- Rural District: Sahandabad

Population (2016)
  - Total: 184
- Time zone: UTC+3:30 (IRST)

Dahnab (Persian: دهناب) (Note: Also romanized as Dahnāb) is a village in Sahandabad Rural District of Tikmeh Dash District in Bostanabad County, East Azerbaijan province, Iran.

== Demographics ==
=== Population ===
At the time of the 2006 National Census, the village's population was 195 in 46 households. The following census in 2011 counted 168 people in 43 households. The 2016 census measured the population of the village as 184 people in 48 households.
