= Bayazidabad, Divandarreh =

Bayazidabad بايزيد آباد
- Village
- Location within Iran
- Coordinates: 36°17′02″N 46°52′49″E
- Country: Iran
- Province: Kurdistan
- County: Divandarreh
- Bakhsh: Karaftu
- Rural District: Obatu

Population (2006)
  - Total: 246
- Time zone: UTC+3:30 (IRST)
  - Summer (DST): UTC+4:30 (IRDT)

Bayazidabad (Persian: بايزيد آباد, also Romanized as Bāyazīdābād) is a village in Obatu Rural District, Karaftu District, Divandarreh County, Kurdistan Province, Iran. At the 2006 census, its population was 246, in 40 families. The village is populated by Kurds.
