= Charmkhowran-e Bala =

Charmkhowran-e Bala چرم خوران بالا
- Village
- Location within Iran
- Coordinates: 37°44′45″N 47°01′51″E
- Country: Iran
- Province: East Azerbaijan
- County: Bostanabad
- Bakhsh: Tekmeh Dash
- Rural District: Abbas-e Gharbi

Population (2006)
  - Total: 206
- Time zone: UTC+3:30 (IRST)
  - Summer (DST): UTC+4:30 (IRDT)

Charmkhowran-e Bala (Persian: چرم خوران بالا, also Romanized as Charmkhowrān-e Bālā and Charmkhvorān-e Bālā) is a village in Abbas-e Gharbi Rural District, Tekmeh Dash District, Bostanabad County, East Azerbaijan Province, Iran. At the 2006 census, its population was 206, in 43 families.
