= Charmkhowran-e Sofla =

Charmkhowran-e Sofla چرم خوران سفلي
- Village
- Location within Iran
- Coordinates: 37°44′43″N 46°59′23″E
- Country: Iran
- Province: East Azerbaijan
- County: Bostanabad
- Bakhsh: Tekmeh Dash
- Rural District: Abbas-e Gharbi

Population (2006)
  - Total: 416
- Time zone: UTC+3:30 (IRST)
  - Summer (DST): UTC+4:30 (IRDT)

Charmkhowran-e Sofla (Persian: چرم خوران سفلي, also Romanized as Charmkhowrān-e Soflá; also known as Charmkhowrān-e Pā'īn and Charmkhvār-e Pā'īn) is a village in Abbas-e Gharbi Rural District, Tekmeh Dash District, Bostanabad County, East Azerbaijan Province, Iran. At the 2006 census, its population was 416, in 99 families.
