= Ahmadabad, Bostanabad =

Village in East Azerbaijan province, Iran

Ahmadabad Persian: احمداباد
- Village
- Location within Iran
- Coordinates: 37°40′53″N 47°00′12″E
- Country: Iran
- Province: East Azerbaijan
- County: Bostanabad
- District: Tikmeh Dash
- Rural District: Abbas-e Gharbi

Population (2016)
  - Total: 670
- Time zone: UTC+3:30 (IRST)

Ahmadabad (Persian: احمداباد) (Note: Also romanized as Aḩmadābād) is a village in Abbas-e Gharbi Rural District of Tikmeh Dash District in Bostanabad County, East Azerbaijan province, Iran.

== Demographics ==
=== Population ===
At the time of the 2006 National Census, the village's population was 720 in 141 households. The following census in 2011 counted 670 people in 167 households. The 2016 census measured the population of the village as 670 people in 193 households.
