= Khashen Daraq =

Village in East Azerbaijan province, Iran

Khashen Daraq Persian: خشندرق
- Village
- Location within Iran
- Coordinates: 37°42′45″N 46°51′47″E
- Country: Iran
- Province: East Azerbaijan
- County: Bostanabad
- District: Tikmeh Dash
- Rural District: Ujan-e Sharqi

Population (2016)
  - Total: 364
- Time zone: UTC+3:30 (IRST)

Khashen Daraq (Persian: خشندرق) (Note: Also known as Khashīn Daraq) is a village in Ujan-e Sharqi Rural District of Tikmeh Dash District in Bostanabad County, East Azerbaijan province, Iran.

== Demographics ==
=== Population ===
At the time of the 2006 National Census, the village's population was 440 in 90 households. The following census in 2011 counted 399 people in 106 households. The 2016 census measured the population of the village as 364 people in 98 households.
