= Kani Kabud-e Maran =

Kani Kabud-e Maran کانی کبود مران
- Village
- Location within Iran
- Coordinates: 36°17′24″N 46°56′56″E
- Country: Iran
- Province: Kurdistan
- County: Divandarreh
- Bakhsh: Karaftu
- Rural District: Obatu

Population (2006)
  - Total: 196
- Time zone: UTC+3:30 (IRST)
  - Summer (DST): UTC+4:30 (IRDT)

Kani Kabud-e Maran (Persian: کانی کبود مران, also Romanized as Kānī Kabūd-e Marān; also known as Kānī Kabūd) is a village in Obatu Rural District, Karaftu District, Divandarreh County, Kurdistan Province, Iran. At the 2006 census, its population was 196, in 41 families. The village is populated by Kurds.
