= Aghcheh Kohal-e Rajabanlu =

Aghcheh Kohal-e Rajabanlu اغچه كهل رجبانلو
- Village
- Location within Iran
- Coordinates: 37°37′22″N 46°57′33″E
- Country: Iran
- Province: East Azerbaijan
- County: Bostanabad
- Bakhsh: Tekmeh Dash
- Rural District: Abbas-e Gharbi

Population (2006)
  - Total: 334
- Time zone: UTC+3:30 (IRST)
  - Summer (DST): UTC+4:30 (IRDT)

Aghcheh Kohal-e Rajabanlu (Persian: اغچه كهل رجبانلو, also Romanized as Āghcheh Kohal-e Rajabānlū; also known as Āghjeh Kohal) is a village in Abbas-e Gharbi Rural District, Tekmeh Dash District, Bostanabad County, East Azerbaijan Province, Iran. At the 2006 census, its population was 334, in 63 families.
