= Seyar-e Olya, East Azerbaijan =

Seyar-e Olya سيرعليا
- Village
- Location within Iran
- Coordinates: 37°36′32″N 46°42′11″E
- Country: Iran
- Province: East Azerbaijan
- County: Bostanabad
- Bakhsh: Tekmeh Dash
- Rural District: Sahandabad

Population (2006)
  - Total: 196
- Time zone: UTC+3:30 (IRST)
  - Summer (DST): UTC+4:30 (IRDT)

Seyar-e Olya (Persian: سيرعليا, also Romanized as Seyar-e ‘Olyā; also known as Seyar-e Bālā) is a village in Sahandabad Rural District, Tekmeh Dash District, Bostanabad County, East Azerbaijan Province, Iran. At the 2006 census, its population was 196, in 34 families.
