= Qaleh Rutaleh =

Village in Kurdistan province, Iran

Qaleh Rutaleh Persian: قلعه روتله
- Village
- Location within Iran Location within Iran Kurdistan
- Coordinates: 36°02′38″N 47°00′56″E
- Country: Iran
- Province: Kurdistan
- County: Divandarreh
- District: Karaftu
- Rural District: Zarrineh

Population (2016)
  - Total: 1,030
- Time zone: UTC+3:30 (IRST)

Qaleh Rutaleh (Persian: قلعه روتله) (Note: Also romanized as Qal'eh Rūtaleh) is a village in Zarrineh Rural District of Karaftu District, Divandarreh County, Kurdistan province, Iran.

== Demographics ==
=== Ethnicity ===
The village is populated by Kurds.

=== Population ===
At the time of the 2006 National Census, the village's population was 1,001 in 206 households. The following census in 2011 counted 1,090 people in 275 households. The 2016 census measured the population of the village as 1,030 people in 289 households. It was the most populous village in its rural district.
