= Qaleh Kohneh, Owbatu =

Village in Kurdistan province, Iran

Qaleh Kohneh Persian: قلعه كهنه
- Village
- Location within Iran Location within Iran Kurdistan
- Coordinates: 36°12′37″N 46°51′28″E
- Country: Iran
- Province: Kurdistan
- County: Divandarreh
- District: Karaftu
- Rural District: Owbatu

Population (2016)
  - Total: 433
- Time zone: UTC+3:30 (IRST)

Qaleh Kohneh (Persian: قلعه كهنه) (Note: Also romanized as Qal‘eh Kohneh) is a village in Owbatu Rural District of Karaftu District, Divandarreh County, Kurdistan province, Iran.

== Demographics ==
=== Ethnicity ===
The village is populated by Kurds.

=== Population ===
At the time of the 2006 National Census, the village's population was 545 in 114 households. The following census in 2011 counted 483 people in 109 households. The 2016 census measured the population of the village as 433 people in 105 households. It was the most populous village in its rural district.
