= Tekmeh Dash =

City in East Azerbaijan province, Iran

Tikmeh Dash Persian: تيكمه داش
- City
- Location within Iran
- Coordinates: 37°43′30″N 46°56′15″E
- Country: Iran
- Province: East Azerbaijan
- County: Bostanabad
- District: Tikmeh Dash
- Established as a city: 1997

Population (2016)
  - Total: 2,974
- Time zone: UTC+3:30 (IRST)

Tikmeh Dash (Persian: تيكمه داش) (Note: Also romanized as Tikmeh Dāsh; also known as Tihma Dash, Tikili Dash and Tikma Dash) is a city in, and the capital of, Tikmeh Dash District in Bostanabad County, East Azerbaijan province, Iran. It also serves as the administrative center for Abbas-e Gharbi Rural District. The village of Tikmeh Dash was converted to a city in 1997.

== Demographics ==
=== Population ===
At the time of the 2006 National Census, the city's population was 2,468 in 633 households. The following census in 2011 counted 2,645 people in 754 households. The 2016 census measured the population of the city as 2,974 people in 913 households.
