= Zaglujeh, Abbas-e Sharqi =

Zaglujeh زگلوجه
- Village
- Location within Iran
- Coordinates: 37°39′48″N 47°08′25″E
- Country: Iran
- Province: East Azerbaijan
- County: Bostanabad
- Bakhsh: Tekmeh Dash
- Rural District: Abbas-e Sharqi

Population (2006)
  - Total: 59
- Time zone: UTC+3:30 (IRST)
  - Summer (DST): UTC+4:30 (IRDT)

Zaglujeh (Persian: زگلوجه, also Romanized as Zaglūjeh) is a village in Abbas-e Sharqi Rural District, Tekmeh Dash District, Bostanabad County, East Azerbaijan Province, Iran. At the 2006 census, its population was 59, in 25 families.
