= Zaglujeh, Ujan-e Sharqi =

Village in East Azerbaijan province, Iran

Zaglujeh Persian: زگلوجه
- Village
- Location within Iran
- Coordinates: 37°47′48″N 46°54′33″E
- Country: Iran
- Province: East Azerbaijan
- County: Bostanabad
- District: Tikmeh Dash
- Rural District: Ujan-e Sharqi

Population (2016)
  - Total: 782
- Time zone: UTC+3:30 (IRST)

Zaglujeh (Persian: زگلوجه) (Note: Also romanized as Zaglūjeh) is a village in Ujan-e Sharqi Rural District of Tikmeh Dash District in Bostanabad County, East Azerbaijan province, Iran.

== Demographics ==
=== Population ===
At the time of the 2006 National Census, the village's population was 689 in 131 households. The following census in 2011 counted 732 people in 176 households. The 2016 census measured the population of the village as 782 people in 237 households.
