= Qarah Chay-ye Hajj Ali =

Village in East Azerbaijan province, Iran

Qarah Chay-ye Hajj Ali Persian: قره چاي حاج علي
- Village
- Location within Iran
- Coordinates: 37°38′01″N 46°41′53″E
- Country: Iran
- Province: East Azerbaijan
- County: Bostanabad
- District: Tikmeh Dash
- Rural District: Sahandabad

Population (2016)
  - Total: 407
- Time zone: UTC+3:30 (IRST)

Qarah Chay-ye Hajj Ali (Persian: قره چاي حاج علي) (Note: Also romanized as Qarah Chāy-e Ḩājjī ‘Alī and Qareh Chāy-e Ḩājjī ‘Alī) is a village in, and the capital of, Sahandabad Rural District in Tikmeh Dash District of Bostanabad County, East Azerbaijan province, Iran.

== Demographics ==
=== Population ===
At the time of the 2006 National Census, the village's population was 508 in 103 households. The following census in 2011 counted 424 people in 122 households. The 2016 census measured the population of the village as 407 people in 104 households. It was the most populous village in its rural district.
