= Qareh Baba, Ujan-e Sharqi =

Village in East Azerbaijan province, Iran

Qareh Baba Persian: قره بابا
- Village
- Location within Iran
- Coordinates: 37°45′27″N 46°51′34″E
- Country: Iran
- Province: East Azerbaijan
- County: Bostanabad
- District: Tikmeh Dash
- Rural District: Ujan-e Sharqi

Population (2016)
  - Total: 3,085
- Time zone: UTC+3:30 (IRST)

Qareh Baba (Persian: قره بابا) (Note: Also romanized as Qareh Bābā; also known as Qarā Bābā) is a village in, and the capital of, Ujan-e Sharqi Rural District in Tikmeh Dash District of Bostanabad County, East Azerbaijan province, Iran.

== Demographics ==
=== Population ===
At the time of the 2006 National Census, the village's population was 2,472 in 530 households. The following census in 2011 counted 2,725 people in 770 households. The 2016 census measured the population of the village as 3,085 people in 929 households. It was the most populous village in its rural district.
