= Zarrineh =

City in Kurdistan province, Iran

Zarrineh Persian: زرينه
- City
- Location within Iran Location within Iran Kurdistan
- Coordinates: 36°03′42″N 46°55′08″E
- Country: Iran
- Province: Kurdistan
- County: Divandarreh
- District: Karaftu

Population (2016)
  - Total: 2,091
- Time zone: UTC+3:30 (IRST)

Zarrineh (Persian: زرينه) (Note: Also romanized as Zarrīneh) is a city in, and the capital of, Karaftu District of Divandarreh County, Kurdistan province, Iran. It also serves as the administrative center for Zarrineh Rural District.

== Climate ==
Zarrineh has a Mediterranean-influenced warm-summer humid continental climate (Dsb) according to the Köppen climate classification.

Climate data for Zarrineh (1989-2005normals), elevation: 2,142.6 m (7,030 ft)
Month	Jan	Feb	Mar	Apr	May	Jun	Jul	Aug	Sep	Oct	Nov	Dec	Year
Daily mean °C (°F)	−5.4 (22.3)	−4.9 (23.2)	0.0 (32.0)	6.9 (44.4)	11.4 (52.5)	16.8 (62.2)	21.1 (70.0)	21.1 (70.0)	16.2 (61.2)	10.4 (50.7)	3.4 (38.1)	−2.1 (28.2)	7.9 (46.2)
Average precipitation mm (inches)	45.0 (1.77)	41.6 (1.64)	60.9 (2.40)	71.0 (2.80)	35.5 (1.40)	7.8 (0.31)	6.2 (0.24)	1.7 (0.07)	2.0 (0.08)	24.4 (0.96)	57.4 (2.26)	41.3 (1.63)	394.8 (15.56)
Source: Iran Meteorological Organization (temperatures), (precipitation)

== Demographics ==
=== Ethnicity ===
The city is populated by Kurds.

=== Population ===
At the time of the 2006 National Census, the city's population was 1,272 in 266 households. The following census in 2011 counted 1,854 people in 387 households. The 2016 census measured the population of the city as 2,091 people in 495 households.
