= Qaleh Kohneh, Kermanshah =

Qaleh Kohneh قلعه كهنه
- Village
- Location within Iran
- Coordinates: 34°26′26″N 46°54′19″E
- Country: Iran
- Province: Kermanshah
- County: Kermanshah
- Bakhsh: Central
- Rural District: Baladarband

Population (2006)
  - Total: 19
- Time zone: UTC+3:30 (IRST)
  - Summer (DST): UTC+4:30 (IRDT)

Qaleh Kohneh (Persian: قلعه كهنه, also Romanized as Qal‘eh Kohneh) is a village in Baladarband Rural District, in the Central District of Kermanshah County, Kermanshah Province, Iran. At the 2006 census, its population was 19, in 5 families.
