= Maran, Kerman =

Maran ماران
- Village
- Location within Iran
- Coordinates: 28°26′24″N 57°02′24″E
- Country: Iran
- Province: Kerman
- County: Faryab
- Bakhsh: Central
- Rural District: Hur

Population (2006)
  - Total: 67
- Time zone: UTC+3:30 (IRST)
  - Summer (DST): UTC+4:30 (IRDT)

Maran (Persian: ماران, also Romanized as Mārān) is a village in Hur Rural District, in the Central District of Faryab County, Kerman Province, Iran. At the 2006 census, its population was 67, in 17 families.
