= Sibylle Bolla-Kotek =

Austrian legal historian (1913–1969)

Sibylle von Bolla-Kotek (8 June 1913 – 22 February 1969) was an Austrian scholar of legal history and the first female professor in a legal faculty in Austria.

== Life ==
Sibylle von Bolla was born in Bratislava (then Pressburg in Austria-Hungary) in 1913, the daughter of the Hungarian Oberst (Colonel) Gideon Bolla de Csáford-Jobbaháza and his wife Margarethe. The family moved to Teplice in the new state of Czechoslovakia in 1923, where von Bolla attended a humanistic Gymnasium. Her father died in 1929 and her family was supported thereafter by her father's army colleague Theodor Körner.

Von Bolla studied jurisprudence at the German University in Prague, graduating in 1935. Her teachers included Egon Weiß and Mariano San Nicolò, an expert on cuneiform law. They encouraged her to undertake a legal career.

In 1938, von Bolla received a license to teach Roman law and ancient legal history. Among her specialty areas were papyrology and cuneiform texts. One of her colleagues was Bedřich Hrozný, the decipherer of the Hittite language. In 1944, von Bolla received the title of "extraordinary professor," but despite the support of the faculty, promotion to an academic chair was barred to her.

Von Bolla left Czechoslovakia in 1945, moving to Tyrol where her sister lived. Contacts with the University of Innsbruck did not bear fruit. In 1946 she received a license to teach from the legal faculty at the University of Vienna. In 1949 she became an extraordinary professor there. She married Alfred Kotek, a doctor, in 1950.

In 1958, Bolla-Kotek was appointed ordinary professor of Roman law, papyrology, Near Eastern law, and civic law at the University of Vienna. She was the first woman to be appointed professor in a legal faculty in Austria. Along with Fritz Schwind, Walter Selb, Gerhard Thür and Peter E. Pieler, she maintained the research focus on ancient legal history at Vienna University, which had been established by Leopold Wenger.

Bolla-Kotek was also named an academic chair. Her work covered family law, university administration, and employment law. After her death, this combination of ancient law and modern social law was further maintained by the law faculty at Vienna University. One of her students was her successor in the chair, Theo Mayer-Maly.

In 1968, Bolla-Kotek suffered a serious riding accident. The after-effects of this accident and an attack of influenza resulted in her death at the age of fifty-five on 22 February 1969.

One of the "Gates of Memory" at the Vienna University campus, in Vienna's ninth district, Alsergrund, is named after Sibylle Bolla-Kotek. A small group of ancient coins from Bolla-Kotek's collection are now kept in the collection of the Institute for Numismatics and Monetary History in Vienna.

== Selected works ==
- Die Entwicklung des Fiskus zum Privatrechtssubjekt mit Beiträgen zur Lehre vom aerarium: Eine rechtsgeschichtliche Untersuchung. Prag 1938.
- Sammlung von Reichs-, Staats- und Bundesgesetzen sowie sonstigen Vorschriften für den Dienstgebrauch der österreichischen Bundesgendarmerie. Wien 1950.
- Aus römischem und bürgerlichem Erbrecht. Wien 1950.
- Grundriß des österreichischen Internationalen Privatrechtes. Leitfäden durch das österreichische Recht. Wien 1952.
- "Der römische Rechtsgelehrte." In: Speculum iuris et ecclesiarum. Festschrift für Willibald M. Plöchl zum 60. Geburtstag. Wien 1967, pp. 17–30.
- Untersuchungen zur Tiermiete und Viehpacht im Altertum. Münchener Beiträge zur Papyrusforschung und antiken Rechtsgeschichte. Heft 30. München 1940, 2nd edition 1969. ISBN 3-406-00630-2 (nachträglich vergebene ISBN, nicht allgemein verwendbar).

== Bibliography ==
- Theo Mayer-Maly: "Sibylle Bolla-Kotek zum Gedächtnis." In: Zeitschrift der Savigny-Stiftung für Rechtsgeschichte. Romanistische Abteilung. Vol. 86 (1969), pp. 570–573
- Ursula Floßmann: "Sibylle Bolla-Kotek, die erste Rechtsprofessorin an der Universität Wien." in Christian Klicpera (ed.): Soziale Dienste: Anforderungen, Organisationsformen, Perspektiven. WUV-Studienbücher. Wien 1992. ISBN 3-85114-115-6.
- Ursula Floßmann: "Sibylle Bolla-Kotek, die erste Rechtsprofessorin an der Universität Wien." In: Waltraud Heindl, Marina Tichy (ed.): Durch Erkenntnis zu Freiheit und Glück … Frauen an der Universität Wien (ab 1897) (= Schriftenreihe des Universitätsarchivs, Universität Wien; 5). Wien 1993. ISBN 3-85114-049-4, pp. 247–256.
- Elisabeth Berger: Sibylle Bolla-Kotek. In: Brigitta Keintzel, Ilse Korotin (Hrsg.): Wissenschafterinnen in und aus Österreich. Leben – Werk – Wirken. Böhlau, Wien/Köln/Weimar 2002, ISBN 3-205-99467-1, pp. 81–84 (online).
- Brigitta Keintzel: "Wissenschafterinnen in und aus Österreich." In Elisabeth Lebensaft (ed.): Desiderate der österreichischen Frauenbiografieforschung. Symposium des Instituts für Wissenschaft und Kunst abgehalten in der Österreichischen Nationalbibliothek am 17. November 2000. Österreichisches biographisches Lexikon: Schriftenreihe Band 7. Wien 2001. ISBN 3-7001-2906-8.
- Gerhard Strejcek: Statt ins Kloster an die Universität, Wiener Zeitung, 7 June 2013.
