= Olga Kotková =

Czech art historian, curator and museum director

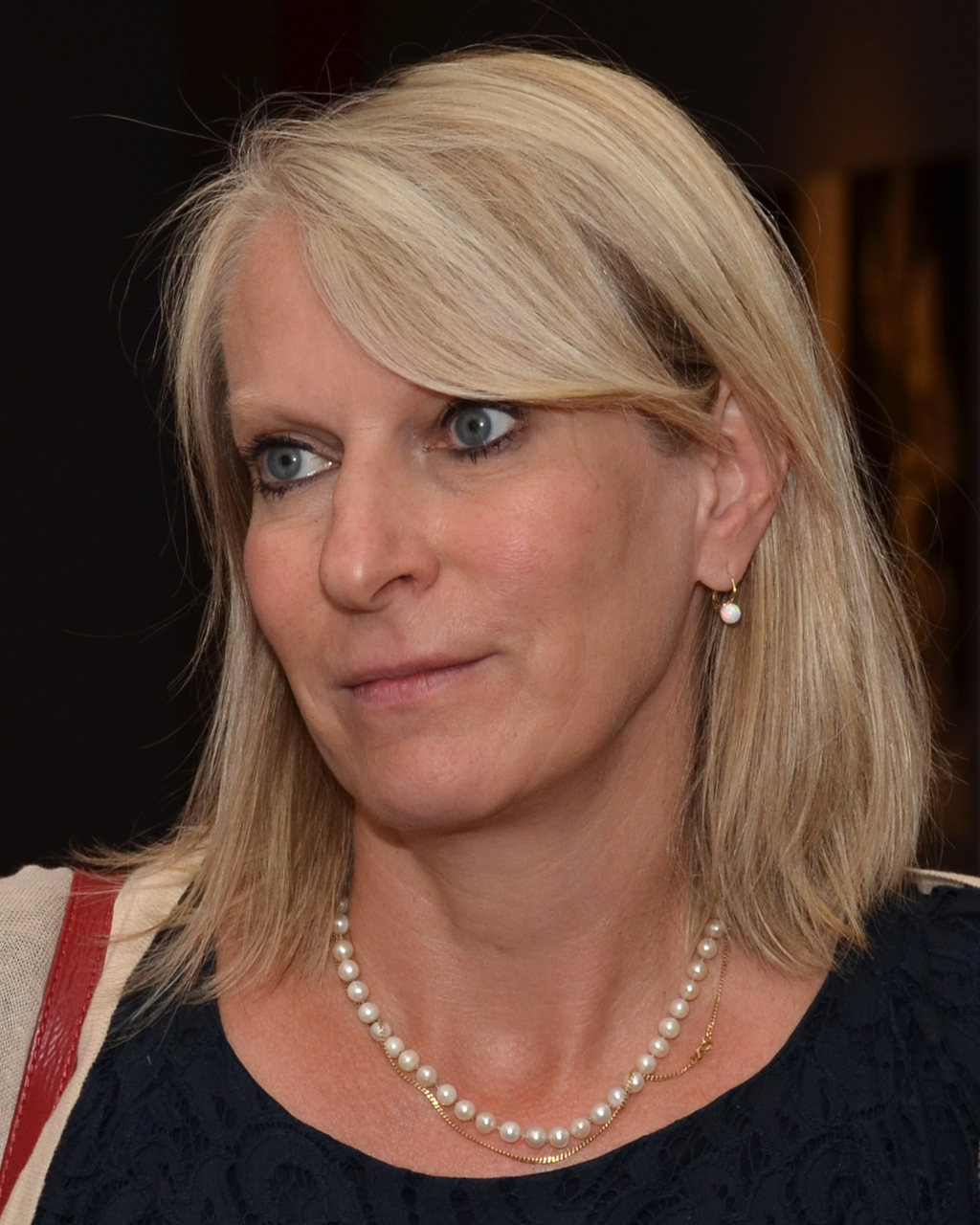
- Kotková in 2018
- Born: 20 January 1967 (age 59); Prague, Czechoslovakia
- Education: Charles University (PhD)
- Occupations: Art historian, curator, museum director
- Employer: National Gallery Prague
- Known for: Scholarship on Old Master painting, Netherlandish art, German art, Austrian art, and Flemish painting

Olga Kotková (born 20 January 1967) is a Czech art historian, curator and museum director. She is General Director of the National Gallery Prague and Director of its Collection of Old Masters.

Her scholarship focuses on fifteenth- and sixteenth-century German, Austrian, and Netherlandish painting and sculpture, as well as Rudolfine painting and seventeenth-century Flemish painting. Kotková's work has centered on artistic exchange between Netherlandish and German art and the art produced in the Lands of the Bohemian Crown.

== National Gallery Prague ==
Kotková is Director of the Collection of Old Masters at the National Gallery Prague, based at the Sternberg Palace.

In 2026, following the dismissal of general director Alicja Knast, the Czech Minister of Culture placed the institution under Kotková's leadership pending a formal selection process. The National Gallery Prague subsequently listed Kotková as General Director and Director of the Collection of Old Masters.

As a curator and scholar at the National Gallery Prague, Kotková has worked on exhibitions and publications involving Old Master painting, sculpture, connoisseurship, collecting history, copies, forgeries, and the movement of artistic forms between Central Europe and the Low Countries.

== Curatorial work ==
Kotková was curator of Forgeries? Forgeries!, an exhibition at the National Gallery Prague devoted to originals, replicas, copies, imitations, and forged works of art. She also curated Clay Sculptures: Terracottas by 15th–19th Century Italian Masters in the Collection of the National Gallery Prague, a project connecting art-historical and scientific research on Italian terracotta sculpture.

In 2025, she was lead curator and author of Women Artists 1300–1900 at the National Gallery Prague. Kotková has described the exhibition as growing from a question about the visibility of women artists within Old Master displays.

== Scholarship ==
Kotková has been a member of CODART, the international network of curators of Dutch and Flemish art, since 1998.

Her publications include catalogues raisonnés of the National Gallery Prague's Old Master holdings, including Netherlandish Painting 1480–1600, German and Austrian Painting of the 14th–16th Centuries, and a co-authored catalogue of German, Austrian, French, Hungarian, and Netherlandish sculpture from 1200 to 1550. She has also lectured in art history at the Catholic Theological Faculty of Charles University.

She has extensively written and edited catalogues and studies on artists including Lucas Cranach the Elder, Albrecht Dürer, Roelant Savery, Jan Gossaert, Maerten van Heemskerck, and followers of Hieronymus Bosch.

== Education and early career ==
Kotková studied aesthetics with a focus on art history at Charles University in Prague. She defended her dissertation in 2013 at the university's Faculty of Education on the collecting of German and Austrian paintings from the fourteenth to the sixteenth centuries. She has worked in the Old Masters Collection of the National Gallery Prague since 1990.

Her early institutional work included the systematic cataloguing of the gallery's Old Master holdings. In 1999, she authored the first volume in the National Gallery's illustrated summary catalogue series for the Collection of Old Masters, devoted to Netherlandish painting from 1480 to 1600.

== Selected publications ==
- Kotková, Olga. Netherlandish Painting, 1480–1600: Illustrated Summary Catalogue I/1. Prague: National Gallery, 1999. ISBN 80-7035-178-0.
- Kotková, Olga, ed. Roelandt Savery. Malíř ve službách císaře Rudolfa II. / A Painter in the Services of Emperor Rudolf II. Prague and Kortrijk: Národní galerie v Praze and Broelmuseum, 2010.
- Kotková, Olga. "Savery's Paintings in the Inventories of Prague Castle." Studia Rudolphina 12–13, 2013, pp. 134–145.
- Kotková, Olga. "Fascinated by Dürer: Dirck de Quade van Ravesteyn paints Madonna and Child with Music-Making Angels." Studia Rudolphina, 2014, pp. 123–128.
- Kotková, Olga. The National Gallery in Prague. German, Austrian, French, Hungarian and Netherlandish Sculpture 1200–1550. Illustrated Summary Catalogue II/1. Prague: National Gallery, 2014.
- Kotková, Olga, ed. Cranach ze všech stran / Cranach from All Sides. Prague: National Gallery Prague, 2016.
- Kotková, Olga, and Radka Šefců, eds. Clay Sculptures: Terracottas by 15th to 19th Century Italian Masters in the Collection of the National Gallery in Prague. Prague: National Gallery Prague, 2022. ISBN 978-80-7035-807-8.
