= Sorkheh-ye Yek =

Sorkheh-ye Yek سرخه يك
- Village
- Location within Iran
- Coordinates: 31°33′54″N 48°49′14″E
- Country: Iran
- Province: Khuzestan
- County: Ahvaz
- Bakhsh: Central
- Rural District: Anaqcheh

Population (2006)
  - Total: 170
- Time zone: UTC+3:30 (IRST)
  - Summer (DST): UTC+4:30 (IRDT)

Sorkheh-ye Yek (Persian: سرخه يك; also known as Al Sarkha, Shaikh Amaibir, and Sorkheh) is a village in Anaqcheh Rural District, in the Central District of Ahvaz County, Khuzestan Province, Iran. At the 2006 census, its population was 170, in 42 families.
