= Sorkheh-ye Do =

Sorkheh-ye Do سرخه دو
- Village
- Location within Iran
- Coordinates: 31°32′51″N 48°49′44″E
- Country: Iran
- Province: Khuzestan
- County: Ahvaz
- Bakhsh: Central
- Rural District: Anaqcheh

Population (2006)
  - Total: 62
- Time zone: UTC+3:30 (IRST)
  - Summer (DST): UTC+4:30 (IRDT)

Sorkheh-ye Do (Persian: سرخه دو) is a village in Anaqcheh Rural District, in the Central District of Ahvaz County, Khuzestan Province, Iran. At the 2006 census, its population was 62, in 17 families.
