= Kani Kabud, Divandarreh =

Kani Kabud کانی کبود
- Village
- Location within Iran
- Coordinates: 35°47′54″N 46°56′59″E
- Country: Iran
- Province: Kurdistan
- County: Divandarreh
- Bakhsh: Saral
- Rural District: Saral

Population (2006)
  - Total: 95
- Time zone: UTC+3:30 (IRST)
  - Summer (DST): UTC+4:30 (IRDT)

Kani Kabud (Persian: کانی کبود, also Romanized as Kānī Kabūd) is a village in Saral Rural District, Saral District, Divandarreh County, Kurdistan Province, Iran. At the 2006 census, its population was 95 and had 23 families. The village is populated by Kurds.
