= Marab =

Marab ماراب
- Village
- Location within Iran
- Coordinates: 34°45′41″N 46°49′43″E
- Country: Iran
- Province: Kurdistan
- County: Kamyaran
- Bakhsh: Central
- Rural District: Shahu

Population (2006)
  - Total: 1,185
- Time zone: UTC+3:30 (IRST)
  - Summer (DST): UTC+4:30 (IRDT)

Marab (Persian: ماراب, also Romanized as Mārāb and Mār Āb; also known as Mārān, Qal‘a Marab, Qal‘eh Marāb, and Qal‘eh-ye Mārān) is a village in Shahu Rural District, in the Central District of Kamyaran County, Kurdistan Province, Iran. At the 2006 census, its population was 1,185, in 263 families. The village is populated by Kurds.
