= Kani Kabud, Kermanshah =

Kani Kabud کانی کبود
- Village
- Location within Iran
- Coordinates: 34°41′12″N 46°36′14″E
- Country: Iran
- Province: Kermanshah
- County: Ravansar
- Bakhsh: Central
- Rural District: Badr

Population (2006)
  - Total: 115
- Time zone: UTC+3:30 (IRST)
  - Summer (DST): UTC+4:30 (IRDT)

Kani Kabud (Persian: کانی کبود, also Romanized as Kānī Kabūd) is a village in Badr Rural District, in the Central District of Ravansar County, Kermanshah Province, Iran. At the 2006 census, its population was 115, in 25 families.
