= Beklik =

Beklik بكليك
- Village
- Location within Iran
- Coordinates: 34°51′35″N 49°46′04″E
- Country: Iran
- Province: Markazi
- County: Tafresh
- Bakhsh: Central
- Rural District: Rudbar

Population (2006)
  - Total: 111
- Time zone: UTC+3:30 (IRST)
  - Summer (DST): UTC+4:30 (IRDT)

Beklik (Persian: بكليك, also Romanized as Beklīk; also known as Beglīg, Beyglīk, and Qareh Chāy) is a village in Rudbar Rural District, in the Central District of Tafresh County, Markazi Province, Iran. At the 2006 census, its population was 111, in 41 families.
