= Qarah Baba, West Azerbaijan =

Qarah Baba قره بابا
- Village
- Location within Iran
- Coordinates: 36°27′11″N 46°58′06″E
- Country: Iran
- Province: West Azerbaijan
- County: Takab
- Bakhsh: Central
- Rural District: Karaftu

Population (2006)
  - Total: 32
- Time zone: UTC+3:30 (IRST)
  - Summer (DST): UTC+4:30 (IRDT)

Qarah Baba (Persian: قره بابا, also Romanized as Qarah Bābā and Qareh Bābā) is a village in Karaftu Rural District, in the Central District of Takab County, West Azerbaijan Province, Iran. At the 2006 census, its population was 32, in 6 families.
