= Kas Nazan, Saqqez =

Kas Nazan كس نزان
- Village
- Location within Iran
- Coordinates: 36°06′26″N 46°12′50″E
- Country: Iran
- Province: Kurdistan
- County: Saqqez
- Bakhsh: Sarshiv
- Rural District: Zu ol Faqr

Population (2006)
  - Total: 498
- Time zone: UTC+3:30 (IRST)
  - Summer (DST): UTC+4:30 (IRDT)

Kas Nazan (Persian: كس نزان, also Romanized as Kas Nazān; also known as Kasan Nazān) is a village in Zu ol Faqr Rural District, Sarshiv District, Saqqez County, Kurdistan Province, Iran. At the 2006 census, its population was 498, in 122 families. The village is populated by Kurds.
