= Maran Galu =

Maran Galu مارون گلو
- Village
- Location within Iran
- Coordinates: 28°39′33″N 57°38′56″E
- Country: Iran
- Province: Kerman
- County: Jiroft
- Bakhsh: Central
- Rural District: Halil

Population (2006)
  - Total: 72
- Time zone: UTC+3:30 (IRST)
  - Summer (DST): UTC+4:30 (IRDT)

Maran Galu (Persian: مارون گلو, also Romanized as Mārān Galū; also known as Mārān, Mārān Galūyeh, and Mūrūn) is a village in Halil Rural District, in the Central District of Jiroft County, Kerman Province, Iran. At the 2006 census, its population was 72, in 16 families.
