= Ujan-e Sharqi Rural District =

Rural district in East Azerbaijan province, Iran

Ujan-e Sharqi Rural District Persian: دهستان اوجان شرقي
- Rural District
- Location within Iran
- Coordinates: 37°43′N 46°50′E
- Country: Iran
- Province: East Azerbaijan
- County: Bostanabad
- District: Tikmeh Dash
- Established: 1987
- Capital: Qareh Baba

Population (2016)
  - Total: 8,429
- Time zone: UTC+3:30 (IRST)

Ujan-e Sharqi Rural District (Persian: دهستان اوجان شرقي) is in Tikmeh Dash District of Bostanabad County, East Azerbaijan province, Iran. Its capital is the village of Qareh Baba.

== Demographics ==
=== Population ===
At the time of the 2006 National Census, the rural district's population was 8,595 in 1,791 households. There were 8,313 inhabitants in 2,239 households at the following census of 2011. The 2016 census measured the population of the rural district as 8,429 in 2,485 households. The most populous of its 22 villages was Qareh Baba, with 3,085 people.

=== Other villages in the rural district ===
- Eyn ol Din
- Khalileh Deh
- Khashen Daraq
- Zaglujeh
