= Sahandabad Rural District =

Rural district in East Azerbaijan province, Iran

Sahandabad Rural District Persian: دهستان سهندآباد
- Rural District
- Location within Iran
- Coordinates: 37°38′N 46°40′E
- Country: Iran
- Province: East Azerbaijan
- County: Bostanabad
- District: Tikmeh Dash
- Established: 1987
- Capital: Qarah Chay-ye Hajj Ali

Population (2016)
  - Total: 2,101
- Time zone: UTC+3:30 (IRST)

Sahandabad Rural District (Persian: دهستان سهندآباد) is in Tikmeh Dash District of Bostanabad County, East Azerbaijan province, Iran. Its capital is the village of Qarah Chay-ye Hajj Ali.

== Demographics ==
=== Population ===
At the time of the 2006 National Census, the rural district's population was 2,862 in 610 households. There were 2,760 inhabitants in 789 households at the following census of 2011. The 2016 census measured the population of the rural district as 2,101 in 575 households. The most populous of its 27 villages was Qarah Chay-ye Hajj Ali, with 407 people.

=== Other villages in the rural district ===
- Almalu
- Dahnab
