= Kani Shirin Rural District =

Rural district in Kurdistan province, Iran

Kani Shirin Rural District Persian: دهستان كاني شيرين
- Rural District
- Location within Iran Location within Iran Kurdistan
- Coordinates: 36°12′17″N 47°04′56″E
- Country: Iran
- Province: Kurdistan
- County: Divandarreh
- District: Karaftu
- Capital: Shali Shal

Population (2016)
  - Total: 3,691
- Time zone: UTC+3:30 (IRST)

Kani Shirin Rural District (Persian: دهستان كاني شيرين) is in Karaftu District of Divandarreh County, Kurdistan province, Iran. Its capital is the village of Shali Shal.

== Demographics ==
=== Population ===
At the time of the 2006 National Census, the rural district's population was 5,477 in 1,098 households. There were 4,448 inhabitants in 1,026 households at the following census of 2011. The 2016 census measured the population of the rural district as 3,691 in 929 households. The most populous of its 18 villages was Papaleh, with 859 people.
