= Zarrineh Rural District =

Rural district in Kurdistan province, Iran

Zarrineh Rural District Persian: دهستان زرينه
- Rural District
- Location within Iran Location within Iran Kurdistan
- Coordinates: 36°03′55″N 46°54′24″E
- Country: Iran
- Province: Kurdistan
- County: Divandarreh
- District: Karaftu
- Capital: Zarrineh

Population (2016)
  - Total: 6,047
- Time zone: UTC+3:30 (IRST)

Zarrineh Rural District (Persian: دهستان زرينه) is in Karaftu District of Divandarreh County, Kurdistan province, Iran. It is administered from the city of Zarrineh.

== Demographics ==
=== Population ===
At the time of the 2006 National Census, the rural district's population was 7,076 in 1,366 households. There were 6,832 inhabitants in 1,562 households at the following census of 2011. The 2016 census measured the population of the rural district as 6,047 in 1,583 households. The most populous of its 18 villages was Qaleh Rutaleh, with 1,030 people.
