= Owbatu Rural District =

Rural district in Kurdistan province, Iran

Owbatu Rural District Persian: دهستان اوباتو
- Rural District
- Location within Iran Location within Iran Kurdistan
- Coordinates: 36°15′16″N 46°53′28″E
- Country: Iran
- Province: Kurdistan
- County: Divandarreh
- District: Karaftu
- Capital: Gur-e-Baba Ali

Population (2016)
  - Total: 3,782
- Time zone: UTC+3:30 (IRST)

Owbatu Rural District (Persian: دهستان اوباتو) is in Karaftu District of Divandarreh County, Kurdistan province, Iran. Its capital is the village of Gur-e-Baba Ali.

== Demographics ==
=== Population ===
At the time of the 2006 National Census, the rural district's population was 5,113 in 1,065 households. There were 4,270 inhabitants in 1,002 households at the following census of 2011. The 2016 census measured the population of the rural district as 3,782 in 937 households. The most populous of its 18 villages was Qaleh Kohneh, with 433 people.
