= Abbas-e Gharbi Rural District =

Rural district in East Azerbaijan province, Iran

Abbas-e Gharbi Rural District Persian: دهستان عباس غربي
- Rural District
- Location within Iran
- Coordinates: 37°42′N 46°59′E
- Country: Iran
- Province: East Azerbaijan
- County: Bostanabad
- District: Tikmeh Dash
- Established: 1987
- Capital: Tekmeh Dash

Population (2016)
  - Total: 7,243
- Time zone: UTC+3:30 (IRST)

Abbas-e Gharbi Rural District (Persian: دهستان عباس غربي) is in Tikmeh Dash District of Bostanabad County, East Azerbaijan province, Iran. It is administered from the city of Tekmeh Dash.

== Demographics ==
=== Population ===
At the time of the 2006 National Census, the rural district's population was 10,070 in 2,110 households. There were 8,451 inhabitants in 2,196 households at the following census of 2011. The 2016 census measured the population of the rural district as 7,243 in 2,112 households. The most populous of its 28 villages was Alkhalaj, with 1,730 people.

=== Other villages in the rural district ===
- Ahmadabad
- Shirvaneh Deh
