= Karaftu District =

District in Kurdistan province, Iran

Karaftu District Persian: بخش کرفتو
- District
- Location within Iran Location within Iran Kurdistan
- Coordinates: 36°08′47″N 47°00′04″E
- Country: Iran
- Province: Kurdistan
- County: Divandarreh
- Capital: Zarrineh

Population (2016)
  - Total: 15,611
- Time zone: UTC+3:30 (IRST)

Karaftu District (Persian: بخش کرفتو) is in Divandarreh County, Kurdistan province, Iran. Its capital is the city of Zarrineh.

== Demographics ==
=== Population ===
At the time of the 2006 National Census, the district's population was 18,938 in 3,795 households. The following census in 2011 counted 17,404 people in 3,977 households. The 2016 census measured the population of the district as 15,611 inhabitants in 3,944 households.

=== Administrative divisions ===
Karaftu District Population
Administrative Divisions	2006	2011	2016
Kani Shirin RD	5,477	4,448	3,691
Obatu RD	5,113	4,270	3,782
Zarrineh RD	7,076	6,832	6,047
Zarrineh (city)	1,272	1,854	2,091
Total	18,938	17,404	15,611
RD = Rural District
