= Tikmeh Dash District (Bostanabad County) =

District in East Azerbaijan province, Iran

Tikmeh Dash District Persian: بخش تيکمه داش
- District
- Location within Iran
- Coordinates: 37°41′N 46°51′E
- Country: Iran
- Province: East Azerbaijan
- County: Bostanabad
- Capital: Tekmeh Dash

Population (2016)
  - Total: 22,545
- Time zone: UTC+3:30 (IRST)

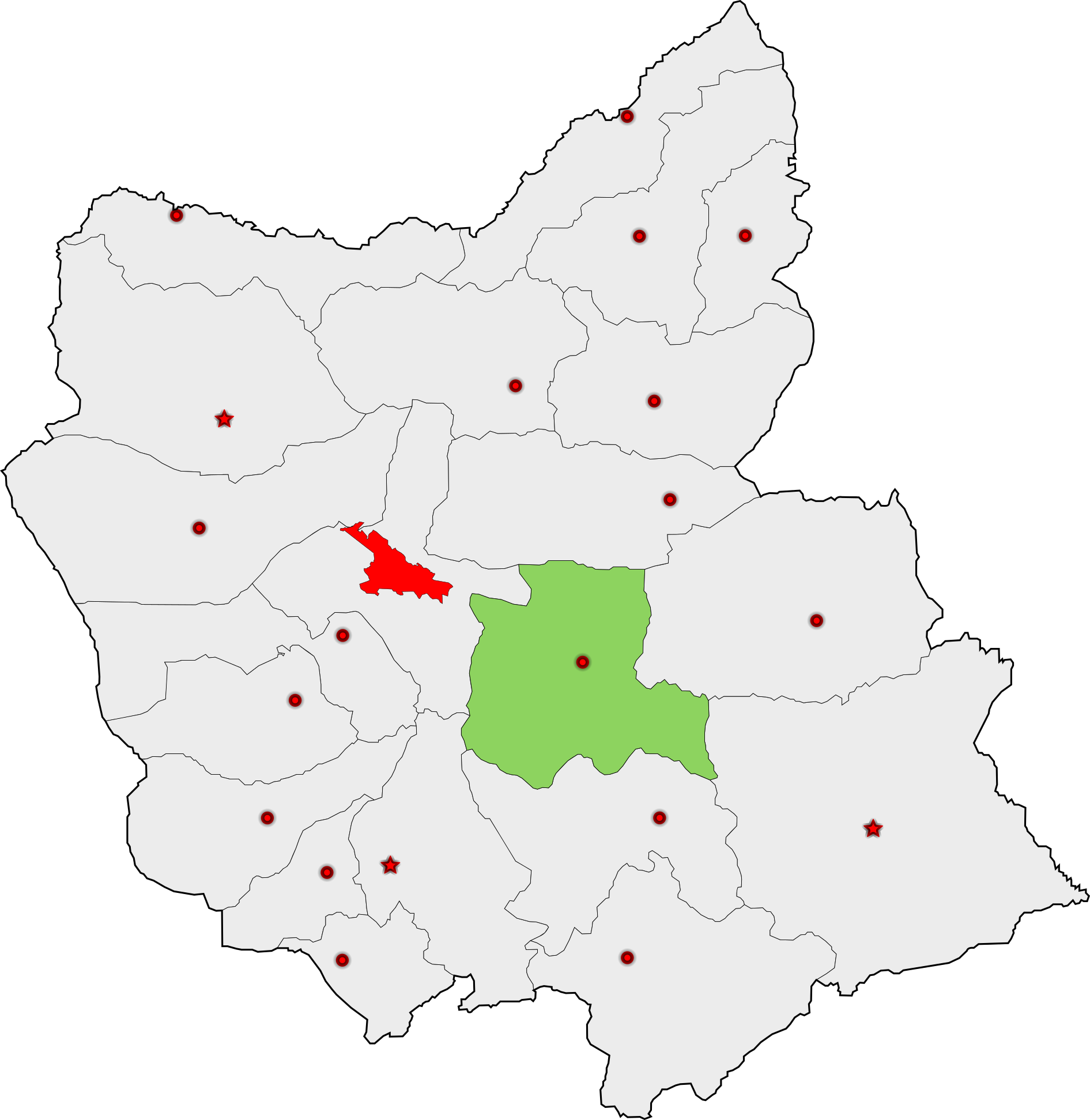
Bostanabad County location in East Azerbaijan Province, Iran

Tikmeh Dash District (Persian: بخش تيکمه داش) is in Bostanabad County, East Azerbaijan province, Iran. Its capital is the city of Tekmeh Dash.

== Demographics ==
=== Population ===
At the time of the 2006 National Census, the district's population was 27,051 in 5,914 households. The following census in 2011 counted 24,366 people in 6,705 households. The 2016 census measured the population of the district as 22,545 inhabitants living in 6,782 households.

=== Administrative divisions ===
Tikmeh Dash District Population
Administrative Divisions	2006	2011	2016
Abbas-e Gharbi RD	10,070	8,451	7,243
Abbas-e Sharqi RD	3,056	2,197	1,798
Sahandabad RD	2,862	2,760	2,101
Ujan-e Sharqi RD	8,595	8,313	8,429
Tekmeh Dash (city)	2,468	2,645	2,974
Total	27,051	24,366	22,545
RD = Rural District
