= List of populated places in Sivas Province =

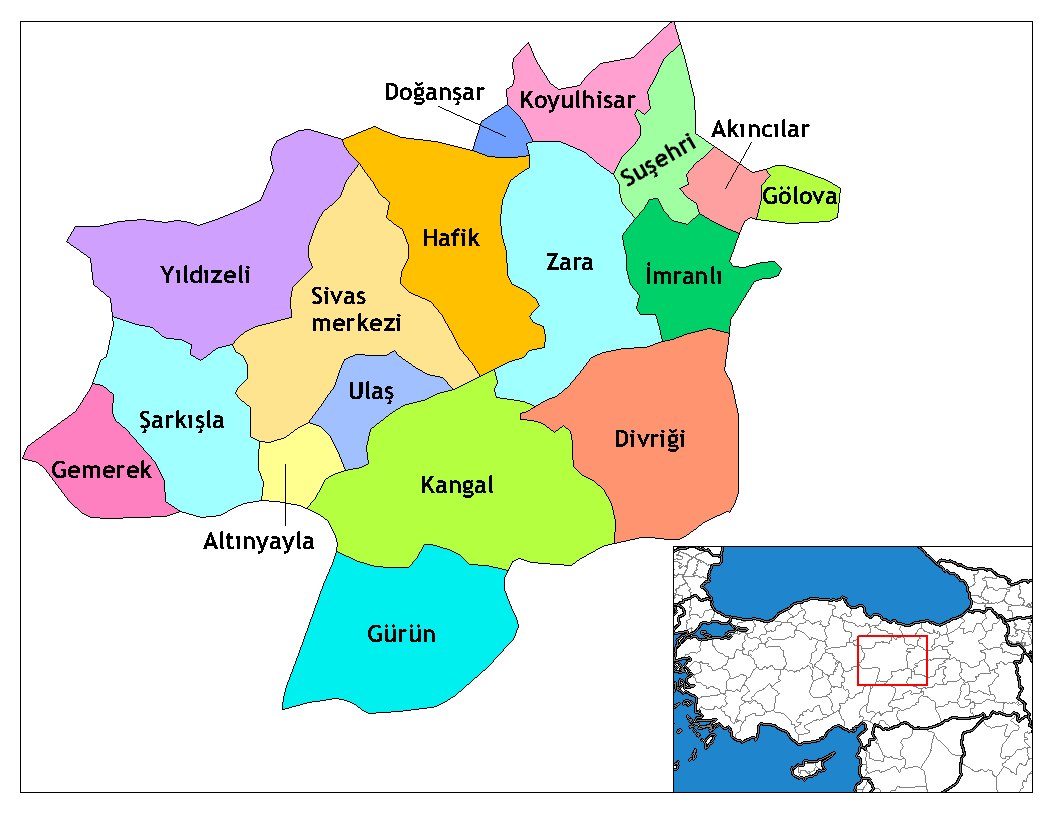
Sivas Province

Below is the list of populated places in Sivas Province, Turkey by the districts. In the following lists first place in each list is the administrative center of the district.

== Sivas ==
- Sivas
- Acıdere
- Acıpınar
- Ağılkaya
- Akçahan
- Akçainiş
- Akçamescit
- Akkoç
- Akkuzulu
- Akören
- Akpınar
- Alahacı
- Apa
- Armutlu
- Arpayazı
- Asarcık
- Aşağıyıldızlı
- Aydoğmuş
- Aylı
- Bademkaya
- Barcın
- Başıbüyük
- Başsöğüt
- Bedirli
- Beşpınar
- Beştepe
- Beypınarı
- Bingöl
- Bostancık
- Budaklı
- Çallı
- Çatalkaya
- Çaygören
- Çaypınar
- Çelebiler
- Çeltek
- Çerçideresi
- Çongar
- Damılı
- Damlacık
- Demiryazı
- Dikmencik
- Doğanca
- Dörteylül
- Durdulu
- Düzova
- Ebuhan
- Eğribucak
- Emirhan
- Eskiapardı
- Eskiboğazkesen
- Eskiköy
- Gazibey
- Gaziköy
- Gözeli
- Gözmen
- Güllüce
- Güllük
- Gündüzköy
- Günece
- Güneli
- Güney
- Günören
- Hacıali
- Hanlı
- Harmancık
- Hasbey
- Haydarlı
- Hayırbey
- Hayranlı
- Herekli
- Hıdırnalı
- Himmetfakı
- Yıldız Köyü
- Hocabey
- İlkindi
- İmaret

== Akıncılar ==
- Akıncılar
- Abdurrahman
- Aşağıyeniköy
- Avşar
- Balçık
- Ballıdere
- Çiçekli
- Derecik
- Doğantepe
- Dündar
- Ekenek
- Elibüyük
- Eskibağ
- Geyikpınar
- Göllüce
- İkizyurt

== Altınyayla ==
- Altınyayla
- Başyayla
- Bayındır
- Doğupınar
- Gümüşdiğin
- Güzeloğlan
- Harmandalı

== Divriği ==
- Divriği
- Adatepe
- Ağaçlıgöl
- Akbaba
- Akmeşe
- Akpelit
- Arıkbaşı
- Atmalıoğlu
- Avşarcık
- Bahçeli
- Bahtiyar
- Balova
- Başören
- Bayırlı
- Bayırüstü
- Beldibi
- Beyköy
- Çakırağa
- Çakırtarla
- Çakmakdüzü
- Çamlık
- Çamurlu
- Çayören
- Çayözü
- Çiğdemli
- Çitme
- Çobandurağı
- Çukuröz
- Demirdağ
- Derimli
- Dikmeçay
- Diktaş
- Dişbudak
- Dumluca
- Duruköy
- Eğrisu
- Ekinbaşı
- Erikli
- Eskibeyli
- Gedikbaşı
- Gezey
- Gökçebel
- Gökçeharman
- Gölören
- Göndüren
- Gözecik
- Gözecik
- Güllüce
- Günbahçe
- Güneş
- Güneyevler
- Güresin
- Gürpınar
- Güvenkaya
- Handere
- Höbek
- İkizbaşak
- Karasar

== Doğanşar ==
- Doğanşar
- Alanköy
- Alazlı
- Arslantaş
- Avcıçayı
- Başekin
- Beşağaç
- Boyalı
- Çalıcı
- Çatpınar
- Darıkol
- Ekinciler
- Eskiköy
- Göçüköy
- İçdere

== Gemerek ==
- Gemerek
- Akçaşar
- Baştepe
- Bulhasan
- Burhanköy
- Cesurlar
- Çatköy
- Çiçekoğlu
- Dendil
- Durgunsu
- Ekizce
- Eskiçubuk
- Eskiyurt
- Eşikli
- Hacıyusuf

== Gölova ==
- Gölova
- Akçataş
- Arslanca
- Aşağıtepecik
- Aydoğdu
- Boğazköy
- Bozat
- Canköy
- Çakırşeyh
- Çataklı
- Çevrecik
- Çobanlı
- Çukuryurt
- Demirkonak
- Dikköy
- Gözlüce
- Gözüküçük
- Günalan
- Güzören
- İlyasköy

== Gürün ==
- Gürün
- Ağaçlı
- Akdere
- Akpınar
- Ayvalı
- Bağlıçay
- Bahçeiçi
- Başören
- Beypınarı
- Bozhüyük
- Böğrüdelik
- Camiliyurt
- Çamlıca
- Çiçekyurt
- Davulhüyük
- Dayakpınar
- Deveçayırı
- Dürmepınar
- Erdoğan
- Eskibektaşlı
- Eskihamal
- Göbekören
- Gökçeyazı
- Güldede
- Güllübucak
- Güneş
- Hüyüklüyurt

== Hafik ==
- Acıpınar
- Adamlı
- Akkaya
- Aktaş
- Alanyurt
- Alçıören
- Alibeyli
- Aylıoğlu
- Bahçecik
- Bakımlı
- Bayıraltı
- Bayramtepe
- Benlikaya
- Besinli
- Beydili
- Beykonağı
- Celalli
- Çakmak
- Çaltılı
- Çınarlı
- Çimenyenice
- Çömlekli
- Çukurbelen
- Değirmenboğazı
- Değirmenseki
- Demirciköy
- Derince
- Dışkapı
- Durulmuş
- Düğer
- Dündar
- Düzyayla
- Ekingölü
- Emre
- Esenli
- Evci
- Eymir
- Gedikçayırı
- Gölcük
- Göydün
- Gülpınar
- Günyamaç
- Topçuyeniköy

== İmranlı ==
- İmranlı
- Akçakale
- Akkaya
- Aksu
- Alacahacı
- Altınca
- Ardıçalan
- Arık
- Aşağıboğaz
- Aşağıçulha
- Aşağışeyhli
- Atlıca
- Avşar
- Aydın
- Aydoğan
- Bağyazı
- Bahadun
- Bahtiyar
- Bardaklı
- Başlıca
- Becek
- Beğendik
- Boğanak
- Boğazören
- Borular
- Bulgurluk
- Celaldamı
- Cerit
- Çalıyurt
- Çandır
- Çukuryurt
- Dağyurdu
- Darıseki
- Delice
- Demirtaş
- Dereköy
- Doğançal
- Ekincik
- Erdemşah
- Eskidere
- Eskikapumahmut
- Eskikeşlik
- Gelenli
- Gelintarla
- Gökçebel
- Gökdere
- Görünmezkale
- Güven

== Kangal ==
- Kangal
- Akçakale
- Akçamağara
- Akçaşehir
- Akdere
- Akgedik
- Akgedik
- Akpınar
- Aktepe
- Armağan
- Arpalı
- Aşağıhüyük
- Avşarören
- Bahçeliyurt
- Bektaşköy
- Beyyurdu
- Boğaz
- Bozarmut
- Bulak
- Cevizköy
- Çağlıcaören
- Çaltepe
- Çamurlu
- Çatköy
- Çiftlikören
- Çipil
- Dağönü
- Davulbaz
- Dayılı
- Deligazili
- Deliktaş
- Delioğlanderesi
- Dereköy
- Dışlık
- Düzce
- Eğricek
- Elalibey
- Elkondu
- Etyemez
- Eymir
- Gebelikatran
- Gençali
- Güneypınar
- Gürükbekir
- Hamal
- Hamzabey
- Hatunçayırı
- Hüyüklüyurt
- Irmaç
- İğdeli
- İğdelidere
- İmamdamı

== Koyulhisar ==
- Koyulhisar
- Akseki
- Aksu
- Aydınlar
- Bahçeköy
- Ballıca
- Boyalı
- Bozkuş
- Çandır
- Çaylı
- Çiçeközü
- Çukuroba
- Değirmentaş
- Dilekli
- Ekinözü
- Gökdere
- Gölcük
- Gümüşlü
- Günışık
- Güzelyurt
- Hacıilyas
- İkizyaka

== Suşehri ==
- Suşehri
- Akçaağıl
- Akıncı
- Aksu
- Akşar
- Arpacı
- Arpayazı
- Aşağıakören
- Aşağısarıca
- Balkara
- Beydeğirmeni
- Bostancık
- Boyalıca
- Büyükgüzel
- Camili
- Cevizli
- Çakırlı
- Çamlıdere
- Çitlice
- Çokrak
- Elmaseki
- Erence
- Esenyaka
- Eskimeşe
- Eskişar
- Eskitoprak
- Gelengeç
- Gökçekaş
- Gökçekent
- Gözköy
- Güdeli
- Gümüştaş
- Güneyli
- Güngören
- Günlüce
- Hödücek

== Şarkışla ==
- Şarkışla
- Kaymak
- Abdallı
- Ahmetli
- Akçasu
- Alaçayır
- Alaman
- Alıkören
- Arıklar
- Bağlararası
- Bahçealan
- Baltalar
- Başağaç
- Başören
- Benlihasan
- Beyyurdu
- Bozkurt
- Burnukara
- Büyüktopaç
- Büyükyüreğil
- Canabdal
- Çamlıca
- Çanakçı
- Çatalyol
- Çekem
- Çiçekliyurt
- Demirboğa
- Demirköprü
- Dikili
- Dökmetaş
- Döllük
- Elmalı
- Fakılı
- Faraşderesi
- Gaziköy
- Gücük
- Gülören
- Gümüştepe
- Hardal
- Harunköy
- Hocabey
- Hüyükköy
- İğdecik
- İğdeliören
- İğecik
- İlyashacı

== Ulaş ==
- Ulaş
- Acıyurt
- Akkaya
- Aşağıada
- Başçayır
- Boğazdere
- Bostankaya
- Çavdar
- Çevirme
- Demircilik
- Ekincioğlu
- Eskikarahisar
- Ezentere
- Gümüşpınar
- Güneşli
- Gürpınar
- Hacımirza

== Yıldızeli ==
- Yıldızeli
- Akçakale
- Akçalı
- Akkoca
- Akören
- Akpınar
- Akpınarbeleni
- Alaca
- Altınoluk
- Arslandoğmuş
- Aşağıçakmak
- Aşağıekecik
- Avcıpınarı
- Bakırcıoğlu
- Banaz
- Başköy
- Bayat
- Bedel
- Belcik
- Buğdayören
- Büyükakören
- Cizözü
- Cumhuriyet
- Çağlayan
- Çırçır
- Çobansaray
- Çöte
- Çubuk
- Çukursaray
- Danaören
- Danişment
- Davulalan
- Delikkaya
- Demircilik
- Demiroluk
- Demirözü
- Dereköy
- Dikilitaş
- Direkli
- Doğanlı
- Emirler
- Erenler
- Esençay
- Eşmebaşı
- Fındıcak
- Geynik
- Gökçeli
- Gökkaya
- Halkaçayır
- Hamzaşeyh
- Ilıcaköy
- İğdecikler
- İğnebey

== Zara ==
- Zara
- Adamfakı
- Ağlıkçay
- Ahmethacı
- Akdede
- Akdeğirmen
- Akören
- Akyazı
- Alıçbel
- Alıçlıseki
- Alişanağılı
- Armutçayırı
- Aşağıçamözü
- Aşağıçamurcu
- Aşağıkovacık
- Aşağımescit
- Atalan
- Atgeçmez
- Atkıran
- Avşar
- Bağlama
- Baharşeyh
- Ballıklar
- Becekli
- Bedirören
- Bektaşköy
- Belentarla
- Beypınarı
- Bozkır
- Bulucan
- Burhaniye
- Büyükgüney
- Büyükkaya
- Büyükköy
- Canova
- Cemalköy
- Çatören
- Çaylı
- Çaylıca
- Çaypınar
- Çevirmehan
- Çorak
- Çulhaali
- Danışık
- Derbent
- Deredam
- Dereköy
- Dilekpınarı
- Dipsizgöl
- Düzceli
- Ekinli
- Emirhan
- Esenler
- Evrencik
- Eymir
- Girit
- Göhertaş
- Göktepe
- Gölbaşı
- Güllüali
- Gümüşçevre
- Ilıca
- İğdeli
- İğdir
- İkideğirmen
