= Akıncılar =

Akıncılar may refer to:

== Places in Turkey ==
- Akıncılar, Sivas Province, a town
- Akıncılar District, a district in Sivas Province that contains the town of Akıncılar
- Akıncılar, Bartın Province, a village near Bartın
- Akıncılar, Bursa Province, a neighborhood part of İnegöl
- Akıncılar, Adıyaman Province, a village near Kâhta
- Akıncılar, Denizli Province, a neighborhood part of Tavas
- Akıncılar, Bolu Province, a village in the District of Yeniçağa

== Other places ==
- Akıncılar, Cyprus, a village in Northern Cyprus, also known as Louroujina

== Other subjects ==
- Akıncılar, a Turkish hacker group that took credit for attacking the Charlie Hebdo website after its publication of the "Charia Hebdo" issue in 2011
