= Alişer =

Kurdish leader

Alişer Efendî
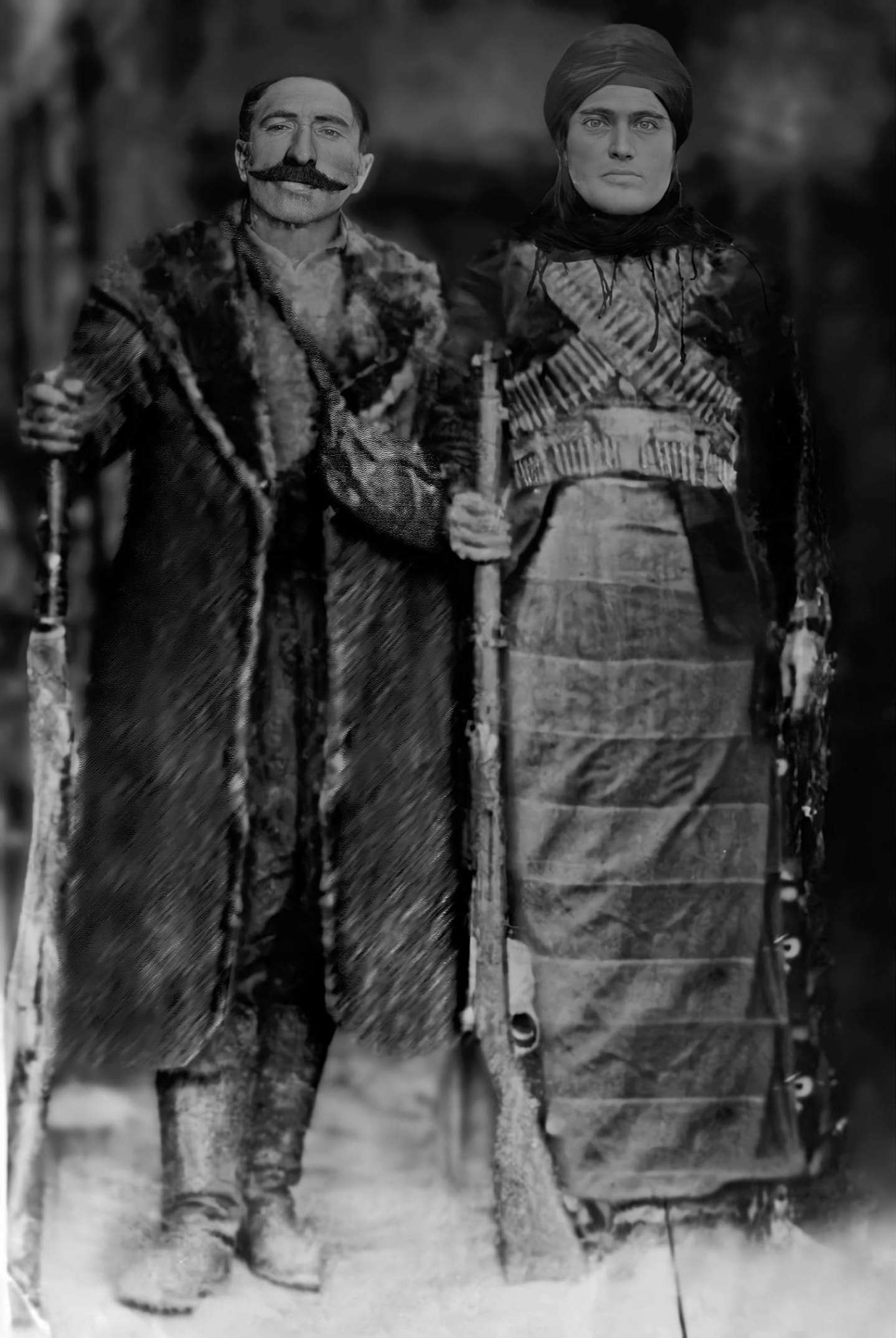

Personal details
- Born: 1862 İmranlı, Sivas Vilayet, Ottoman Empire
- Died: 9 July 1937 (aged 75) Kafat, Ovacık
- Spouse(s): Zarife Xanım (?–9 July 1937)
- Nickname: Alîşêr Efendî

Military service
- Allegiance: Russian Empire (1914–17); Society for the Rise of Kurdistan (1919–21)
- Wars: World War I; Caucasus campaign; Koçgiri rebellion Dersim rebellion

Alişer or Alişir Efendî (Kurdish: Alîşêr Efendî, Zazaki: Elîşer; 1862 at İmranlı, Sivas vilayet - 9 July 1937 at Kafar village, Dersim), was a Kurdish poet, bard, intellectual and leader of Koçgiri tribe who fought against the Ottomans during World War I alongside the Russian Army. He was the organizer of the Koçgiri rebellion and one of the main leaders of the Dersim rebellion.

One of the members of the Koçgiri tribe, who was born in present-day Azger (Atlıca) village of İmranlı district of Sivas, in 1921, the "Koçgiri rebellion", which took place in the Koçgiri region of Sivas, who made a name for himself with the events that have been recorded in official records as the first-degree cause and perpetrator of the "rebellion".

== Early life ==
Alişer was born in the farms of Koçgiri in Ümraniye township and completed his collection in Sivas. He was a very famous Kurdish poet with his natural intelligence, strong logic and reasoning, and extraordinary talent. After the death of Mustafa Pasha, Alişer; the deceased's eldest son, Alişan, was appointed as his guardian and, for this reason, he had a great influence over the general Koçgiri tribes. Alişer used this influence in the full sense of the word for the cause of liberation and the Independence of Kurdistan, and for this purpose, he succeeded in creating a strong unity among the tribes of Dersim. Later, he married his relative, Zarife.

== World War I ==
Alişer joined the Russian army in the 1914 World War in order to secure the independence of Kurdistan. As the Kurdish representative of the Koçgiri, Sivas, Malatya, and Dersim regions, worked for the establishment of an autonomous Kurdistan administration under Russian auspices. During the Russian occupation of Erzincan, Alişer came to the Ovacık district center with a military detachment and abolished the Turkish administration and established a Kurdish administration there. This success had secured the contact points of the Russian armies with Dersim. Already in this period, Dersim was able to establish a completely independent administration. The Russian armies began to retreat, and Alisher was forced to leave them and return to Dersim, where he remained.

Ottoman Turkish commander Vehip Pasha; Since he considered the situation of Dersim very important in terms of politics, he ensured the pardon of Alişer and other Koçkiri and Dersim youth who joined Russia with him in order to win the Kurds, thus allowing Alişer to return to Koçgiri again.

== After World War I ==
The situation that occurred due to the great revolution in Russia at the end of 1917 necessitated the withdrawal of the Russian armies from Erzincan, and the general withdrawal movement that started in the fronts at the end of the same year forced the Armenian forces to take new military measures. Armenian fedayi leader Sebastatsi Murad wanted to make a strong alliance with the Dersimites. During the negotiations with Alişer on this issue, some important conditions could not be agreed and Sebastatsi Murad's attempt failed. According to Alişer's statement, Murad Sebastatsi proposed a project that followed the aim of Greater Armenia alone, and because he was afraid to enter into an alliance about the autonomy and independence of Kurdistan, it was not possible to agree with him and therefore he was forced to withdraw to Western Dersim.

By sending a mandate to the Society for the Rise of Kurdistan in Istanbul, he declared the loyalty of Koçgiri and Dersim Kurds to the Society, and at the same time established branches to this Society with all sides. Later, he came to Dersim and sent telegrams to the Ankara government, together with the Dersimites, regarding the verification of the autonomy of Kurdistan in accordance with the Treaty of Sèvres. Apart from these activities in the field of diplomacy. Taking advantage of his presence in Dersim, he was giving conferences on the Kurdish people and creating important currents as well as establishing organizations to ensure the Kurdish independence.

== Koçgiri rebellion ==
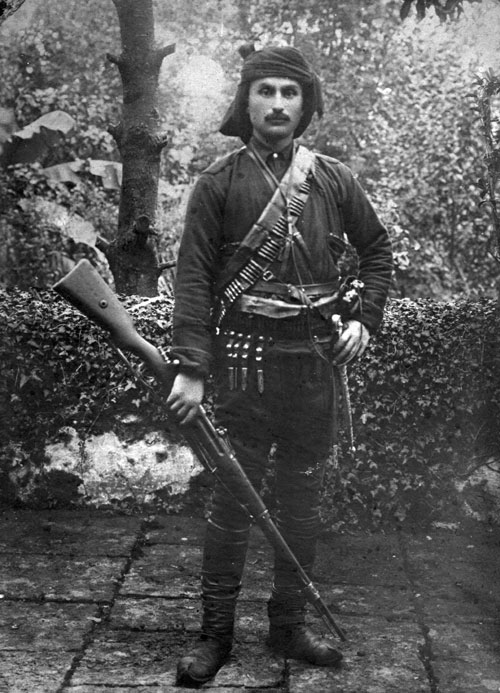
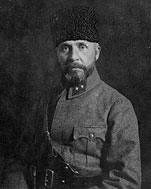
Topal Osman (one of the perpetrators of Armenian genocide and Greek genocide in Pontus) and Nureddin Pasha, commanders who suppressed the Koçgiri rebellion

The Kurds around Dersim began to prepare for an eventual showdown with the Turkish nationalists and raided several Turkish weapon depots. By October 1920 they captured enough to feel themselves in a position of strength and Alisan Bey, the leader of Refahiye prepared the tribes for independence. Finally, on the 15 November 1920, they delivered a declaration to the Kemalists which stated the following.

- The Government in Ankara should abide by the agreement the Kurds had with the Sultan in Istanbul and accept the Kurdish autonomy
- The Government in Ankara should also inform the people who wrote the declaration concerning their approach towards an autonomous Kurdistan.
- All the Kurdish prisoners in the prisons of Erzincan, Malatya, Elaziz (today Elazıĝ), and Sivas shall be released.
- The Turkish administration in the areas with a Kurdish majority must leave
- And the Turkish military which was dispatched to the Kurdish areas, should withdraw

They requested an answer by the 24 November 1920. On the 25 December, the Kurds again demanded more political rights to be given to them in the Provinces of Diyarbakir, Bitlis, Van and Elaziz as agreed on in the Treaty of Sèvres.

Ali Kemal, the Governor of Erzincan at the time, noted in his memoirs that Alisher had the title of "Inspector of the Army of Caliphate". Therefore, although the Koçgiri Rebellion only was an attempt by some Kurdish nationalist notables in the region to take advantage of the fact that some articles of the Treaty of Sèvres (10 August 1920) allowed the Kurds autonomy or independence, some other sources claim that Alişer was pro-Caliphate and pro-Sultanate and this was the reason for the Koçgiri rebellion.

The Turkish Government offered to assign a Kurdish Mütessarif to the Elaziz to Pertek, but the revolutionaries represented by Seyid Riza and Alişan Bey (official from the Refahiye) refused the offer, and repeated their demand that they want an independent Kurdish government and not one imposed by Ankara. The commander of the Central Army Nureddin Pasha sent a force of some 3,000 cavalrymen and irregulars including Topal Osman's battalions. By February, fighting between parties began and the Turks demanded the unconditional surrender of the Kurdish revolutionaries. A first major encounter between the factions ended victorious for the Kurds, but fighting went on and the rebels were crushed by 17 June 1921.

According to some sources, Nureddin Pasha said (other sources attribute this to Topal Osman):

"In homeland (Turkey), we cleaned up people who say "zo" (Armenians), I'm going to clean up people who say "lo" (Kurds) by their roots"

— Turkish original, Türkiye'de (Memlekette) Zo (Ermeniler) diyenleri temizledik, Lo (Kürtler) diyenlerin köklerini de ben temizleyeceğim.

== Dersim rebellion and death ==
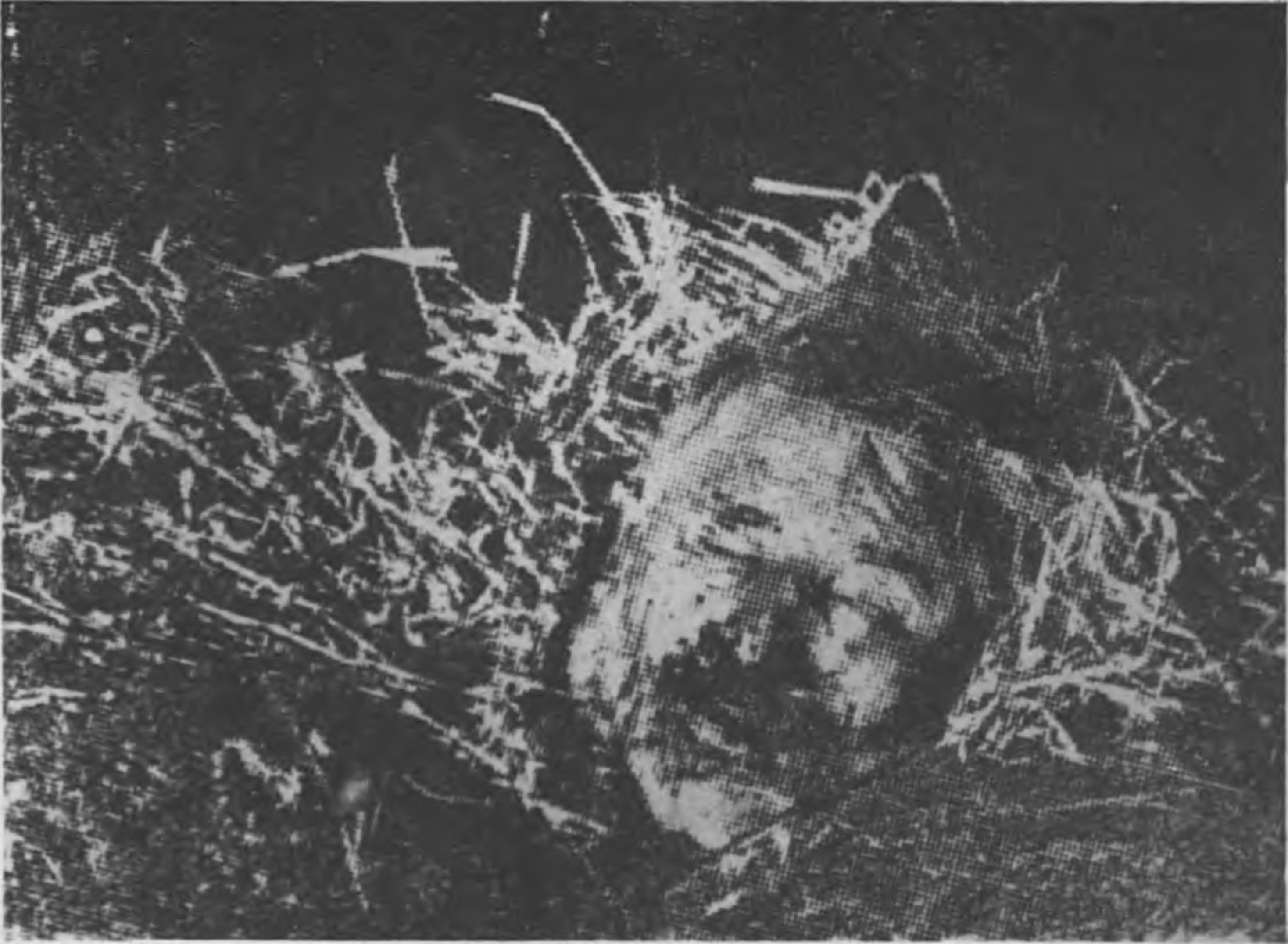
Alishir's skull, photo taken after his death

In the 1937 Dersim rebellion, he cooperated with Seyid Riza and tried to strengthen the spirituality of the Dersimites and to reinforce the general unity with words, pen and de facto. The center of gravity of the war was on Seyid Riza, and Alişer was arrangement war plans. Therefore, General Alpdoğan's sole purpose was to have the Alişer destroyed. It was to ensure the fulfillment of this purpose, the Rehber was involved in the war for fifteen days. According to Nuri Dersimi, the Rehber, who was 'bitch and cunning', was able to gain the trust of all other chiefs other than Seyid Riza, even Alişer. Seyid Riza's headquarters was in Halvori Vank, and Alişer's in Ağdat, he even had a familial melce in a cave at the foot of Tujik mountain. Since the Rehber was always in contact with Alişer, he was aware of all the plans of Seyid Riza. In order to prevent further human bloodshed, Seyid Riza had decided that Alisher would seek asylum in Iran or Iraq and beg the intercession of the governments of France and England. The Rehber was aware of this decision. The Rehber then went to Alisher with eight armed companions and tricked him to death.

== Alişer's poetry ==
Alişer wrote poems and uttered sayings in Kurdish. The poet and poet Alişer, who wrote poems with the pseudonym Taki from time to time, frequently used the motifs of the Kurdish Alevi faith in his poems and combined both –political and religious – fields by placing elements of a belief in his political goals. In this way, he must have had the intention of making his political ideals more easily accepted or consolidated among the community by making his communication with the public effective.

Alişer wrote the following in a poem as wrote in Kurdish, that insulted Topal Osman by mentioning his cruelty and cruelty:

The mountain of Pülümür must pull,
I went to him slowly,
May your house burn, bloody Topal Osman,
And you shot our youth,
And you're suing us,
My heart is grieving, brother grieving,
Smoke with snow enveloped the mountain in his lap,
May Shah of the Brave catch up with us,
My heart is grieving, brother grieving,
Smoke and snow covered the mountain,
Go, go, tribe, go,
They locked our deceased in our door,
They killed the fresh brides and took the gold from her head,
My heart is sad, my brother is sad,
Smoke with snow took the mountain,
The bridges under Pülümür are two or three,
They killed the bride and groom when they were two or three years old,
Let our cause remain for the judgement, for Imam Husayn,
My heart is grieving, brother grieving.

In this poem, the atrocities committed by Topal Osman during the Koçgiri events, the bad events and victimisation are described, and this persecution is referred to Imam Husayn, who is again seen as the symbol of the oppressed in the Alevi faith. As in the examples given above, Alişer frequently used the themes of the Alevism element and also the data related to the events of the period in his poems.

== Legacy ==
"Alişer, who had studied and analysed the Kurdish language excellently, composed many national poems in Kurdish and performed these poems to the people with his beautiful saz, arousing the national feelings of the tribes, stirring the high aspirations of the Kurds in his words and saz, and crying the sorrows and sorrows of the Kurds with his high spirit, words and saz."

— Mehmed Nuri Dersimi, Dersim in the History of Kurdistan, (1952)

The various narratives about Alişer; while this constitutes the basis of his description of a "charismatic people's leader", which refers to his intelligent, brave, artist, hero, warrior, and soldier aspects among the Kurds, on the other hand, in the official discourse – although attention is drawn to his positive features such as intelligence, courage, knowledge, and artistic personality – mischief, It was a reason for him to be mentioned with titles such as ringleader, rebel or a traitor. Alişer Efendi is also known as one of the symbolic figures of the 20th century Kurdish national movement, together with his wife, Zarife Xanım, who shared his life and the same sad fate with him.

== See also ==
- Koçgiri rebellion
- Kurdish nationalism
- Nureddin Pasha
- Nuri Dersimi
- Sebastatsi Murad
- Seyid Riza
- Topal Osman
- Vehib Pasha

== Sources ==
- Dersimi, Mehmed Nuri (1952). Kürdistan Tarihinde Dersim (in Turkish). Aleppo: Ani Matbaası. ISBN 975-6876-44-1.
- Olson, Robert W. (1989). The Emergence of Kurdish Nationalism and the Sheikh Said Rebellion, 1880–1925. University of Texas Press. ISBN 978-0-292-77619-7.
- Mango, Andrew (1999). Atatürk: The Biography of the Founder of Modern Turkey. John Murray. ISBN 978-0-7195-6592-2.
- Olson, Robert; Rumbold, Horace (1989). "The Koçgiri Kurdish rebellion in 1921 and the draft law for a proposed autonomy of Kurdistan". Oriente Moderno. 8 (69) (1/6): 41. doi:10.1163/22138617-0690106006. ISSN 0030-5472. JSTOR 25817079.
- Soileau, Dilek Kızıldağ (2018). "Koçgirili Alişer Efendi". In Bora, Tanıl; Yanık, Aybars (eds.). Kürt Tarihi ve Siyasetinden Portreler (in Turkish). İletişim Yayıncılık. ISBN 978-975-05-2529-2.
- Demir, Halim (2008). Milli Mücadele: Kuvay-ı Milliye - İttihatçılar ve Muhalifler (in Turkish). Ozan Yayıncılık. ISBN 9789944143219.
- Akçam, Taner (2007). A Shameful Act: The Armenian Genocide and the Question of Turkish Responsibility. Picador. ISBN 9781466832121.
