= Taşdelen =

Taşdelen is a Turkish word. It may refer to:

== People ==
- Cihan Tasdelen (born 1975), German football manager of Turkish descent
- Orhan Taşdelen (born 1987), Turkish footballer
- Reyhan Taşdelen (born 2007), Turkish Paralympian athlete

== Places ==
- Taşdelen, Uludere, a village in the Uludere District of Şırnak Province in Turkey
- Taşdelen, İmranlı, a village in the İmranlı District of Sivas Province in Turkey
