= Taşlıca =

Taşlıca may refer to:

== Place ==
- Taşlıca, a former name of the city of Pljevlja, Montenegro
- Neta, Cyprus, a village in the Famagusta District of Cyprus, called Taşlıca in Turkish
- Taşlıca, Akseki, a village in the Akseki District of Antalya Province
- Taşlıca, Artvin, a village in the Artvin Central District of Artvin Province
- Taşlıca, Dereli, a village in the Dereli District of Giresun Province
- Taşlıca, Fatsa, a village in the Fatsa District of Ordu Province
- Taşlıca, İmranlı, a village in the İmranlı District of Sivas Province
- Taşlıca, İspir, a village in the İspir District of Erzurum Province
- Taşlıca, Iğdır, a village in the Iğdır Central District of Iğdır Province
- Taşlıca, Kahta, a village in the Kâhta District of Adıyaman Province
- Taşlıca, Kızılcahamam, a village in the Kızılcahamam District of Ankara Province
- Taşlıca, Kızıltepe, a village in the Kızıltepe District of Mardin Province
- Taşlıca, Kürtün, a village in the Kürtün District of Gümüşhane Province
- Taşlıca, Marmaris, a village in the Marmaris District of Muğla Province
- Taşlıca, Niğde, a village in the Niğde Central District of Niğde Province
- Taşlıca, Ömerli, a village in the Ömerli District of Mardin Province
- Taşlıca, Reşadiye, a village in the Reşadiye District of Tokat Province
