= Susuzlar, Divriği =

Village in Sivas Province, Turkey

Susuzlar
- Village
- Location in Turkey Susuzlar (Turkey Central Anatolia)
- Coordinates: 39.507°N 37.855°E
- Country: Turkey
- Province: Sivas
- District: Divriği
- Population (2024): 50
- Time zone: UTC+3 (TRT)

Susuzlar is a village in the Divriği District of Sivas Province in Turkey. It is populated by Kurds and had a population of 50 in 2024.
