= Ekincik =

Ekincik may refer to the following places in Turkey:

- Ekincik, İmranlı
- Ekincik, Tosya
- Village in Hamur District
