= Karacahisar, İmranlı =

Village in Sivas Province, Turkey

Karacahisar
- Village
- Location in Turkey Karacahisar (Turkey Central Anatolia)
- Coordinates: 39.869°N 38.238°E
- Country: Turkey
- Province: Sivas
- District: İmranlı
- Population (2023): 67
- Time zone: UTC+3 (TRT)

Karacahisar is a village in the İmranlı District of Sivas Province in Turkey. It is populated by Kurds and had a population of 67 in 2023.
