= Karakuzulu, Divriği =

Village in Sivas Province, Turkey

Karakuzulu
- Village
- Location in Turkey Karakuzulu (Turkey Central Anatolia)
- Coordinates: 39.404°N 37.902°E
- Country: Turkey
- Province: Sivas
- District: Divriği
- Population (2023): 32
- Time zone: UTC+3 (TRT)

Karakuzulu is a village in the Divriği District of Sivas Province in Turkey. It is populated by Kurds and had a population of 32 in 2023.

== Notable people ==
- Müslüm Doğan
