= Karacaören, İmranlı =

Village in Sivas Province, Turkey

Karacaören
- Village
- Location in Turkey Karacaören (Turkey Central Anatolia)
- Coordinates: 39.729°N 38.115°E
- Country: Turkey
- Province: Sivas
- District: İmranlı
- Population (2023): 128
- Time zone: UTC+3 (TRT)

Karacaören is a village in the İmranlı District of Sivas Province in Turkey. It is populated by Kurds and had a population of 128 in 2023.
