= Höbek, Divriği =

Village in Sivas Province, Turkey

Höbek
- Village
- Location in Turkey Höbek (Turkey Central Anatolia)
- Coordinates: 39.314°N 37.863°E
- Country: Turkey
- Province: Sivas
- District: Divriği
- Population (2024): 143
- Time zone: UTC+3 (TRT)

Höbek is a village in the Divriği District of Sivas Province in Turkey. It is populated by Kurds and had a population of 143 in 2024.
