= Gürün District =

District of Sivas Province, Turkey

- District
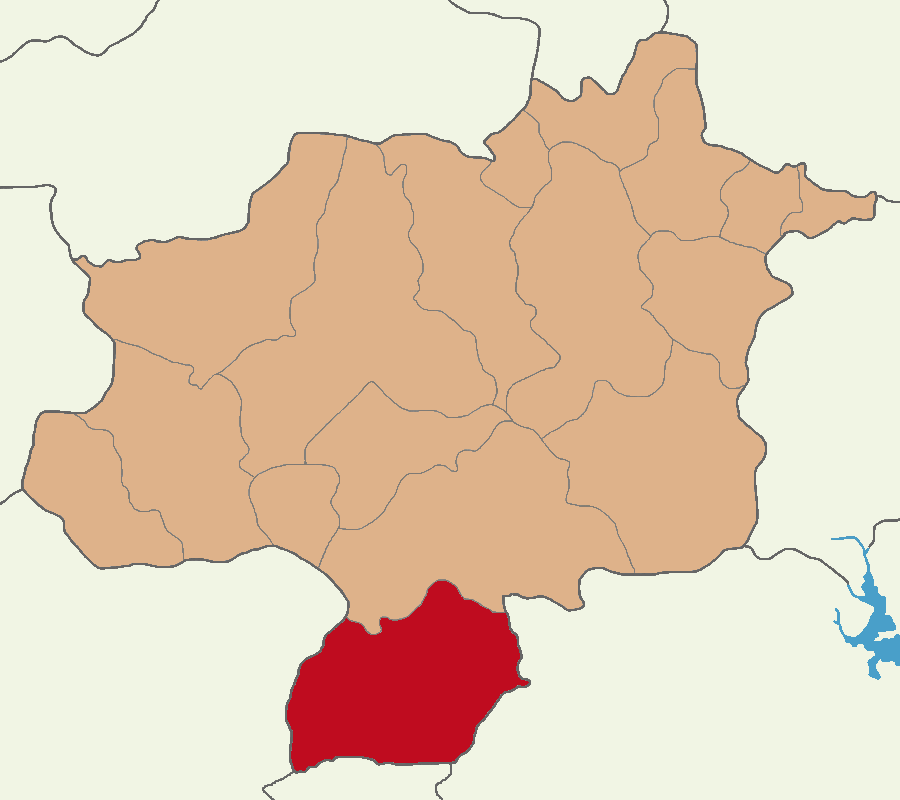
- Map showing Gürün District in Sivas Province

- Location in Turkey Gürün District (Turkey Central Anatolia)
- Coordinates: 38°43′N 37°17′E
- Country: Turkey
- Province: Sivas
- Seat: Gürün

Government
  - Kaymakam: Halil Yazıcı
- Area: 2,632 km^{2} (1,016 sq mi)
- Population (2022): 18,009
  - Density: 6.8/km^{2} (18/sq mi)
- Time zone: UTC+3 (TRT)
- Website: www.gurun.gov.tr

Gürün District is a district of the Sivas Province of Turkey. Its seat is the town of Gürün. Its area is 2,632 km^{2}, and its population is 18,009 (2022).

== Composition ==
There is one municipality in Gürün District:

- Gürün

There are 60 villages in Gürün District:

- Akdere
- Akpınar
- Ayvalı
- Bağlıçay
- Bahçeiçi
- Başören
- Beypınarı
- Böğrüdelik
- Bozhüyük
- Camiliyurt
- Çamlıca
- Çiçekyurt
- Davulhüyük
- Dayakpınar
- Deveçayırı
- Dürmepınar
- Erdoğan
- Eskibektaşlı
- Eskihamal
- Göbekören
- Gökçeyazı
- Güldede
- Güllübucak
- Güneş
- Hüyüklüyurt
- İncesu
- Kaledere
- Karadoruk
- Karahisar
- Karakuyu
- Karaören
- Karapınar
- Kaşköy
- Kavakköy
- Kayalar
- Kaynarca
- Kılıçdoğan
- Kındıralık
- Kızılburun
- Kızılören
- Kızılpınar
- Konakpınar
- Koyunlu
- Külahlı
- Kürkçü
- Mağara
- Mahkenli
- Osmandede
- Reşadiye
- Sarıca
- Sularbaşı
- Tepecik
- Yaylacık
- Yazyurdu
- Yelken
- Yenibektaşlı
- Yeşildere
- Yılanhüyük
- Yolgeçen
- Yuva
