= Yusufşeyh, Divriği =

Village in Sivas Province, Turkey

Yusufşeyh
- Village
- Location in Turkey Yusufşeyh (Turkey Central Anatolia)
- Coordinates: 39.409°N 37.666°E
- Country: Turkey
- Province: Sivas
- District: Divriği
- Population (2023): 46
- Time zone: UTC+3 (TRT)

Yusufşeyh is a village in the Divriği District of Sivas Province in Turkey. It is populated by Kurds of the Canbeg tribe and had a population of 46 in 2023.
