= Karaçayır, İmranlı =

Village in Sivas Province, Turkey

Karaçayır
- Village
- Location in Turkey Karaçayır (Turkey Central Anatolia)
- Coordinates: 39.870°N 38.238°E
- Country: Turkey
- Province: Sivas
- District: İmranlı
- Population (2023): 17
- Time zone: UTC+3 (TRT)

Karaçayır is a village in the İmranlı District of Sivas Province in Turkey. It is populated by Kurds and had a population of 17 in 2023.
