= Yukarıboğaz, İmranlı =

Village in Sivas Province, Turkey

Yukarıboğaz
- Village
- Location in Turkey Yukarıboğaz (Turkey Central Anatolia)
- Coordinates: 39.920°N 38.234°E
- Country: Turkey
- Province: Sivas
- District: İmranlı
- Population (2023): 24
- Time zone: UTC+3 (TRT)

Yukarıboğaz is a village in the İmranlı District of Sivas Province in Turkey. It is populated by Kurds and had a population of 24 in 2023.
