= Sinek, İmranlı =

Village in Sivas Province, Turkey

Sinek
- Village
- Location in Turkey Sinek (Turkey Central Anatolia)
- Coordinates: 39.776°N 38.378°E
- Country: Turkey
- Province: Sivas
- District: İmranlı
- Population (2023): 30
- Time zone: UTC+3 (TRT)

Sinek is a village in the İmranlı District of Sivas Province in Turkey. It is populated by Kurds and had a population of 30 in 2023.

== Geography ==
The village is 143 km from the Sivas provincial center and 35 km from the İmranlı district center.
