= Kapukaya, İmranlı =

Village in Sivas Province, Turkey

Kapukaya
- Village
- Location in Turkey Kapukaya (Turkey Central Anatolia)
- Coordinates: 39.751°N 38.014°E
- Country: Turkey
- Province: Sivas
- District: İmranlı
- Population (2023): 129
- Time zone: UTC+3 (TRT)

Kapukaya or Kapıkaya is a village in the İmranlı District of Sivas Province in Turkey. It is populated by Kurds and had a population of 129 in 2023.
