= Kayaburun, Divriği =

Village in Sivas Province, Turkey

Kayaburun
- Village
- Location in Turkey Kayaburun (Turkey Central Anatolia)
- Coordinates: 39.292°N 38.018°E
- Country: Turkey
- Province: Sivas
- District: Divriği
- Population (2023): 125
- Time zone: UTC+3 (TRT)

Kayaburun (Armenian: Odur) is a village in the Divriği District of Sivas Province in Turkey. It is populated by Kurds and Turks and had a population of 125 in 2023.

== History ==
According to Ottoman census records, the population of the village was Armenian in 1568 and remained Armenian until the Armenian genocide. The name "Odur" comes from Armenian and means "given by God." After the genocide, Turks and Kurds settled in the village.
