= Kılıçdoğan, Gürün =

Village in Sivas Province, Turkey

Kılıçdoğan
- Village
- Location in Turkey Kılıçdoğan (Turkey Central Anatolia)
- Coordinates: 38.922°N 37.517°E
- Country: Turkey
- Province: Sivas
- District: Gürün
- Population (2023): 83
- Time zone: UTC+3 (TRT)

Kılıçdoğan is a village in the Gürün District of Sivas Province in Turkey. It is populated by Kurds of the Atma tribe and had a population of 83 in 2023.
