= Ortakdaracık, İmranlı =

Village in Sivas Province, Turkey

Ortadarakcık
- Village
- Location in Turkey Ortadarakcık (Turkey Central Anatolia)
- Coordinates: 39.668°N 38.238°E
- Country: Turkey
- Province: Sivas
- District: İmranlı
- Population (2023): 63
- Time zone: UTC+3 (TRT)

Ortadarakcık is a village in the İmranlı District of Sivas Province in Turkey. It is populated by Kurds and had a population of 63 in 2023.
