= Türkyenice, İmranlı =

Village in Sivas Province, Turkey

Türkyenice
- Village
- Location in Turkey Türkyenice (Turkey Central Anatolia)
- Coordinates: 39.737°N 38.223°E
- Country: Turkey
- Province: Sivas
- District: İmranlı
- Population (2023): 20
- Time zone: UTC+3 (TRT)

Türkyenice is a village in the İmranlı District of Sivas Province in Turkey. It is populated by Turks and had a population of 20 in 2023.
