= Yenikent, İmranlı =

Village in Sivas Province, Turkey

Yenikent
- Village
- Location in Turkey Yenikent (Turkey Central Anatolia)
- Coordinates: 39°48′32″N 38°02′06″E
- Country: Turkey
- Province: Sivas
- District: İmranlı
- Population (2023): 30
- Time zone: UTC+3 (TRT)

Yenikent is a village in the İmranlı District of Sivas Province in Turkey. It is populated by Kurds and had a population of 30 in 2023.
