= Kızılmezraa, İmranlı =

Village in Sivas Province, Turkey

Kızılmezraa
- Village
- Location in Turkey Kızılmezraa (Turkey Central Anatolia)
- Coordinates: 39.895°N 38.302°E
- Country: Turkey
- Province: Sivas
- District: İmranlı
- Population (2023): 49
- Time zone: UTC+3 (TRT)

Kızılmezraa is a village in the İmranlı District of Sivas Province in Turkey. It is populated by Kurds and had a population of 49 in 2023.
