= Sandal, İmranlı =

Village in Sivas Province, Turkey

Sandal
- Village
- Location in Turkey Sandal (Turkey Central Anatolia)
- Coordinates: 39.795°N 38.018°E
- Country: Turkey
- Province: Sivas
- District: İmranlı
- Population (2023): 33
- Time zone: UTC+3 (TRT)

Sandal is a village in the İmranlı District of Sivas Province in Turkey. It is populated by Kurds and had a population of 33 in 2023.

== Geography ==
The village is 148 km from the Sivas provincial center and 24 km from the İmranlı district center.
