= Kuzköy, İmranlı =

Village in Sivas Province, Turkey

Kuzköy
- Village
- Location in Turkey Kuzköy (Turkey Central Anatolia)
- Coordinates: 39.854°N 38.343°E
- Country: Turkey
- Province: Sivas
- District: İmranlı
- Population (2023): 26
- Time zone: UTC+3 (TRT)

Kuzköy is a village in the İmranlı District of Sivas Province in Turkey. It is populated by Kurds and had a population of 26 in 2023.
