= Mahkenli, Gürün =

Village in Sivas Province, Turkey

Mahkenli
- Village
- Location within Turkey Location within Turkey Central Anatolia
- Coordinates: 38.737°N 37.436°E
- Country: Turkey
- Province: Sivas
- District: Gürün
- Population (2023): 135
- Time zone: UTC+3 (TRT)

Mahkenli, formerly Ağaçlı, is a village in the Gürün District of Sivas Province in Turkey. It is populated by Kurds and had a population of 135 in 2023.
