= Yürektaşı, İmranlı =

Village in Sivas Province, Turkey

Yürektaşı
- Village
- Location in Turkey Yürektaşı (Turkey Central Anatolia)
- Coordinates: 39.604°N 38.263°E
- Country: Turkey
- Province: Sivas
- District: İmranlı
- Population (2023): 70
- Time zone: UTC+3 (TRT)

Yürektaşı is a village in the İmranlı District of Sivas Province in Turkey. It is populated by Turks and had a population of 70 in 2023.

== Geography ==
The village is located 175 km from the Sivas city center and 70 km from the İmranlı district center.
