= Sırçalı, Divriği =

Village in Sivas Province, Turkey

Sırcalı
- Village
- Location in Turkey Sırcalı (Turkey Central Anatolia)
- Coordinates: 39.398°N 37.719°E
- Country: Turkey
- Province: Sivas
- District: Divriği
- Population (2023): 33
- Time zone: UTC+3 (TRT)

Sırcalı is a village in the Divriği District of Sivas Province in Turkey. It is populated by Kurds of the Kurmeş tribe and had a population of 33 in 2023.
