= Yelken, Gürün =

Village in Sivas Province, Turkey

Yelken
- Village
- Location in Turkey Yelken (Turkey Central Anatolia)
- Coordinates: 38.647°N 37.311°E
- Country: Turkey
- Province: Sivas
- District: Gürün
- Population (2023): 79
- Time zone: UTC+3 (TRT)

Yelken is a village in the Gürün District of Sivas Province in Turkey. It is populated by Kurds of the Sinemili tribe and had a population of 79 in 2023.
