= Konakpınar, Gürün =

Village in Sivas Province, Turkey

Konakpınar
- Village
- Location within Turkey Location within Turkey Central Anatolia
- Coordinates: 38.904°N 37.296°E
- Country: Turkey
- Province: Sivas
- District: Gürün
- Population (2023): 71
- Time zone: UTC+3 (TRT)

Konakpınar is a village in the Gürün District of Sivas Province in Turkey. It is populated by Kurds and had a population of 71 in 2023.
