= Ortaköy, Divriği =

Village in Sivas Province, Turkey

Ortaköy
- Village
- Location in Turkey Ortaköy (Turkey Central Anatolia)
- Coordinates: 39.214°N 38.317°E
- Country: Turkey
- Province: Sivas
- District: Divriği
- Population (2023): 23
- Time zone: UTC+3 (TRT)

Ortaköy is a village in the Divriği District of Sivas Province in Turkey. It is populated by Kurds of the Canbeg tribe and had a population of 23 in 2023.
