= Topallar, İmranlı =

Village in Sivas Province, Turkey

Topallar
- Village
- Location in Turkey Topallar (Turkey Central Anatolia)
- Coordinates: 39.826°N 38.059°E
- Country: Turkey
- Province: Sivas
- District: İmranlı
- Population (2023): 9
- Time zone: UTC+3 (TRT)

Topallar is a village in the İmranlı District of Sivas Province in Turkey. It is populated by Kurds and had a population of 9 in 2023.

== Geography ==
The village is 115 km from the Sivas provincial center and 20 km from the İmranlı district center.
