= Karakuyu, Gürün =

Village in Sivas Province, Turkey

Karakuyu
- Village
- Location in Turkey Karakuyu (Turkey Central Anatolia)
- Coordinates: 38.672°N 37.126°E
- Country: Turkey
- Province: Sivas
- District: Gürün
- Population (2023): 108
- Time zone: UTC+3 (TRT)

Karakuyu is a village in the Gürün District of Sivas Province in Turkey. It is populated by Kurds of the Atma and Sinemili tribes and had a population of 108 in 2023.
