= Uluçayır, Divriği =

Village in Sivas Province, Turkey

Uluçayır
- Village
- Location in Turkey Uluçayır (Turkey Central Anatolia)
- Coordinates: 39.211°N 37.983°E
- Country: Turkey
- Province: Sivas
- District: Divriği
- Population (2023): 30
- Time zone: UTC+3 (TRT)

Uluçayır (Kurdish: Vazildan) is a village in the Divriği District of Sivas Province in Turkey. It is populated by Kurds of the Şadiyan tribe and had a population of 30 in 2023.
