= Yazılı, İmranlı =

Village in Sivas Province, Turkey

Yazılı
- Village
- Location in Turkey Yazılı (Turkey Central Anatolia)
- Coordinates: 39.771°N 38.000°E
- Country: Turkey
- Province: Sivas
- District: İmranlı
- Population (2023): 20
- Time zone: UTC+3 (TRT)

Yazılı is a village in the İmranlı District of Sivas Province in Turkey. It is populated by Kurds and had a population of 20 in 2023.
