= Yünören, İmranlı =

Village in Sivas Province, Turkey

Yünören
- Village
- Location in Turkey Yünören (Turkey Central Anatolia)
- Coordinates: 39.711°N 38.182°E
- Country: Turkey
- Province: Sivas
- District: İmranlı
- Population (2023): 65
- Time zone: UTC+3 (TRT)

Yünören is a village in the İmranlı District of Sivas Province in Turkey. It is populated by Kurds and had a population of 65 in 2023.

== Geography ==
The village is located 138 km from the Sivas city center and 35 km from the İmranlı district center.
