= İmranlı District =

District of Sivas Province, Turkey

- District
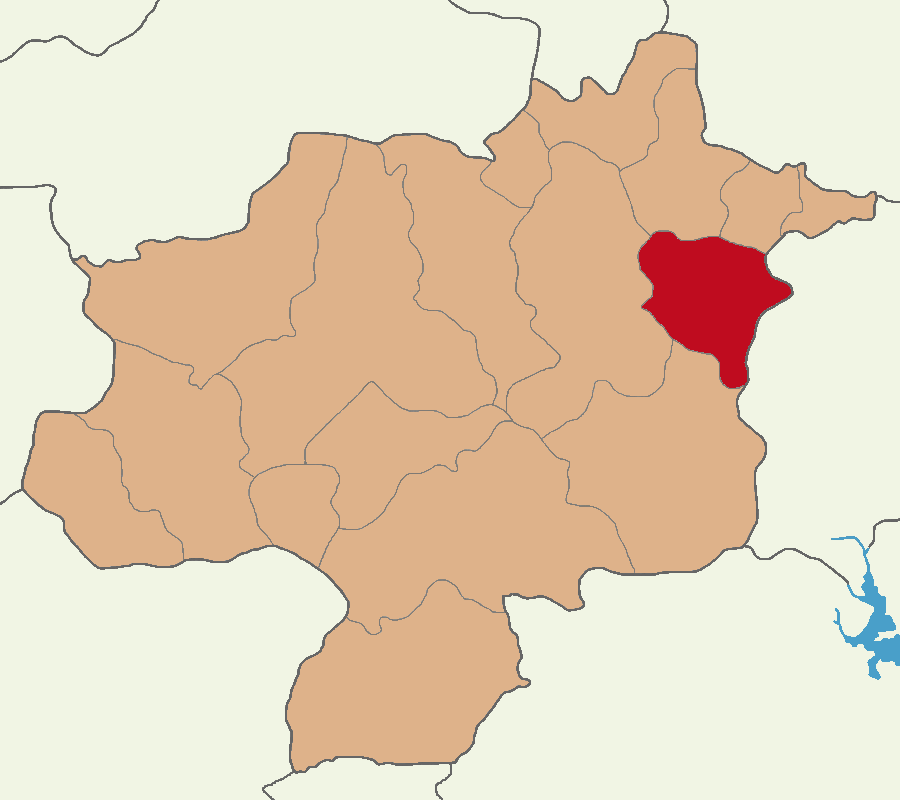
- Map showing İmranlı District in Sivas Province

- Location in Turkey İmranlı District (Turkey Central Anatolia)
- Coordinates: 39°53′N 38°08′E
- Country: Turkey
- Province: Sivas
- Seat: İmranlı

Government
  - Kaymakam: Abdulkadir Zengin
- Area: 1,292 km^{2} (499 sq mi)
- Population (2023): 9,091
  - Density: 7.0/km^{2} (18/sq mi)
- Time zone: UTC+3 (TRT)
- Website: www.imranli.gov.tr

İmranlı District is a district of the Sivas Province of Turkey. Its seat is the town of İmranlı. Its area is 1,292 km^{2}, and its population is 9,091 (2023). It became a district on 1 January 1948.

== Demographics ==
İmranlı District is populated by Kurds and Turks with Kurds comprising a slim majority. Most villages are moreover populated by Alevi Kurds and a small amount of villages are Alevi and Sunni Turkish. İmranlı town has a Turkish majority with a significant Kurdish minority.

== Composition ==
There is one municipality in İmranlı District:

- İmranlı

There are 100 villages in İmranlı District:

- Akçakale
- Akkaya
- Alacahacı
- Altınca
- Ardıçalan
- Arık
- Aşağıboğaz
- Aşağıçulha
- Aşağışeyhli
- Atlıca
- Avşar
- Aydın
- Aydoğan
- Bağyazı
- Bahadun
- Bahtiyar
- Bardaklı
- Başlıca
- Becek
- Beğendik
- Boğanak
- Boğazören
- Borular
- Bulgurluk
- Celaldamı
- Cerit
- Çalıyurt
- Çukuryurt
- Dağyurdu
- Darıseki
- Delice
- Demirtaş
- Dereköy
- Doğançal
- Ekincik
- Erdemşah
- Eskidere
- Eskikapumahmut
- Eskikeşlik
- Gelenli
- Gelintarla
- Gökçebel
- Gökdere
- Görünmezkale
- Güven
- Haliller
- Kapukaya
- Kapumahmut
- Karaboğaz
- Karacahisar
- Karacaören
- Karaçayır
- Karahüseyin
- Karapınar
- Karataş
- Karlık
- Kasaplar
- Kavalcık
- Kemreli
- Kerimoğlu
- Kevenli
- Kılıçköy
- Kılıçlar
- Kızılmezraa
- Kızıltepe
- Koçgediği
- Koruköy
- Koyunkaya
- Körabbas
- Kuzköy
- Madenköy
- Ortakdaracık
- Ortaköy
- Piredede
- Refik
- Sandal
- Sinek
- Söğütlü
- Taşdelen
- Taşlıça
- Toklucak
- Topallar
- Toptaş
- Tuzözü
- Türkkeşlik
- Türkyenice
- Uyanık
- Uzuntemür
- Yakayeri
- Yapraklıpınar
- Yazıkavka
- Yazılı
- Yenikent
- Yeniköy
- Yoncabayırı
- Yozyatağı
- Yukarboğaz
- Yukarıçulha
- Yünören
- Yürektaşı

== Population ==
Historical population

Year	Pop.	±% p.a.
1950	28,040	—
1955	29,198	+0.81%
1960	31,405	+1.47%
1965	32,253	+0.53%
1970	31,722	−0.33%
1975	30,364	−0.87%
1980	29,657	−0.47%

Year	Pop.	±% p.a.
1985	27,595	−1.43%
1990	21,530	−4.84%
1997	13,015	−6.94%
2007	7,532	−5.32%
2012	7,882	+0.91%
2017	6,705	−3.18%
2022	7,002	+0.87%

Source: Population censuses (1950-1997) and TÜIK (2007-2022)
