= Reşadiye, Gürün =

Village in Sivas Province, Turkey

Mahkenli
- Village
- Location in Turkey Mahkenli (Turkey Central Anatolia)
- Coordinates: 38.839°N 37.175°E
- Country: Turkey
- Province: Sivas
- District: Gürün
- Population (2023): 25
- Time zone: UTC+3 (TRT)

Reşadiye is a village in the Gürün District of Sivas Province in Turkey. It is populated by Kurds and had a population of 25 in 2023.
