= Yuva, Divriği =

Village in Sivas Province, Turkey

Yuva
- Village
- Location in Turkey Yuva (Turkey Central Anatolia)
- Coordinates: 39.483°N 37.834°E
- Country: Turkey
- Province: Sivas
- District: Divriği
- Population (2023): 43
- Time zone: UTC+3 (TRT)

Yuva is a village in the Divriği District of Sivas Province in Turkey. It is populated by Kurds of the Ginîyan tribe and had a population of 43 in 2023.
