= Kavakköy, Gürün =

Village in Sivas Province, Turkey

Kavakköy
- Village
- Location in Turkey Kavakköy (Turkey Central Anatolia)
- Coordinates: 38.655°N 37.223°E
- Country: Turkey
- Province: Sivas
- District: Gürün
- Population (2023): 143
- Time zone: UTC+3 (TRT)

Kavakköy is a village in the Gürün District of Sivas Province in Turkey. It is populated by Kurds and by Turks and had a population of 143 in 2023.
