= Yazıkavak, İmranlı =

Village in Sivas Province, Turkey

Yazıkavak
- Village
- Location in Turkey Yazıkavak (Turkey Central Anatolia)
- Coordinates: 39.890°N 38.248°E
- Country: Turkey
- Province: Sivas
- District: İmranlı
- Population (2023): 30
- Time zone: UTC+3 (TRT)

Yazıkavak is a village in the İmranlı District of Sivas Province in Turkey. It is populated by Kurds and had a population of 30 in 2023.
