= Yeşilyol, Divriği =

Village in Sivas Province, Turkey

Yeşilyol
- Village
- Location in Turkey Yeşilyol (Turkey Central Anatolia)
- Coordinates: 39.185°N 38.286°E
- Country: Turkey
- Province: Sivas
- District: Divriği
- Population (2023): 83
- Time zone: UTC+3 (TRT)

Yeşilyol (Kurdish: Daregen) is a village in the Divriği District of Sivas Province in Turkey. It is populated by Kurds and had a population of 83 in 2023.
