= Kılıçköy, İmranlı =

Village in Sivas Province, Turkey

Kılıçköy
- Village
- Location in Turkey Kılıçköy (Turkey Central Anatolia)
- Coordinates: 39.864°N 38.009°E
- Country: Turkey
- Province: Sivas
- District: İmranlı
- Population (2023): 173
- Time zone: UTC+3 (TRT)

Kılıçköy is a village in the İmranlı District of Sivas Province in Turkey. It is populated by Kurds and had a population of 173 in 2023.
