= Toklucak, İmranlı =

Village in Sivas Province, Turkey

Toklucak
- Village
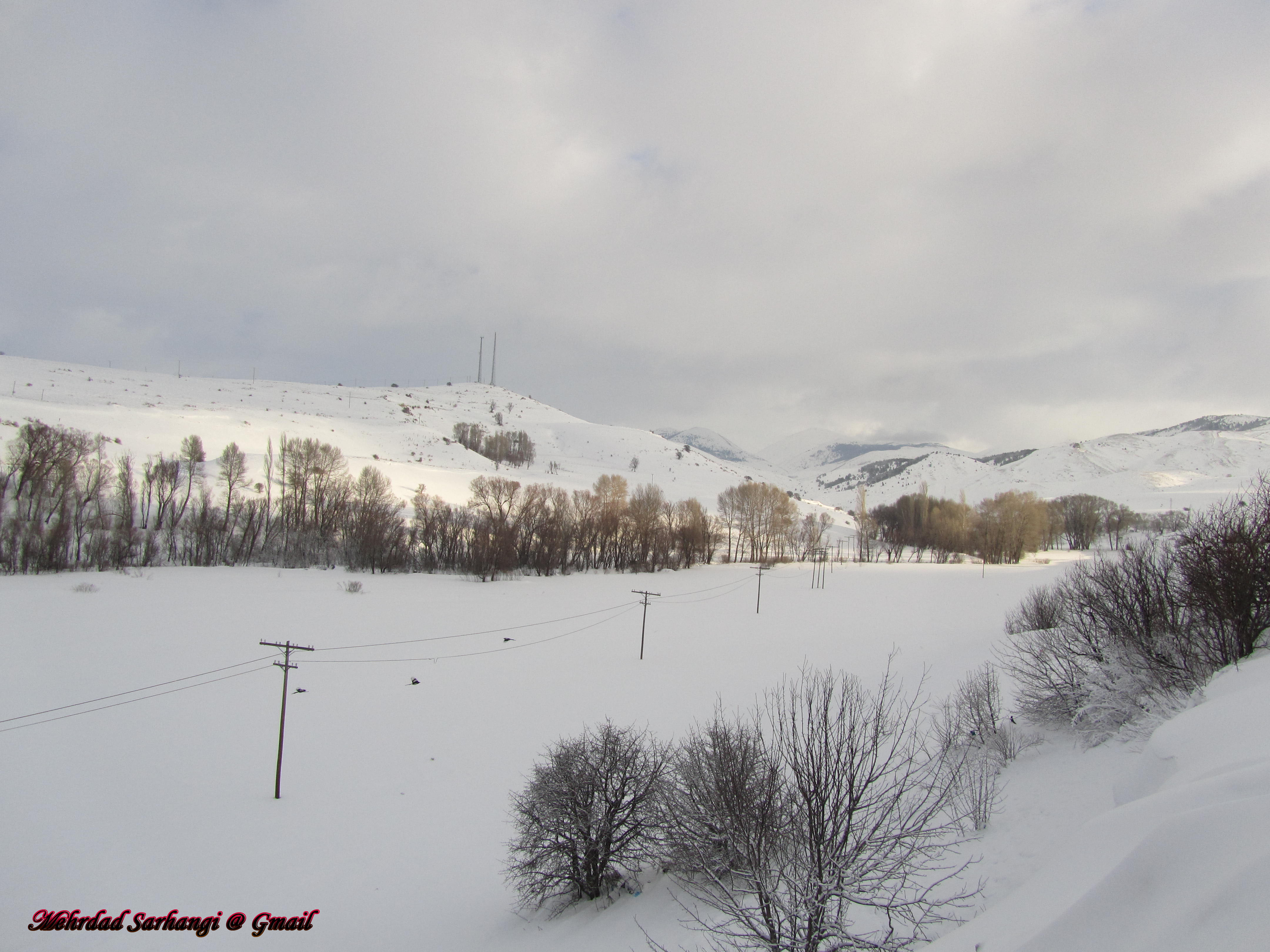
- Surroundings

- Location within Turkey Location within Turkey Central Anatolia
- Coordinates: 39.845°N 38.274°E
- Country: Turkey
- Province: Sivas
- District: İmranlı
- Population (2023): 69
- Time zone: UTC+3 (TRT)

Toklucak is a village in the İmranlı District of Sivas Province in Turkey. It is populated by Kurds and had a population of 69 in 2023.

== Geography ==
The village is 123 km from the Sivas provincial center and 21 km from the İmranlı district center.
