= Madenköy, İmranlı =

Village in Sivas Province, Turkey

Madenköy
- Village
- Location in Turkey Madenköy (Turkey Central Anatolia)
- Coordinates: 39.952°N 38.031°E
- Country: Turkey
- Province: Sivas
- District: İmranlı
- Population (2023): 123
- Time zone: UTC+3 (TRT)

Madenköy (Kurdish: Meden) is a village in the İmranlı District of Sivas Province in Turkey. It is populated by Kurds and had a population of 123 in 2023.
