= Uzuntemür, İmranlı =

Village in Sivas Province, Turkey

Uzuntemür
- Village
- Location in Turkey Uzuntemür (Turkey Central Anatolia)
- Coordinates: 39.930°N 38.043°E
- Country: Turkey
- Province: Sivas
- District: İmranlı
- Population (2023): 36
- Time zone: UTC+3 (TRT)

Uzuntemür is a village in the İmranlı District of Sivas Province in Turkey. It is populated by Kurds and had a population of 36 in 2023.

== Geography ==
The village is 118 km from the Sivas provincial center and 12 km from the İmranlı district center.
