= Karapınar, İmranlı =

Village in Sivas Province, Turkey

Karapınar
- Village
- Location in Turkey Karapınar (Turkey Central Anatolia)
- Coordinates: 39.811°N 38.307°E
- Country: Turkey
- Province: Sivas
- District: İmranlı
- Population (2023): 44
- Time zone: UTC+3 (TRT)

Karapınar is a village in the İmranlı District of Sivas Province in Turkey. It is populated by Kurds and had a population of 44 in 2023.
