= Haliller, İmranlı =

Village in Sivas Province, Turkey

Haliller
- Village
- Location in Turkey Haliller (Turkey Central Anatolia)
- Coordinates: 39.761°N 38.135°E
- Country: Turkey
- Province: Sivas
- District: İmranlı
- Population (2023): 99
- Time zone: UTC+3 (TRT)

Haliller is a village in the İmranlı District of Sivas Province in Turkey. It is populated by Kurds and had a population of 99 in 2023.
