= Kaynarca, Gürün =

Village in Sivas Province, Turkey

Kaynarca
- Village
- Location in Turkey Kaynarca (Turkey Central Anatolia)
- Coordinates: 38.763°N 36.976°E
- Country: Turkey
- Province: Sivas
- District: Gürün
- Population (2023): 44
- Time zone: UTC+3 (TRT)

Kaynarca is a village in the Gürün District of Sivas Province in Turkey. It is populated by Kurds of the Sinemili tribe and had a population of 44 in 2023.
