= Ovacık, Divriği =

Village in Sivas Province, Turkey

Ovacık
- Village
- Location in Turkey Ovacık (Turkey Central Anatolia)
- Coordinates: 39.531°N 37.915°E
- Country: Turkey
- Province: Sivas
- District: Divriği
- Population (2023): 113
- Time zone: UTC+3 (TRT)

Ovacık is a village in the Divriği District of Sivas Province in Turkey. It is populated by Kurds and had a population of 113 in 2023.
