= Kerimoğlu, İmranlı =

Village in Sivas Province, Turkey

Kerimoğlu
- Village
- Location in Turkey Kerimoğlu (Turkey Central Anatolia)
- Coordinates: 39.872°N 38.258°E
- Country: Turkey
- Province: Sivas
- District: İmranlı
- Population (2023): 56
- Time zone: UTC+3 (TRT)

Kerimoğlu is a village in the İmranlı District of Sivas Province in Turkey. It is populated by Kurds and had a population of 56 in 2023.
