= Ürük, Divriği =

Village in Sivas Province, Turkey

Ürük
- Village
- Location within Turkey Location within Turkey Central Anatolia
- Coordinates: 39.190°N 37.969°E
- Country: Turkey
- Province: Sivas
- District: Divriği
- Population (2023): 65
- Time zone: UTC+3 (TRT)

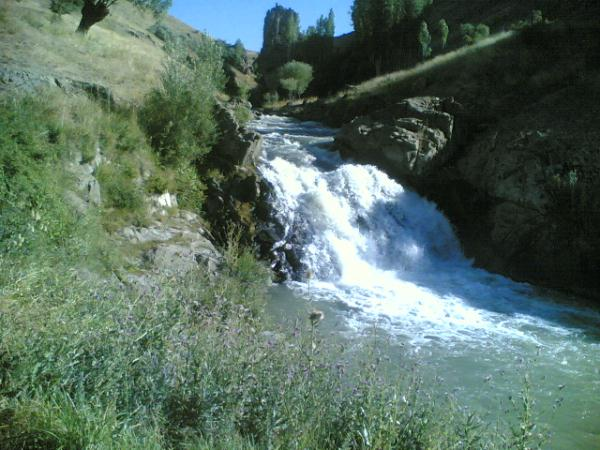
Çangal Waterfall, located in the village

Ürük is a village in the Divriği District of Sivas Province in Turkey. It is populated by Kurds of the Şadiyan tribe and had a population of 65 in 2023.
