= Piredede, İmranlı =

Village in Sivas Province, Turkey

Piredede
- Village
- Location in Turkey Piredede (Turkey Central Anatolia)
- Coordinates: 39.859°N 38.215°E
- Country: Turkey
- Province: Sivas
- District: İmranlı
- Population (2023): 40
- Time zone: UTC+3 (TRT)

Piredede is a village in the İmranlı District of Sivas Province in Turkey. It is populated by Kurds and Turks and had a population of 40 in 2023.

== Geography ==
The village is 113 km from the Sivas provincial center and 11 km from the İmranlı district center.
