= Söğütlü, İmranlı =

Village in Sivas Province, Turkey

Söğütlü
- Village
- Location in Turkey Söğütlü (Turkey Central Anatolia)
- Coordinates: 39.695°N 38.230°E
- Country: Turkey
- Province: Sivas
- District: İmranlı
- Population (2023): 23
- Time zone: UTC+3 (TRT)

Söğütlü is a village in the İmranlı District of Sivas Province in Turkey. It is populated by Turks and had a population of 23 in 2023.
