= Kavaklısu, Divriği =

Village in Sivas Province, Turkey

Kavaklısu
- Village
- Location in Turkey Kavaklısu (Turkey Central Anatolia)
- Coordinates: 39.243°N 38.044°E
- Country: Turkey
- Province: Sivas
- District: Divriği
- Population (2023): 69
- Time zone: UTC+3 (TRT)

Kavaklısu is a village in the Divriği District of Sivas Province in Turkey. It is populated by Kurds of the Şadiyan tribe and had a population of 69 in 2023.
