= Kavalcık, İmranlı =

Village in Sivas Province, Turkey

Kavalcık
- Village
- Location in Turkey Kavalcık (Turkey Central Anatolia)
- Coordinates: 39.773°N 38.046°E
- Country: Turkey
- Province: Sivas
- District: İmranlı
- Population (2023): 22
- Time zone: UTC+3 (TRT)

Kavalcık is a village in the İmranlı District of Sivas Province in Turkey. It is populated by Kurds and had a population of 22 in 2023.
