= Kevenli, İmranlı =

Village in Sivas Province, Turkey

Kevenli
- Village
- Location in Turkey Kevenli (Turkey Central Anatolia)
- Coordinates: 39.824°N 38.257°E
- Country: Turkey
- Province: Sivas
- District: İmranlı
- Population (2023): 46
- Time zone: UTC+3 (TRT)

Kevenli is a village in the İmranlı District of Sivas Province in Turkey. It is populated by Kurds and had a population of 46 in 2023.
