= Yukarıçulha, İmranlı =

Village in Sivas Province, Turkey

Yukarıçulha
- Village
- Location in Turkey Yukarıçulha (Turkey Central Anatolia)
- Coordinates: 39.902°N 38.118°E
- Country: Turkey
- Province: Sivas
- District: İmranlı
- Population (2023): 39
- Time zone: UTC+3 (TRT)

Yukarıçulha is a village in the İmranlı District of Sivas Province in Turkey. It is populated by Kurds and had a population of 39 in 2023.
