= Kaşköy, Gürün =

Village in Sivas Province, Turkey

Kaşköy
- Village
- Location within Turkey Location within Turkey Central Anatolia
- Coordinates: 38.754°N 37.077°E
- Country: Turkey
- Province: Sivas
- District: Gürün
- Population (2023): 43
- Time zone: UTC+3 (TRT)

Kaşköy is a village in the Gürün District of Sivas Province in Turkey. It is populated by Kurds and had a population of 43 in 2023.
