= Kasaplar, İmranlı =

Village in Sivas Province, Turkey

Kasaplar
- Village
- Location in Turkey Kasaplar (Turkey Central Anatolia)
- Coordinates: 39.856°N 38.430°E
- Country: Turkey
- Province: Sivas
- District: İmranlı
- Population (2023): 84
- Time zone: UTC+3 (TRT)

Kasaplar is a village in the İmranlı District of Sivas Province in Turkey. It is populated by Kurds and had a population of 84 in 2023.
