= Ortaköy, İmranlı =

Village in Sivas Province, Turkey

Ortaköy
- Village
- Location in Turkey Ortaköy (Turkey Central Anatolia)
- Coordinates: 39.871°N 38.331°E
- Country: Turkey
- Province: Sivas
- District: İmranlı
- Population (2023): 105
- Time zone: UTC+3 (TRT)

Ortaköy is a village in the İmranlı District of Sivas Province in Turkey. It is populated by Kurds and had a population of 105 in 2023.
