= Tepehan, Divriği =

Village in Sivas Province, Turkey

Tepehan
- Village
- Location in Turkey Tepehan (Turkey Central Anatolia)
- Coordinates: 39.520°N 37.798°E
- Country: Turkey
- Province: Sivas
- District: Divriği
- Population (2023): 39
- Time zone: UTC+3 (TRT)

Tepehan is a village in the Divriği District of Sivas Province in Turkey. It is populated by Kurds of Ginîyan tribe and had a population of 39 in 2023.
