= Koyunlu, Gürün =

Village in Sivas Province, Turkey

Koyunlu
- Village
- Location in Turkey Koyunlu (Turkey Central Anatolia)
- Coordinates: 38.898°N 37.083°E
- Country: Turkey
- Province: Sivas
- District: Gürün
- Population (2023): 98
- Time zone: UTC+3 (TRT)

Koyunlu (Kurdish: Kellaş) is a village in the Gürün District of Sivas Province in Turkey. It is populated by Kurds and had a population of 98 in 2023.
