= Külahlı, Gürün =

Village in Sivas Province, Turkey

Külahlı
- Village
- Location in Turkey Külahlı (Turkey Central Anatolia)
- Coordinates: 38.825°N 37.429°E
- Country: Turkey
- Province: Sivas
- District: Gürün
- Population (2023): 48
- Time zone: UTC+3 (TRT)

Külahlı is a village in the Gürün District of Sivas Province in Turkey. It is populated by Kurds and had a population of 48 in 2023.
