= Yapraklıpınar, İmranlı =

Village in Sivas Province, Turkey

Ortaköy
- Village
- Location in Turkey Ortaköy (Turkey Central Anatolia)
- Coordinates: 39.799°N 38.081°E
- Country: Turkey
- Province: Sivas
- District: İmranlı
- Population (2023): 13
- Time zone: UTC+3 (TRT)

Yapraklıpınar is a village in the İmranlı District of Sivas Province in Turkey. It is populated by Kurds and had a population of 13 in 2023.
