= Körabbas, İmranlı =

Village in Sivas Province, Turkey

Körabbas
- Village
- Location in Turkey Körabbas (Turkey Central Anatolia)
- Coordinates: 39.807°N 38.087°E
- Country: Turkey
- Province: Sivas
- District: İmranlı
- Population (2023): 14
- Time zone: UTC+3 (TRT)

Körabbas is a village in the İmranlı District of Sivas Province in Turkey. It is populated by Kurds and had a population of 14 in 2023.
