= Yoncabayırı, İmranlı =

Village in Sivas Province, Turkey

Yoncabayırı
- Village
- Location in Turkey Yoncabayırı (Turkey Central Anatolia)
- Coordinates: 39.639°N 38.273°E
- Country: Turkey
- Province: Sivas
- District: İmranlı
- Population (2023): 160
- Time zone: UTC+3 (TRT)

Yoncabayırı is a village in the İmranlı District of Sivas Province in Turkey. It is populated by Kurds and had a population of 160 in 2023.
