= Kapumahmut, İmranlı =

Village in Sivas Province, Turkey

Kapumahmut
- Village
- Location in Turkey Kapumahmut (Turkey Central Anatolia)
- Coordinates: 39.908°N 38.208°E
- Country: Turkey
- Province: Sivas
- District: İmranlı
- Population (2023): 32
- Time zone: UTC+3 (TRT)

Kapumahmut is a village in the İmranlı District of Sivas Province in Turkey. It is populated by Kurds and had a population of 32 in 2023.
