= Yaylacık, Gürün =

Village in Sivas Province, Turkey

Yaylacık
- Village
- Location in Turkey Yaylacık (Turkey Central Anatolia)
- Coordinates: 38.717°N 37.064°E
- Country: Turkey
- Province: Sivas
- District: Gürün
- Population (2023): 35
- Time zone: UTC+3 (TRT)

Yaylacık is a village in the Gürün District of Sivas Province in Turkey. It is populated by Kurds and had a population of 35 in 2023.
