= Koçgediği, İmranlı =

Village in Sivas Province, Turkey

Koçgediği
- Village
- Location in Turkey Koçgediği (Turkey Central Anatolia)
- Coordinates: 39.721°N 38.209°E
- Country: Turkey
- Province: Sivas
- District: İmranlı
- Population (2023): 35
- Time zone: UTC+3 (TRT)

Koçgediği is a village in the İmranlı District of Sivas Province in Turkey. It is populated by Kurds and had a population of 35 in 2023.
