= Karadoruk, Gürün =

Village in Sivas Province, Turkey

Karadoruk
- Village
- Location in Turkey Karadoruk (Turkey Central Anatolia)
- Coordinates: 38.869°N 37.359°E
- Country: Turkey
- Province: Sivas
- District: Gürün
- Population (2023): 143
- Time zone: UTC+3 (TRT)

Karadoruk is a village in the Gürün District of Sivas Province in Turkey. It is populated by Kurds of the Atma tribe and had a population of 143 in 2023.
