= Kılıçlar, İmranlı =

Village in Sivas Province, Turkey

Kılıçlar
- Village
- Location in Turkey Kılıçlar (Turkey Central Anatolia)
- Coordinates: 39.929°N 38.195°E
- Country: Turkey
- Province: Sivas
- District: İmranlı
- Population (2023): 91
- Time zone: UTC+3 (TRT)

Kılıçlar is a village in the İmranlı District of Sivas Province in Turkey. It is populated by Kurds and had a population of 91 in 2023.
