= Koyunkaya, İmranlı =

Village in Sivas Province, Turkey

Koyunkaya
- Village
- Location in Turkey Koyunkaya (Turkey Central Anatolia)
- Coordinates: 39.838°N 38.297°E
- Country: Turkey
- Province: Sivas
- District: İmranlı
- Population (2023): 111
- Time zone: UTC+3 (TRT)

Koyunkaya is a village in the İmranlı District of Sivas Province in Turkey. It is populated by Kurds and had a population of 111 in 2023.
