= Yuva, Gürün =

Village in Sivas Province, Turkey

Yuva
- Village
- Location in Turkey Yuva (Turkey Central Anatolia)
- Coordinates: 38.792°N 37.416°E
- Country: Turkey
- Province: Sivas
- District: Gürün
- Population (2023): 55
- Time zone: UTC+3 (TRT)

Yuva is a village in the Gürün District of Sivas Province in Turkey. It is populated by Kurds and Turks and had a population of 55 in 2023.
