= Eskibektaşlı, Gürün =

Village in Sivas Province, Turkey

Eskibektaşlı
- Village
- Location in Turkey Eskibektaşlı (Turkey Central Anatolia)
- Coordinates: 38.940°N 37.339°E
- Country: Turkey
- Province: Sivas
- District: Gürün
- Population (2023): 62
- Time zone: UTC+3 (TRT)

Eskibektaşlı is a village in the Gürün District of Sivas Province in Turkey. It is populated by Kurds and had a population of 62 in 2023.
