= Çamurlu, Divriği =

Village in Sivas Province, Turkey

Çamurlu
- Village
- Location in Turkey Çamurlu (Turkey Central Anatolia)
- Coordinates: 39.417°N 37.710°E
- Country: Turkey
- Province: Sivas
- District: Divriği
- Population (2023): 94
- Time zone: UTC+3 (TRT)

Çamurlu is a village in the Divriği District of Sivas Province in Turkey. It is populated by Kurds of the Canbeg and Kurmeş tribes and had a population of 94 in 2023.
