= Başlıca, İmranlı =

Village in Sivas Province, Turkey

Başlıca
- Village
- Location in Turkey Başlıca (Turkey Central Anatolia)
- Coordinates: 39.816°N 38.025°E
- Country: Turkey
- Province: Sivas
- District: İmranlı
- Population (2023): 28
- Time zone: UTC+3 (TRT)

Başlıca is a village in the İmranlı District of Sivas Province in Turkey. It is populated by Kurds and had a population of 28 in 2023.

== History ==
The name of the village is recorded as Pîrikan, which means "ancestors" in Kurdish, in the records of 1928.

== Geography ==
The village is located 131 km from the center of Sivas province and 20 km from the center of İmranlı district.
