= Çakırağa, Divriği =

Village in Sivas Province, Turkey

Çakırağa
- Village
- Location in Turkey Çakırağa (Turkey Central Anatolia)
- Coordinates: 39.412°N 37.829°E
- Country: Turkey
- Province: Sivas
- District: Divriği
- Population (2023): 45
- Time zone: UTC+3 (TRT)

Çakırağa is a village in the Divriği District of Sivas Province in Turkey. It is populated by Turks and had a population of 45 in 2023.
