= Borular, İmranlı =

Village in Sivas Province, Turkey

Borular
- Village
- Location in Turkey Borular (Turkey Central Anatolia)
- Coordinates: 39.948°N 38.093°E
- Country: Turkey
- Province: Sivas
- District: İmranlı
- Population (2023): 68
- Time zone: UTC+3 (TRT)

Borular is a village in the İmranlı District of Sivas Province in Turkey. It is populated by Kurds and had a population of 68 in 2023.

== History ==
The name of the village is recorded as Boriyan in the records from 1928.

== Geography ==
The village is 123 km away from the Sivas city center and 15 km away from the İmranlı district center.
