= Handere, Divriği =

Village in Sivas Province, Turkey

Handere
- Village
- Location in Turkey Handere (Turkey Central Anatolia)
- Coordinates: 39.235°N 38.272°E
- Country: Turkey
- Province: Sivas
- District: Divriği
- Population (2023): 29
- Time zone: UTC+3 (TRT)

Handere is a village in the Divriği District of Sivas Province in Turkey. It is populated by Kurds and had a population of 29 in 2023.
