= Bardaklı, İmranlı =

Village in Sivas Province, Turkey

Bardaklı
- Village
- Location in Turkey Bardaklı (Turkey Central Anatolia)
- Coordinates: 39.736°N 38.187°E
- Country: Turkey
- Province: Sivas
- District: İmranlı
- Population (2023): 32
- Time zone: UTC+3 (TRT)

Bardaklı (Kurdish: Heremî) is a village in the İmranlı District of Sivas Province in Turkey. It is populated by Kurds and had a population of 32 in 2023.

== History ==
Some written information about the village is found in the Avârız registers of 1642. At that time, the settlement, referred to as "Haramlı," was part of the central sub-district of Kuruçay in the Erzurum Province and had 13 Muslim households subject to avârız tax. The village's name was recorded as Harami in the records of 1916.

== Geography ==
The village is located 123 km from the Sivas city center and 24 km from the İmranlı district center.
