= Avşar, İmranlı =

Village in Sivas Province, Turkey

Avşar
- Village
- Location in Turkey Avşar (Turkey Central Anatolia)
- Coordinates: 39.714°N 38.194°E
- Country: Turkey
- Province: Sivas
- District: İmranlı
- Population (2023): 47
- Time zone: UTC+3 (TRT)

Avşar is a village in the İmranlı District of Sivas Province in Turkey. It is populated by Turks and had a population of 47 in 2023.

== Geography ==
The village is located 133 km from the Sivas city center and 32 km from the İmranlı district center.
