= Güvenkaya, Divriği =

Village in Sivas Province, Turkey

Güvenkaya
- Village
- Location in Turkey Güvenkaya (Turkey Central Anatolia)
- Coordinates: 39.328°N 37.735°E
- Country: Turkey
- Province: Sivas
- District: Divriği
- Population (2023): 37
- Time zone: UTC+3 (TRT)

Güvenkaya is a village in the Divriği District of Sivas Province in Turkey. It is populated by Kurds of the Canbeg tribe and had a population of 37 in 2023.
