= Darıseki, İmranlı =

Village in Sivas Province, Turkey

Darıseki
- Village
- Location in Turkey Darıseki (Turkey Central Anatolia)
- Coordinates: 39.667°N 38.313°E
- Country: Turkey
- Province: Sivas
- District: İmranlı
- Population (2023): 95
- Time zone: UTC+3 (TRT)

Darıseki is a village in the İmranlı District of Sivas Province in Turkey. It is populated by Turks and had a population of 95 in 2023.
