= Gökçeharman, Divriği =

Village in Sivas Province, Turkey

Gökçeharman
- Village
- Location in Turkey Gökçeharman (Turkey Central Anatolia)
- Coordinates: 39.332°N 37.802°E
- Country: Turkey
- Province: Sivas
- District: Divriği
- Population (2023): 31
- Time zone: UTC+3 (TRT)

Gökçeharman (Kurdish: Omeran) is a village in the Divriği District of Sivas Province in Turkey. It is populated by Kurds of the Hormek, Kurmeş, Kurêşan and Lolan tribes and had a population of 31 in 2023.
