= Deveçayırı, Gürün =

Village in Sivas Province, Turkey

Devecayiri
- Village
- Location in Turkey Devecayiri (Turkey Central Anatolia)
- Coordinates: 38.667°N 36.889°E
- Country: Turkey
- Province: Sivas
- District: Gürün
- Population (2023): 37
- Time zone: UTC+3 (TRT)

Deveçayırı is a village in the Gürün District of Sivas Province in Turkey. It is populated by Kurds of the Sinemili tribe and had a population of 37 in 2023.
