= Dereköy, İmranlı =

Village in Sivas Province, Turkey

Dereköy
- Village
- Location in Turkey Dereköy (Turkey Central Anatolia)
- Coordinates: 39.853°N 38.049°E
- Country: Turkey
- Province: Sivas
- District: İmranlı
- Population (2023): 48
- Time zone: UTC+3 (TRT)

Dereköy is a village in the İmranlı District of Sivas Province in Turkey. It is populated by Kurds and had a population of 48 in 2023.
