= Bağlıçay, Gürün =

Village in Sivas Province, Turkey

Bağlıçay
- Village
- Location in Turkey Bağlıçay (Turkey Central Anatolia)
- Coordinates: 38.805°N 37.474°E
- Country: Turkey
- Province: Sivas
- District: Gürün
- Population (2023): 115
- Time zone: UTC+3 (TRT)

Bağlıçay is a village in the Gürün District of Sivas Province in Turkey. It is populated by Kurds of the Alhas and Kurecik tribes and had a population of 115 in 2023.
