= Başören, Gürün =

Village in Sivas Province, Turkey

Başören
- Village
- Location in Turkey Başören (Turkey Central Anatolia)
- Coordinates: 38.609°N 36.966°E
- Country: Turkey
- Province: Sivas
- District: Gürün
- Population (2023): 80
- Time zone: UTC+3 (TRT)

Başören is a village in the Gürün District of Sivas Province in Turkey. It is populated by Kurds and had a population of 80 in 2023.
