= Akbaba, Divriği =

Village in Sivas Province, Turkey

Akbaba
- Village
- Location in Turkey Akbaba (Turkey Central Anatolia)
- Coordinates: 39°25′55″N 37°38′06″E
- Country: Turkey
- Province: Sivas
- District: Divriği
- Population (2023): 15
- Time zone: UTC+3 (TRT)

Akbaba is a village in the Divriği District of Sivas Province in Turkey. It is populated by Kurds of the Ginîyan tribe and had a population of 15 in 2023.
