= Celaldamı, İmranlı =

Village in Sivas Province, Turkey

Celaldamı
- Village
- Location in Turkey Celaldamı (Turkey Central Anatolia)
- Coordinates: 39.791°N 37.992°E
- Country: Turkey
- Province: Sivas
- District: İmranlı
- Population (2023): 12
- Time zone: UTC+3 (TRT)

Celaldamı is a village in the İmranlı District of Sivas Province in Turkey. It is populated by Kurds and had a population of 12 in 2023.

== History ==
The village has had the same name since 1928.

== Geography ==
The village is located 139 km from the center of Sivas province and 27 km from the center of İmranlı district.
