= Aşağıçulha, İmranlı =

Village in Sivas Province, Turkey

Aşağıçulha
- Village
- Location in Turkey Aşağıçulha (Turkey Central Anatolia)
- Coordinates: 39.892°N 38.124°E
- Country: Turkey
- Province: Sivas
- District: İmranlı
- Population (2023): 56
- Time zone: UTC+3 (TRT)

Aşağıçulha is a village in the İmranlı District of Sivas Province in Turkey. It is populated by Kurds and had a population of 56 in 2023.

== Geography ==
The village is located 106 km from the Sivas city center and 2 km from the İmranlı district center.
