= Güven, İmranlı =

Village in Sivas Province, Turkey

Güven
- Village
- Location in Turkey Güven (Turkey Central Anatolia)
- Coordinates: 39°42′26″N 38°21′04″E
- Country: Turkey
- Province: Sivas
- District: İmranlı
- Population (2023): 77
- Time zone: UTC+3 (TRT)

Güven is a village in the İmranlı District of Sivas Province in Turkey. It is populated by Turks and had a population of 77 in 2023.
