= Eskidere, İmranlı =

Village in Sivas Province, Turkey

Eskidere
- Village
- Location in Turkey Eskidere (Turkey Central Anatolia)
- Coordinates: 39.811°N 38.126°E
- Country: Turkey
- Province: Sivas
- District: İmranlı
- Population (2023): 41
- Time zone: UTC+3 (TRT)

Eskidere (Kurdish: Kaxnut) is a village in the İmranlı District of Sivas Province in Turkey. It is populated by Kurds and had a population of 41 in 2023.
