= Gökdere, İmranlı =

Village in Sivas Province, Turkey

Gökdere
- Village
- Location in Turkey Gökdere (Turkey Central Anatolia)
- Coordinates: 39.830°N 38.306°E
- Country: Turkey
- Province: Sivas
- District: İmranlı
- Population (2023): 19
- Time zone: UTC+3 (TRT)

Gökdere is a village in the İmranlı District of Sivas Province in Turkey. It is populated by Kurds and had a population of 19 in 2023.
