= Akçakale, İmranlı =

Village in Sivas Province, Turkey

Akçakale
- Village
- Location in Turkey Akçakale (Turkey Central Anatolia)
- Coordinates: 39.759°N 38.146°E
- Country: Turkey
- Province: Sivas
- District: İmranlı
- Population (2023): 15
- Time zone: UTC+3 (TRT)

Akçakale is a village in the İmranlı District of Sivas Province in Turkey. It is populated by Kurds and had a population of 15 in 2023.

== Geography ==
The village is 128 km away from the center of Sivas province and 25 km away from the center of İmranlı district.
