= Çamlık, Divriği =

Village in Sivas Province, Turkey

Çamlık
- Village
- Location in Turkey Çamlık (Turkey Central Anatolia)
- Coordinates: 39.577°N 38.0088°E
- Country: Turkey
- Province: Sivas
- District: Divriği
- Population (2023): 49
- Time zone: UTC+3 (TRT)

Çamlık is a village in the Divriği District of Sivas Province in Turkey. It is populated by Kurds and had a population of 49 in 2023.
