= Eskikapumahmut, İmranlı =

Village in Sivas Province, Turkey

Eskikapımahmut
- Village
- Location in Turkey Eskikapımahmut (Turkey Central Anatolia)
- Coordinates: 39.954°N 38.182°E
- Country: Turkey
- Province: Sivas
- District: İmranlı
- Population (2023): 47
- Time zone: UTC+3 (TRT)

Eskikapumahmut or Eskikapımahmut is a village in the İmranlı District of Sivas Province in Turkey. It is populated by Kurds and had a population of 47 in 2023.
