= Gezey, Divriği =

Village in Sivas Province, Turkey

Gezey
- Village
- Location in Turkey Gezey (Turkey Central Anatolia)
- Coordinates: 39.374°N 38.251°E
- Country: Turkey
- Province: Sivas
- District: Divriği
- Population (2023): 18
- Time zone: UTC+3 (TRT)

Gezey is a village in the Divriği District of Sivas Province in Turkey. It is populated by Kurds of the Reşwan tribe and had a population of 18 in 2023.
