= Akmeşe, Divriği =

Village in Sivas Province, Turkey

Akmeşe
- Village
- Location in Turkey Akmeşe (Turkey Central Anatolia)
- Coordinates: 39.465°N 38.015°E
- Country: Turkey
- Province: Sivas
- District: Divriği
- Population (2023): 100
- Time zone: UTC+3 (TRT)

Akmeşe is a village in the Divriği District of Sivas Province in Turkey.

== Demographics ==
It is populated by Kurds and Turks and had a population of 100 in 2023.
