= Cerit, İmranlı =

Village in Sivas Province, Turkey

Cerit
- Village
- Location in Turkey Cerit (Turkey Central Anatolia)
- Coordinates: 39.769°N 38.076°E
- Country: Turkey
- Province: Sivas
- District: İmranlı
- Population (2023): 81
- Time zone: UTC+3 (TRT)

Cerit is a village in the İmranlı District of Sivas Province in Turkey. It is populated by Kurds and had a population of 81 in 2023.

== Geography ==
The village is located 140 km from the center of Sivas province and 28 km from the center of İmranlı district.
