= Akıncılar, Adıyaman Province =

Town in Adıyaman Province, Turkey

Akıncılar
- Municipality
- Location in Turkey
- Coordinates: 37.764°N 38.823°E
- Country: Turkey
- Province: Adıyaman
- District: Kâhta
- Population (2021): 1,658
- Time zone: UTC+3 (TRT)

Akıncılar (Kurdish: Toxarîs) is a town (belde) and municipality in the Kâhta District, Adıyaman Province, Turkey. The town is populated by Kurds of the Gewozî, Kawan and Mirdêsan tribes and had a population of 1,658 in 2021.
