= Çayözü, Divriği =

Village in Sivas Province, Turkey

Çayözü
- Village
- Location in Turkey Çayözü (Turkey Central Anatolia)
- Coordinates: 39.596°N 38.183°E
- Country: Turkey
- Province: Sivas
- District: Divriği
- Population (2023): 70
- Time zone: UTC+3 (TRT)

Çayözü is a village in the Divriği District of Sivas Province in Turkey. It is populated by Kurds and Turks and had a population of 70 in 2023.
