= Görünmezkale, İmranlı =

Village in Sivas Province, Turkey

Görünmezkale
- Village
- Location in Turkey Görünmezkale (Turkey Central Anatolia)
- Coordinates: 39.887°N 38.312°E
- Country: Turkey
- Province: Sivas
- District: İmranlı
- Population (2023): 30
- Time zone: UTC+3 (TRT)

Görünmezkale is a village in the İmranlı District of Sivas Province in Turkey. It is populated by Kurds and had a population of 30 in 2023.
