= Bahadun, İmranlı =

Village in Sivas Province, Turkey

Bahadun
- Village
- Location in Turkey Bahadun (Turkey Central Anatolia)
- Coordinates: 39.751°N 38.197°E
- Country: Turkey
- Province: Sivas
- District: İmranlı
- Population (2023): 71
- Time zone: UTC+3 (TRT)

Bahadun is a village in the İmranlı District of Sivas Province in Turkey. It is populated by Kurds and had a population of 71 in 2023.

== Geography ==
The village is 128 km away from Sivas city center and 25 km away from İmranlı district center.
