= Eskikeşlik, İmranlı =

Village in Sivas Province, Turkey

Eskikeşlik
- Village
- Location in Turkey Eskikeşlik (Turkey Central Anatolia)
- Coordinates: 39.906°N 37.967°E
- Country: Turkey
- Province: Sivas
- District: İmranlı
- Population (2023): 70
- Time zone: UTC+3 (TRT)

Eskikeşlik is a village in the İmranlı District of Sivas Province in Turkey. It is populated by Kurds and had a population of 70 in 2023.
