= Altınca, İmranlı =

Village in Sivas Province, Turkey

Altınca
- Village
- Location in Turkey Altınca (Turkey Central Anatolia)
- Coordinates: 39.896°N 38.160°E
- Country: Turkey
- Province: Sivas
- District: İmranlı
- Population (2023): 27
- Time zone: UTC+3 (TRT)

Altınca (Kurdish: Cefan) is a village in the İmranlı District of Sivas Province in Turkey. It is populated by Kurds and had a population of 27 in 2023.

== Geography ==
The village is located 108 km from the Sivas city center and 5 km from the İmranlı district center.
