= Çitme, Divriği =

Village in Sivas Province, Turkey

Çitme
- Village
- Location in Turkey Çitme (Turkey Central Anatolia)
- Coordinates: 39.516°N 38.233°E
- Country: Turkey
- Province: Sivas
- District: Divriği
- Population (2023): 19
- Time zone: UTC+3 (TRT)

Çitme is a village in the Divriği District of Sivas Province in Turkey. It is populated by Turks and had a population of 19 in 2023.
