= Dürmepınar, Gürün =

Village in Sivas Province, Turkey

Dürmepınar
- Village
- Location in Turkey Dürmepınar (Turkey Central Anatolia)
- Coordinates: 38.958°N 37.376°E
- Country: Turkey
- Province: Sivas
- District: Gürün
- Population (2023): 60
- Time zone: UTC+3 (TRT)

Dürmepınar is a village in the Gürün District of Sivas Province in Turkey. It is populated by Kurds of the Atma tribe and had a population of 60 in 2023.
