= Akıncılar, Sivas =

Akıncılar
- Municipality
- Location in Turkey Akıncılar (Turkey Central Anatolia)
- Coordinates: 40°04′49″N 38°20′50″E
- Country: Turkey
- Province: Sivas
- District: Akıncılar

Government
  - Mayor: Hasan Şen (AKP)
- Elevation: 1,051 m (3,448 ft)
- Population (2022): 2,441
- Time zone: UTC+3 (TRT)
- Postal code: 58550
- Area code: 0346
- Website: www.akincilar.bel.tr

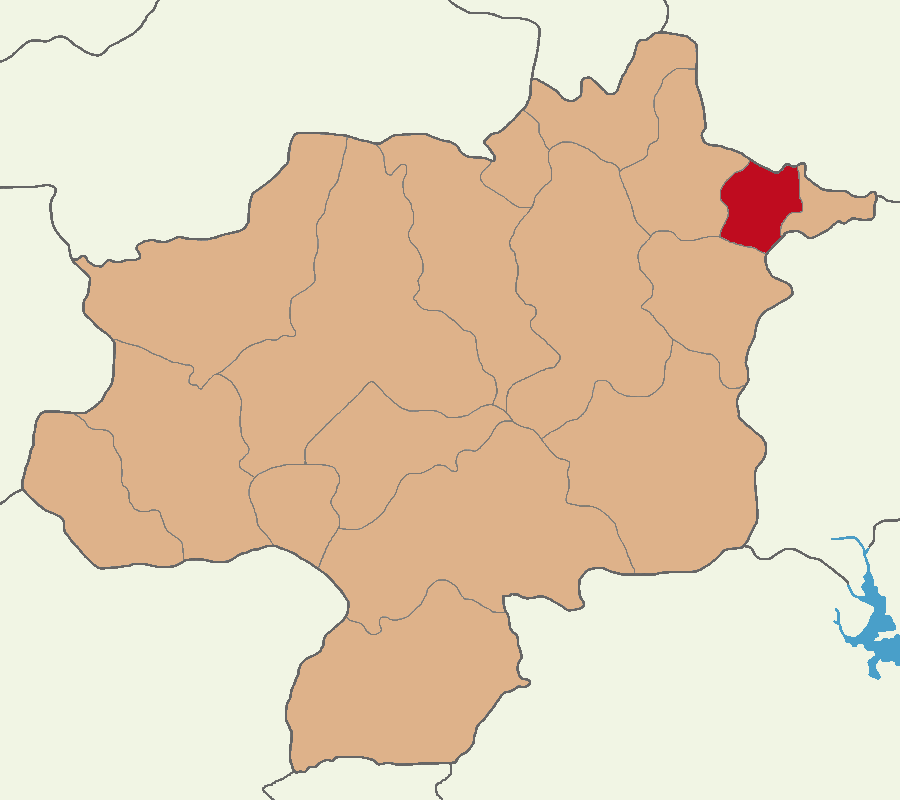
Sivas location Akıncılar

Akıncılar is a town in Sivas Province of Turkey. It is the seat of Akıncılar District. Its population is 2,441 (2022). The mayor is Hasan Şen (AKP).
