= Davulhüyük, Gürün =

Village in Sivas Province, Turkey

Davulhüyük
- Village
- Location in Turkey Davulhüyük (Turkey Central Anatolia)
- Coordinates: 38.811°N 37.139°E
- Country: Turkey
- Province: Sivas
- District: Gürün
- Population (2023): 218
- Time zone: UTC+3 (TRT)

Davulhüyük is a village in the Gürün District of Sivas Province in Turkey. It is populated by Kurds and had a population of 218 in 2023.
