= Erdemşah, İmranlı =

Village in Sivas Province, Turkey

Erdemşah
- Village
- Location in Turkey Erdemşah (Turkey Central Anatolia)
- Coordinates: 39.748°N 38.276°E
- Country: Turkey
- Province: Sivas
- District: İmranlı
- Population (2023): 15
- Time zone: UTC+3 (TRT)

Erdemşah is a village in the İmranlı District of Sivas Province in Turkey. It is populated by Turks and had a population of 15 in 2023.
