= Delice, İmranlı =

Village in Sivas Province, Turkey

Delice
- Village
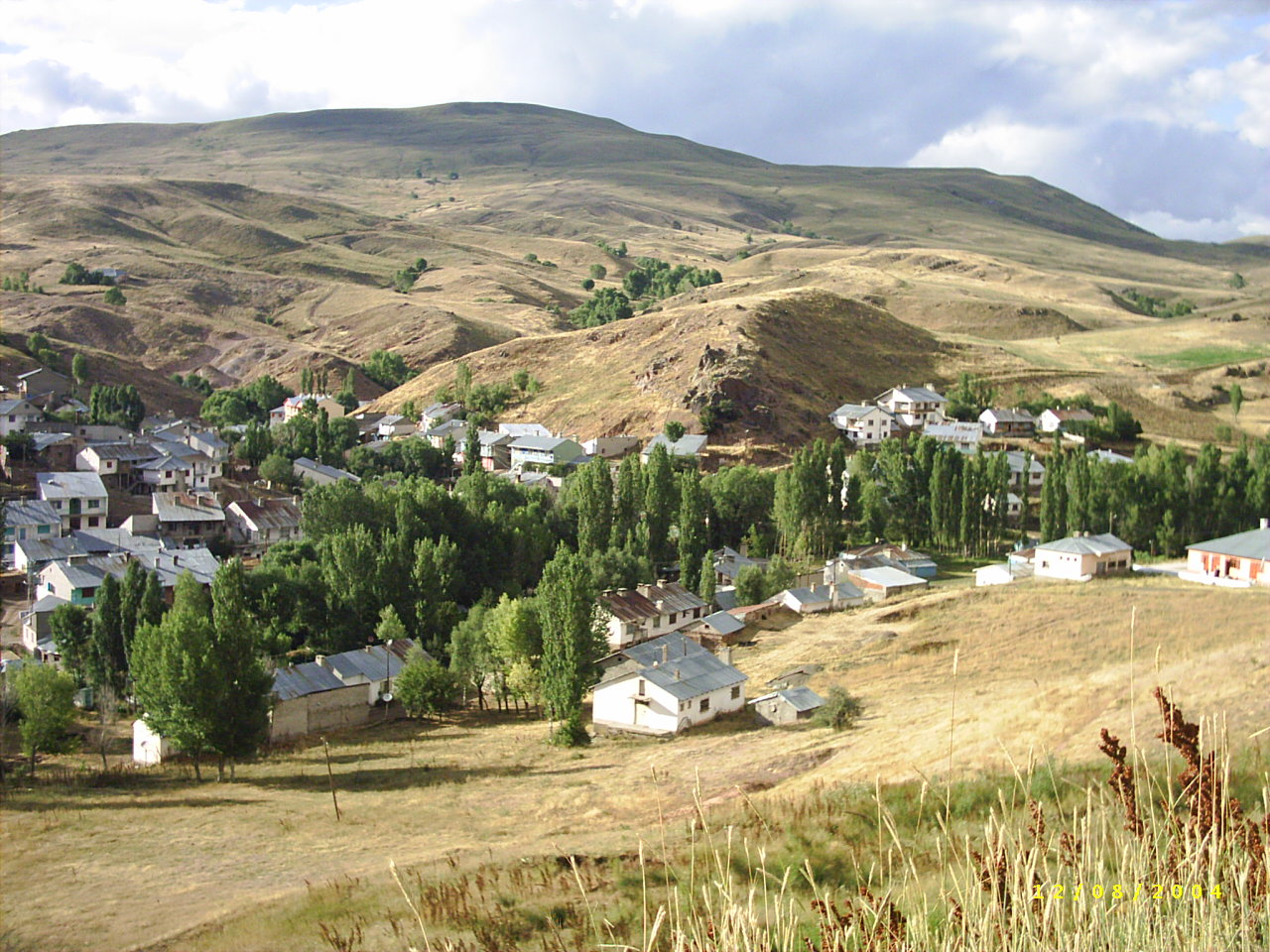

- Location within Turkey Location within Turkey Central Anatolia
- Coordinates: 39.896°N 38.095°E
- Country: Turkey
- Province: Sivas
- District: İmranlı
- Population (2023): 136
- Time zone: UTC+3 (TRT)

Delice is a village in the İmranlı District of Sivas Province in Turkey. It is populated by Kurds and had a population of 136 in 2023.
