= Gökçebel, İmranlı =

Village in Sivas Province, Turkey

Gökçebel
- Village
- Location in Turkey Gökçebel (Turkey Central Anatolia)
- Coordinates: 39.949°N 38.222°E
- Country: Turkey
- Province: Sivas
- District: İmranlı
- Population (2023): 78
- Time zone: UTC+3 (TRT)

Gökçebel is a village in the İmranlı District of Sivas Province in Turkey. It is populated by Kurds and had a population of 78 in 2023.
