= Boğazören, İmranlı =

Village in Sivas Province, Turkey

Boğazören
- Village
- Location in Turkey Boğazören (Turkey Central Anatolia)
- Coordinates: 39.819°N 38.178°E
- Country: Turkey
- Province: Sivas
- District: İmranlı
- Population (2023): 110
- Time zone: UTC+3 (TRT)

Boğazören is a village in the İmranlı District of Sivas Province in Turkey. It is populated by Kurds and had a population of 110 in 2023.

== History ==
The name of the village is recorded as Boğazviran in the records of 1928.

== Geography ==
The village is located 128 km from the center of Sivas province and 12 km from the center of İmranlı district.
