= Becek, İmranlı =

Village in Sivas Province, Turkey

Becek
- Village
- Location in Turkey Becek (Turkey Central Anatolia)
- Coordinates: 39.839°N 38.2034°E
- Country: Turkey
- Province: Sivas
- District: İmranlı
- Population (2023): 15
- Time zone: UTC+3 (TRT)

Becek is a village in the İmranlı District of Sivas Province in Turkey. It is populated by Kurds and had a population of 15 in 2023.

== History ==
The village has had the same name since 1928.

== Geography ==
The village is located 121 km from the center of Sivas province and 21 km from the center of İmranlı district.
