= Boğanak, İmranlı =

Village in Sivas Province, Turkey

Boğanak
- Village
- Location in Turkey Boğanak (Turkey Central Anatolia)
- Coordinates: 39.709°N 38.234°E
- Country: Turkey
- Province: Sivas
- District: İmranlı
- Population (2023): 64
- Time zone: UTC+3 (TRT)

Boğanak is a village in the İmranlı District of Sivas Province in Turkey. It is populated by Turks and had a population of 64 in 2023.

== History ==
The village has had the same name since 1522. Some written information about the village is found in the Avârız registers dated 1642. In these records, the village is mentioned as "Buğanek," a village in the central district of Kuruçay in Erzurum Province, where 6 Muslim households subject to the avârız tax lived.

== Geography ==
The village is located 133 km from the center of Sivas province and 32 km from the center of İmranlı district.
