= Çukuröz, Divriği =

Village in Sivas Province, Turkey

Çukuröz
- Village
- Location in Turkey Çukuröz (Turkey Central Anatolia)
- Coordinates: 39.231°N 38.118°E
- Country: Turkey
- Province: Sivas
- District: Divriği
- Population (2023): 35
- Time zone: UTC+3 (TRT)

Çukuröz is a village in the Divriği District of Sivas Province in Turkey. It is populated by Turks and had a population of 35 in 2023.
