= Bahtiyar, Divriği =

Village in Sivas Province, Turkey

Bahtiyar
- Village
- Location in Turkey Bahtiyar (Turkey Central Anatolia)
- Coordinates: 39.241°N 37.982°E
- Country: Turkey
- Province: Sivas
- District: Divriği
- Population (2023): 21
- Time zone: UTC+3 (TRT)

Bahtiyar is a village in the Divriği District of Sivas Province in Turkey. It is populated by Turks and had a population of 21 in 2023.
