= Doğançal, İmranlı =

Village in Sivas Province, Turkey

Doğançal
- Village
- Location in Turkey Doğançal (Turkey Central Anatolia)
- Coordinates: 39.880°N 38.066°E
- Country: Turkey
- Province: Sivas
- District: İmranlı
- Population (2023): 26
- Time zone: UTC+3 (TRT)

Doğançal is a village in the İmranlı District of Sivas Province in Turkey. It is populated by Kurds and had a population of 26 in 2023.
