= Aydın, İmranlı =

Village in Sivas Province, Turkey

Aydın
- Village
- Location in Turkey Aydın (Turkey Central Anatolia)
- Coordinates: 39.830°N 38.420°E
- Country: Turkey
- Province: Sivas
- District: İmranlı
- Population (2023): 29
- Time zone: UTC+3 (TRT)

Aydın is a village in the İmranlı District of Sivas Province in Turkey. It is populated by Kurds and had a population of 29 in 2023.

== Geography ==
The village is located 148 km from the Sivas city center and 36 km from the İmranlı district center.
