= Çalıyurt, İmranlı =

Village in Sivas Province, Turkey

Çalıyurt
- Village
- Location in Turkey Çalıyurt (Turkey Central Anatolia)
- Coordinates: 39.946°N 38.254°E
- Country: Turkey
- Province: Sivas
- District: İmranlı
- Population (2023): 124
- Time zone: UTC+3 (TRT)

Çalıyurt (Kurdish: Çalurd) is a village in the İmranlı District of Sivas Province in Turkey. It is populated by Kurds and had a population of 124 in 2023.

== History ==
The village has had the same name since 1916.

== Geography ==
The village is 133 km away from the Sivas city center and 33 km away from the İmranlı district center.
