= Cihan Tasdelen =

German footballer and manager

Personal information
- Date of birth: 6 June 1975 (age 51)
- Place of birth: Hamm, Germany
- Position: Defender

Senior career*
Years	Team	Apps	(Gls)
1993–1994	İstanbulspor		

Managerial career
- 1995–1999: İstanbulspor
- 2000–2004: Preußen Münster U17
- 2004–2007: Preußen Münster U19
- 2007–2011: Preußen Münster II
- 2013–2019: Preußen Münster U19
- 2016: Preußen Münster
- 2020–2021: Eintracht Rheine
- * Club domestic league appearances and goals

Cihan Tasdelen (born 6 June 1975) is a German football manager and a former player.

== Managerial career ==
Tasdelen started his managerial career in 1995 as a coach for İstanbulspor. In 2000, he joined the youth team of Preußen Münster, and 2007 he became the second team manager until 2011. In 2013, he returned as the youth team manager. In October 2016, Tasdelen became the interim manager of the first team, playing in the 3. Liga, after Horst Steffen had been sacked. He managed two matches for the club, the first being a 7–0 win in the Westphalian Cup against fifth-division side SpVgg Erkenschwick on 9 October 2016. His second and final match was in the 3. Liga against Wehen Wiesbaden on 15 October, which finished as 2–2 draw. After the second match, Benno Möhlmann was announced as Münster's permanent manager.
