= Atmalıoğlu, Divriği =

Village in Sivas Province, Turkey

Atmalıoğlu
- Village
- Location in Turkey Atmalıoğlu (Turkey Central Anatolia)
- Coordinates: 39.227°N 38.293°E
- Country: Turkey
- Province: Sivas
- District: Divriği
- Population (2023): 25
- Time zone: UTC+3 (TRT)

Atmalıoğlu is a village in the Divriği District of Sivas Province in Turkey. It is populated by Kurds of the Canbeg tribe and had a population of 25 in 2023.
