= Bulgurluk, İmranlı =

Village in Sivas Province, Turkey

Bulgurluk
- Village
- Location in Turkey Bulgurluk (Turkey Central Anatolia)
- Coordinates: 39.841°N 38.134°E
- Country: Turkey
- Province: Sivas
- District: İmranlı
- Population (2023): 19
- Time zone: UTC+3 (TRT)

Bulgurluk is a village in the İmranlı District of Sivas Province in Turkey. It is populated by Kurds and had a population of 19 in 2023.

== History ==
The name of the village is recorded as Karlaş in the records from 1928.

== Geography ==
The village is 109 km away from the Sivas city center and 8 km away from the İmranlı district center.
