= Diktaş, Divriği =

Village in Sivas Province, Turkey

Diktaş
- Village
- Location in Turkey Diktaş (Turkey Central Anatolia)
- Coordinates: 39.498°N 37.888°E
- Country: Turkey
- Province: Sivas
- District: Divriği
- Population (2023): 34
- Time zone: UTC+3 (TRT)

Diktaş is a village in the Divriği District of Sivas Province in Turkey. It is populated by Turks and had a population of 34 in 2023.
