= Aşağışeyhli, İmranlı =

Village in Sivas Province, Turkey

Aşağışeyhli
- Village
- Location in Turkey Aşağışeyhli (Turkey Central Anatolia)
- Coordinates: 39.756°N 38.226°E
- Country: Turkey
- Province: Sivas
- District: İmranlı
- Population (2023): 68
- Time zone: UTC+3 (TRT)

Aşağışeyhli is a village in the İmranlı District of Sivas Province in Turkey. It is populated by Kurds and had a population of 68 in 2023.

== Geography ==
The village is located 131 km from the center of Sivas province and 24 km from the center of İmranlı district.
