= Beğendik, İmranlı =

Village in Sivas Province, Turkey

Beğendik
- Village
- Location in Turkey Beğendik (Turkey Central Anatolia)
- Coordinates: 39.883°N 38.033°E
- Country: Turkey
- Province: Sivas
- District: İmranlı
- Population (2023): 94
- Time zone: UTC+3 (TRT)

Beğendik is a village in the İmranlı District of Sivas Province in Turkey. It is populated by Kurds and had a population of 94 in 2023.

== History ==
The name of the village is recorded as Yazıhacey, which means "Hacı Hanım plain" in Kurdish, in the records of 1928.

== Geography ==
The village is located 95 km from the center of Sivas province and 7 km from the center of İmranlı district.
