= Dikmeçay, Divriği =

Village in Sivas Province, Turkey

Dikmeçay
- Village
- Location in Turkey Dikmeçay (Turkey Central Anatolia)
- Coordinates: 39.417°N 37.871°E
- Country: Turkey
- Province: Sivas
- District: Divriği
- Population (2023): 86
- Time zone: UTC+3 (TRT)

Dikmeçay is a village in the Divriği District of Sivas Province in Turkey. It is populated by Turks and had a population of 86 in 2023.
