= Gedikbaşı, Divriği =

Village in Sivas Province, Turkey

Gedikbaşı
- Village
- Location in Turkey Gedikbaşı (Turkey Central Anatolia)
- Coordinates: 39.489°N 38.247°E
- Country: Turkey
- Province: Sivas
- District: Divriği
- Population (2023): 66
- Time zone: UTC+3 (TRT)

Gedikbaşı is a village in the Divriği District of Sivas Province in Turkey. It is populated by Turks and had a population of 66 in 2023.
