= Dağyurdu, İmranlı =

Village in Sivas Province, Turkey

Dağyurdu
- Village
- Location in Turkey Dağyurdu (Turkey Central Anatolia)
- Coordinates: 39.918°N 38.269°E
- Country: Turkey
- Province: Sivas
- District: İmranlı
- Population (2023): 79
- Time zone: UTC+3 (TRT)

Dağyurdu is a village in the İmranlı District of Sivas Province in Turkey. It is populated by Kurds and had a population of 79 in 2023.
