= Taşlıca, İmranlı =

Village in Sivas Province, Turkey

Taşlıca
- Village
- Location in Turkey Taşlıca (Turkey Central Anatolia)
- Coordinates: 39.705°N 38.274°E
- Country: Turkey
- Province: Sivas
- District: İmranlı
- Population (2023): 37
- Time zone: UTC+3 (TRT)

Taşlıca is a village in the İmranlı District of Sivas Province in Turkey. It is populated by Kurds and had a population of 37 in 2023.

== Geography ==
The village is 138 km from the Sivas provincial center and 35 km from the İmranlı district center.
