= Akpınar, Gürün =

Village in Sivas Province, Turkey

Akpınar
- Village
- Location in Turkey Akpınar (Turkey Central Anatolia)
- Coordinates: 38.692°N 36.876°E
- Country: Turkey
- Province: Sivas
- District: Gürün
- Population (2023): 85
- Time zone: UTC+3 (TRT)

Akpınar is a village in the Gürün District of Sivas Province in Turkey. It is populated by Kurds of the Canbeg tribe and had a population of 85 in 2023.
