= Arık, İmranlı =

Village in Sivas Province, Turkey

Arık
- Village
- Location in Turkey Arık (Turkey Central Anatolia)
- Coordinates: 39.759°N 38.057°E
- Country: Turkey
- Province: Sivas
- District: İmranlı
- Population (2023): 104
- Time zone: UTC+3 (TRT)

Arık (Kurdish: Arix) is a village in the İmranlı District of Sivas Province in Turkey. It is populated by Kurds and had a population of 104 in 2023.

== Geography ==
The village is located 133 km from the Sivas city center and 33 km from the İmranlı district center.
