= Alacahacı, İmranlı =

Village in Sivas Province, Turkey

Alacahacı
- Village
- Location in Turkey Alacahacı (Turkey Central Anatolia)
- Coordinates: 39.730°N 38.162°E
- Country: Turkey
- Province: Sivas
- District: İmranlı
- Population (2023): 56
- Time zone: UTC+3 (TRT)

Alacahacı is a village in the İmranlı District of Sivas Province in Turkey. It is populated by Kurds and had a population of 56 in 2023.

== Geography ==
The village is 130 km away from the center of Sivas province and 24 km away from the center of İmranlı district.
