= Bayırüstü, Divriği =

Village in Sivas Province, Turkey

Bayırüstü
- Village
- Location in Turkey Bayırüstü (Turkey Central Anatolia)
- Coordinates: 39.255°N 38.153°E
- Country: Turkey
- Province: Sivas
- District: Divriği
- Population (2023): 72
- Time zone: UTC+3 (TRT)

Bayırüstü is a village in the Divriği District of Sivas Province in Turkey. It is populated by Turks and had a population of 72 in 2023.
