= Taşdelen, İmranlı =

Village in Sivas Province, Turkey

Taşdelen
- Village
- Location in Turkey Taşdelen (Turkey Central Anatolia)
- Coordinates: 39.713°N 38.290°E
- Country: Turkey
- Province: Sivas
- District: İmranlı
- Population (2023): 21
- Time zone: UTC+3 (TRT)

Taşdelen (Kurdish: Kusura) is a village in the İmranlı District of Sivas Province in Turkey. It is populated by Kurds and had a population of 21 in 2023.

== Geography ==
The village is 140 km from the Sivas provincial center and 37 km from the İmranlı district center.
