= Akdere, Gürün =

Village in Sivas Province, Turkey

Akdere
- Village
- Location in Turkey Akdere (Turkey Central Anatolia)
- Coordinates: 38.603°N 36.904°E
- Country: Turkey
- Province: Sivas
- District: Gürün
- Population (2023): 101
- Time zone: UTC+3 (TRT)

Akdere is a village in the Gürün District of Sivas Province in Turkey. It is populated by Kurds of the Atma tribe and had a population of 101 in 2023.
