= Güllüce, Divriği =

Village in Sivas Province, Turkey

Güllüce
- Village
- Location in Turkey Güllüce (Turkey Central Anatolia)
- Coordinates: 39.445°N 37.677°E
- Country: Turkey
- Province: Sivas
- District: Divriği
- Population (2023): 49
- Time zone: UTC+3 (TRT)

Güllüce is a village in the Divriği District of Sivas Province in Turkey. It is populated by Kurds of the Canbeg tribe and had a population of 49 in 2023.
