= Ağaçlıgöl, Divriği =

Village in Sivas Province, Turkey

Ağaçlıgöl
- Village
- Location in Turkey Ağaçlıgöl (Turkey Central Anatolia)
- Coordinates: 39.167°N 38.233°E
- Country: Turkey
- Province: Sivas
- District: Divriği
- Population (2023): 36
- Time zone: UTC+3 (TRT)

Ağaçlıgöl, also known as Göndürüm, a village in the Divriği District of Sivas Province in Turkey. It is populated by Kurds of the Canbeg tribe and had a population of 36 in 2023.
