= Beldibi, Divriği =

Village in Sivas Province, Turkey

Beldibi
- Village
- Location in Turkey Beldibi (Turkey Central Anatolia)
- Coordinates: 39.174°N 38.270°E
- Country: Turkey
- Province: Sivas
- District: Divriği
- Population (2023): 86
- Time zone: UTC+3 (TRT)

Beldibi (Kurdish: Livan) is a village in the Divriği District of Sivas Province in Turkey. It is populated by Kurds of the Canbeg tribe and had a population of 86 in 2023.
