= Demirtaş, İmranlı =

Village in Sivas Province, Turkey

Demirtaş
- Village
- Location in Turkey Demirtaş (Turkey Central Anatolia)
- Coordinates: 39.804°N 38.220°E
- Country: Turkey
- Province: Sivas
- District: İmranlı
- Population (2023): 85
- Time zone: UTC+3 (TRT)

Demirtaş (Kurdish: Has) is a village in the İmranlı District of Sivas Province in Turkey. It is populated by Kurds and had a population of 85 in 2023.
