= Bağyazı, İmranlı =

Village in Sivas Province, Turkey

Bağyazı
- Village
- Location in Turkey Bağyazı (Turkey Central Anatolia)
- Coordinates: 39.694°N 38.311°E
- Country: Turkey
- Province: Sivas
- District: İmranlı
- Population (2023): 23
- Time zone: UTC+3 (TRT)

Bağyazı is a village in the İmranlı District of Sivas Province in Turkey. It is populated by Kurds and had a population of 23 in 2023.

== Geography ==
The village is 140 km away from Sivas city center and 38 km away from İmranlı district center.
