= Camiliyurt, Gürün =

Village in Sivas Province, Turkey

Camiliyurt
- Village
- Location in Turkey Camiliyurt (Turkey Central Anatolia)
- Coordinates: 38.650°N 36.834°E
- Country: Turkey
- Province: Sivas
- District: Gürün
- Population (2023): 49
- Time zone: UTC+3 (TRT)

Camiliyurt is a village in the Gürün District of Sivas Province in Turkey. It is populated by Kurds of the Sinemili tribe and had a population of 49 in 2023.
