= Güldede, Gürün =

Village in Sivas Province, Turkey

Güldede
- Village
- Location in Turkey Güldede (Turkey Central Anatolia)
- Coordinates: 38.648°N 36.985°E
- Country: Turkey
- Province: Sivas
- District: Gürün
- Population (2023): 54
- Time zone: UTC+3 (TRT)

Güldede is a village in the Gürün District of Sivas Province in Turkey. It is populated by Kurds of the Atma tribe and Turks and had a population of 54 in 2023.
