= Göndüren, Divriği =

Village in Sivas Province, Turkey

Göndüren
- Village
- Location in Turkey Göndüren (Turkey Central Anatolia)
- Coordinates: 39.212°N 38.031°E
- Country: Turkey
- Province: Sivas
- District: Divriği
- Population (2023): 67
- Time zone: UTC+3 (TRT)

Göndüren is a village in the Divriği District of Sivas Province in Turkey. It is populated by Kurds of the Sinemilli tribe and had a population of 67 in 2023.
