= Aşağıboğaz, İmranlı =

Village in Sivas Province, Turkey

Aşağıboğaz
- Village
- Location in Turkey Aşağıboğaz (Turkey Central Anatolia)
- Coordinates: 39.889°N 38.220°E
- Country: Turkey
- Province: Sivas
- District: İmranlı
- Population (2023): 35
- Time zone: UTC+3 (TRT)

Aşağıboğaz is a village in the İmranlı District of Sivas Province in Turkey. It is populated by Kurds and had a population of 35 in 2023.

== Geography ==
The village is located 121 km from the Sivas city center and 25 km from the İmranlı district center.
