= Gölören, Divriği =

Village in Sivas Province, Turkey

Gölören
- Village
- Location in Turkey Gölören (Turkey Central Anatolia)
- Coordinates: 39.442°N 37.767°E
- Country: Turkey
- Province: Sivas
- District: Divriği
- Population (2023): 84
- Time zone: UTC+3 (TRT)

Gölören is a village in the Divriği District of Sivas Province in Turkey. It is populated by Turks and had a population of 84 in 2023.
