= Gökçebel, Divriği =

Village in Sivas Province, Turkey

Gökçebel
- Village
- Location in Turkey Gökçebel (Turkey Central Anatolia)
- Coordinates: 39.210°N 37.957°E
- Country: Turkey
- Province: Sivas
- District: Divriği
- Population (2023): 33
- Time zone: UTC+3 (TRT)

Gökçebel is a village in the Divriği District of Sivas Province in Turkey. It is populated by Kurds of the Sinemilli tribe and had a population of 33 in 2023.
