= Gelenli, İmranlı =

Village in Sivas Province, Turkey

Gelenli
- Village
- Location in Turkey Gelenli (Turkey Central Anatolia)
- Coordinates: 39.778°N 38.148°E
- Country: Turkey
- Province: Sivas
- District: İmranlı
- Population (2023): 53
- Time zone: UTC+3 (TRT)

Gelenli is a village in the İmranlı District of Sivas Province in Turkey. It is populated by Kurds and had a population of 53 in 2023.
