= Aydoğan, İmranlı =

Village in Sivas Province, Turkey

Aydoğan
- Village
- Location in Turkey Aydoğan (Turkey Central Anatolia)
- Coordinates: 39.601°N 38.305°E
- Country: Turkey
- Province: Sivas
- District: İmranlı
- Population (2023): 85
- Time zone: UTC+3 (TRT)

Aydoğan is a village in the İmranlı District of Sivas Province in Turkey. It is populated by Turks and had a population of 85 in 2023.

== Geography ==
The village is located 155 km from the Sivas city center and 50 km from the İmranlı district center.
