= Bahtiyar, İmranlı =

Village in Sivas Province, Turkey

Bahtiyar
- Village
- Location in Turkey Bahtiyar (Turkey Central Anatolia)
- Coordinates: 39.737°N 38.245°E
- Country: Turkey
- Province: Sivas
- District: İmranlı
- Population (2023): 96
- Time zone: UTC+3 (TRT)

Bahtiyar is a village in the İmranlı District of Sivas Province in Turkey. It is populated by Turks and had a population of 96 in 2023.

== History ==
The village's name was recorded as Bahtiyar in the records of 1522 and 1928, and as Utile in the records of 1968. Some written information about the village is found in the Avârız registers of 1642. At that time, the settlement, referred to as "Necteyar (Bahtiyar)," was part of the central sub-district of Kuruçay in the Erzurum Province, and it had 16 Muslim households subject to avârız tax.

== Geography ==
The village is located 139 km from the Sivas city center and 27 km from the İmranlı district center.
