= Akkaya, İmranlı =

Village in Sivas Province, Turkey

Akkaya
- Village
- Location in Turkey Akkaya (Turkey Central Anatolia)
- Coordinates: 39.729°N 38.359°E
- Country: Turkey
- Province: Sivas
- District: İmranlı
- Population (2023): 77
- Time zone: UTC+3 (TRT)

Akkaya is a village in the İmranlı District of Sivas Province in Turkey. It is populated by Kurds and had a population of 77 in 2023.

== Geography ==
The village is 153 km away from the center of Sivas province and 35 km away from the center of İmranlı district.
