= Akıncılar District =

District of Sivas Province, Turkey

- District
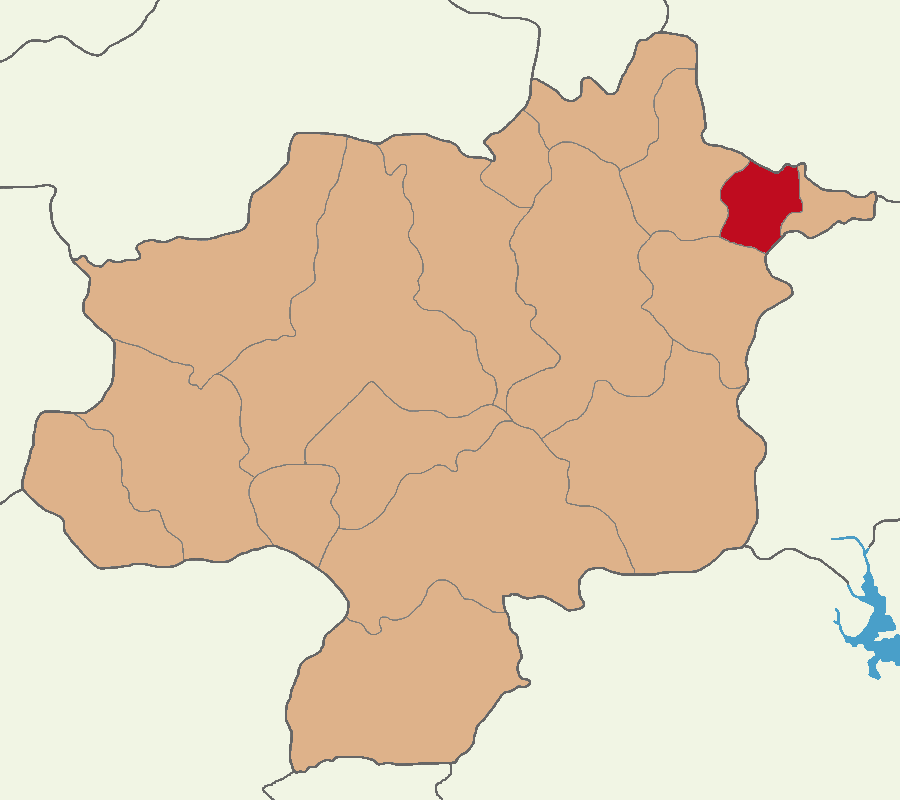
- Map showing Akıncılar District in Sivas Province

- Location within Turkey Location within Turkey Central Anatolia
- Coordinates: 40°05′N 38°21′E
- Country: Turkey
- Province: Sivas
- Seat: Akıncılar

Government
  - Kaymakam: Tarık Safa Kahveci
- Area: 432 km^{2} (167 sq mi)
- Population (2022): 4,808
  - Density: 11.1/km^{2} (28.8/sq mi)
- Time zone: UTC+3 (TRT)
- Website: www.akincilar.gov.tr

Akıncılar District is a district of the Sivas Province of Turkey. Its seat is the town of Akıncılar. Its area is 432 km^{2}, and its population is 4,808 (2022).

== Composition ==
There is one municipality in Akıncılar District:

- Akıncılar

There are 29 villages in Akıncılar District:

- Abdurrahman
- Aşağıyeniköy
- Avşar
- Balçık
- Ballıdere
- Çiçekli
- Derecik
- Doğantepe
- Dündar
- Ekenek
- Elibüyük
- Eskibağ
- Geyikpınar
- Göllüce
- Kavakköy
- Kayı
- Kılıç
- Onarı
- Ortaköy
- Sapanlı
- Şenbağlar
- Sevindik
- Sıyrındı
- Uğrunca
- Üzengi
- Yağlıçayır
- Yukarısarıca
- Yünlüce
- Yusufşeyh
