= Ekincik, İmranlı =

Village in Sivas Province, Turkey

Ekincik
- Village
- Location in Turkey Ekincik (Turkey Central Anatolia)
- Coordinates: 39.794°N 38.407°E
- Country: Turkey
- Province: Sivas
- District: İmranlı
- Population (2023): 25
- Time zone: UTC+3 (TRT)

Ekincik (Kurdish: Kaxnut) is a village in the İmranlı District of Sivas Province in Turkey. It is populated by Kurds and had a population of 25 in 2023.
