= İmranlı =

- Municipality
- Location in Turkey İmranlı (Turkey Central Anatolia)
- Coordinates: 39°52′48″N 38°7′58″E
- Country: Turkey
- Province: Sivas
- District: İmranlı

Government
  - Mayor: Özkan Demir (AKP)
- Elevation: 1,650 m (5,410 ft)
- Population (2023): 3,084
- Time zone: UTC+3 (TRT)
- Postal code: 58980
- Area code: 0346
- Website: www.imranli.bel.tr

İmranlı (Kurdish: Macîran) is a town in Sivas Province of Turkey. It is the seat of İmranlı District. Its population is 3,084 (2022). The mayor is Özkan Demir (AKP). The town is located at 108 km to Sivas.

The town is populated by Sunni Turks and Alevi Kurds.

== Neighborhoods ==
The town is divided into the neighborhoods of Çarşıbaşı, Durcan, Karatekin, Karşıyaka, Kızılırmak, Vali Tuncel, Yaylacık, Yenidoğan and Yenimahalle.

== Population ==
Historical population

| Year | Pop. | ±% p.a. |
|---|---|---|
| 1955 | 1,158 | — |
| 1960 | 2,769 | +19.05% |
| 1965 | 3,176 | +2.78% |
| 1970 | 4,274 | +6.12% |
| 1975 | 5,667 | +5.80% |
| 1980 | 6,421 | +2.53% |
| 1985 | 6,806 | +1.17% |

| Year | Pop. | ±% p.a. |
|---|---|---|
| 1990 | 7,414 | +1.73% |
| 1997 | 6,926 | −0.97% |
| 2007 | 4,015 | −5.31% |
| 2015 | 3,084 | −3.24% |
| 2020 | 2,896 | −1.25% |
| 2023 | 3,084 | +2.12% |

Source: Population censuses (1955-1997) and TÜIK (2007-2022)
