= Divriği District =

District of Sivas Province, Turkey

- District
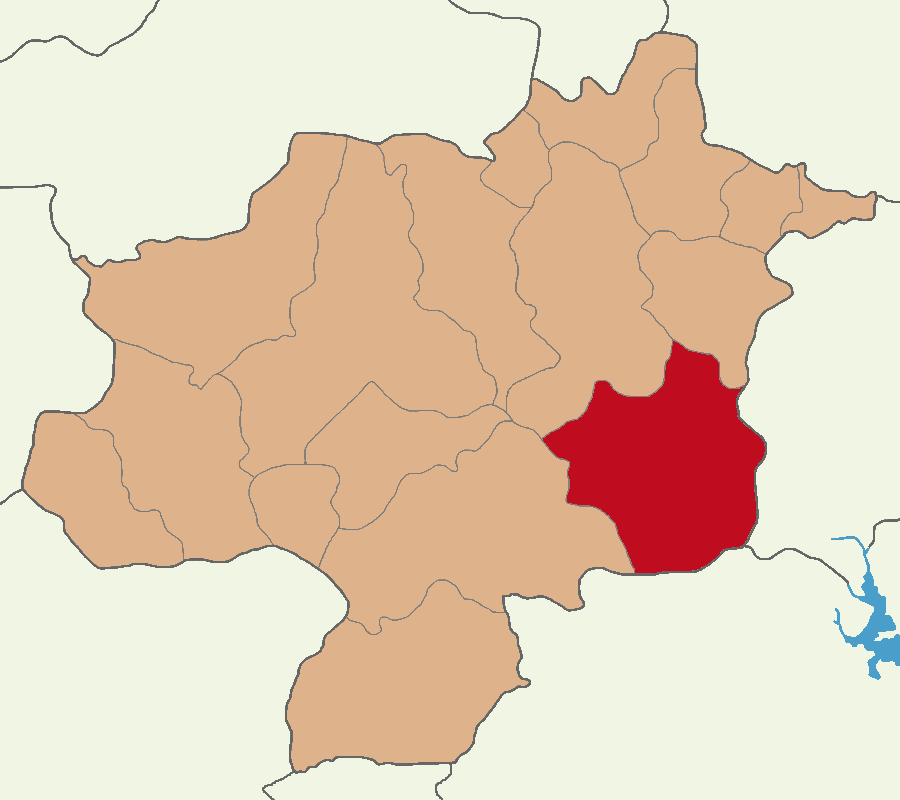
- Map showing Divriği District in Sivas Province

- Location in Turkey Divriği District (Turkey Central Anatolia)
- Coordinates: 39°22′N 38°07′E
- Country: Turkey
- Province: Sivas
- Seat: Divriği

Government
  - Kaymakam: Yakup Papaker
- Area: 2,632 km^{2} (1,016 sq mi)
- Population (2023): 16,893
  - Density: 6.4/km^{2} (17/sq mi)
- Time zone: UTC+3 (TRT)
- Website: www.divrigi.gov.tr

Divriği District is a district of the Sivas Province of Turkey. Its seat is the town of Divriği. Its area is 2,632 km^{2}, and its population is 16,893 (2023).

== Demographics ==
Divriği District has an Alevi majority and most villages are inhabited by Alevis. The main town of Divriği is evenly divided between Alevis and Sunnis.

== Composition ==
There is one municipality in Divriği District:

- Divriği

There are 105 villages in Divriği District:

- Adatepe
- Ağaçlıgöl
- Akbaba
- Akmeşe
- Akpelit
- Arıkbaşı
- Atmalıoğlu
- Avşarcık
- Bahçeli
- Bahtiyar
- Balova
- Başören
- Bayırlı
- Bayırüstü
- Beldibi
- Beyköy
- Çakırağa
- Çakırtarla
- Çakmakdüzü
- Çamlık
- Çamurlu
- Çayören
- Çayözü
- Çiğdemli
- Çitme
- Çobandurağı
- Çukuröz
- Derimli
- Dikmeçay
- Diktaş
- Dişbudak
- Dumluca
- Duruköy
- Eğrisu
- Ekinbaşı
- Erikli
- Eskibeyli
- Gedikbaşı
- Gezey
- Gökçebel
- Gökçeharman
- Gölören
- Göndüren
- Gözecik
- Gözecik
- Güllüce
- Günbahçe
- Güneş
- Güneyevler
- Güresin
- Gürpınar
- Güvenkaya
- Handere
- Höbek
- İkizbaşak
- İmirhan
- İnanlı
- İncirlipınar
- Kaledibi
- Karaağaçlı
- Karakale
- Karakuzulu
- Karaman
- Karasar
- Karşıkonak
- Kavaklısu
- Kayaburun
- Keçikaya
- Kekliktepe
- Kesme
- Kırkgöz
- Kızılcaören
- Kuluncak
- Madenli
- Maltepe
- Mursal
- Ödek
- Oğulbey
- Ölçekli
- Olukman
- Ortaköy
- Ovacık
- Oyuktepe
- Özbağı
- Şahinköy
- Selimoğlu
- Sırçalı
- Sincan
- Soğucak
- Susuzlar
- Susuzören
- Tepehan
- Üçpınar
- Uluçayır
- Ürük
- Uzunbağ
- Uzunkaya
- Yağbasan
- Yalnızsöğüt
- Yazı
- Yerliçay
- Yeşilyayla
- Yeşilyol
- Yusufşeyh
- Yuva
