= Atlıca, İmranlı =

Village in Sivas Province, Turkey

Atlıca
- Village
- Location in Turkey Atlıca (Turkey Central Anatolia)
- Coordinates: 39.818°N 38.318°E
- Country: Turkey
- Province: Sivas
- District: İmranlı
- Population (2023): 56
- Time zone: UTC+3 (TRT)

Atlıca (Kurdish: Azgêr) is a village in the İmranlı District of Sivas Province in Turkey. It is populated by Kurds and had a population of 56 in 2023.

== Geography ==
The village is located 112 km from the Sivas city center.
