= TCDD HT65000 =

High-speed train type

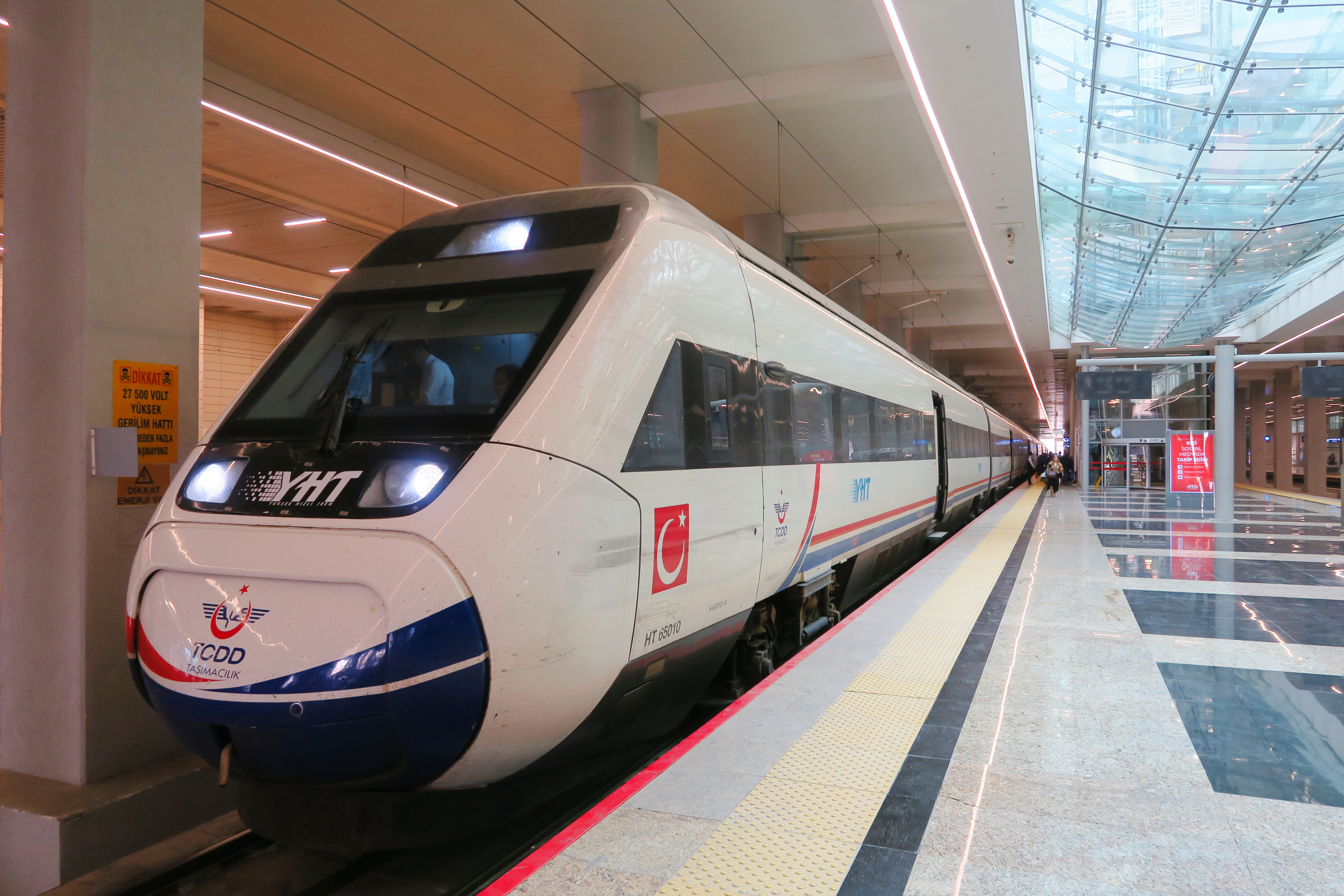
- A TCDD HT65000 at the ATG terminal in Ankara
- Manufacturer: CAF
- Built at: Beasain, Basque Region, Spain
- Entered service: 2009
- Number built: 12
- Formation: 6 cars; modular design allows the train to be reconstructed with two additional cars
- Fleet numbers: HT65001-HT65012
- Capacity: 419
- Operator: TCDD Taşımacılık
- Line served: Ankara-İstanbul İstanbul-Konya

Specifications
- Train length: 158.5 m (520 ft 3/16 in)
- Car length: 27.350 m (89 ft 8 3/4 in)
- Width: 2.825 m (9 ft 3 1/4 in)
- Height: 4.1 m (13 ft 5 7/16 in)
- Floor height: 130 cm (51 3/16 in)
- Doors: 2 per car
- Maximum speed: 250 km/h (155 mph)
- Power output: 4,800 kW
- Tractive effort: 200 kN
- Acceleration: 0.48 m/s²
- Power supply: Pantograph
- Electric system: 25 kV, 50 Hz AC Overhead line
- Coupling system: Scharfenberg
- Track gauge: 1,435 mm (4 ft 8 1/2 in) standard gauge

TCDD HT65000 is a series of twelve high-speed electric multiple units built by the Construcciones y Auxiliar de Ferrocarriles (CAF) of Spain for the Turkish State Railways (TCDD), The EMUs are used on the Turkish high-speed railway network and can reach a maximum commercial speed of 250 km/h.

== History ==
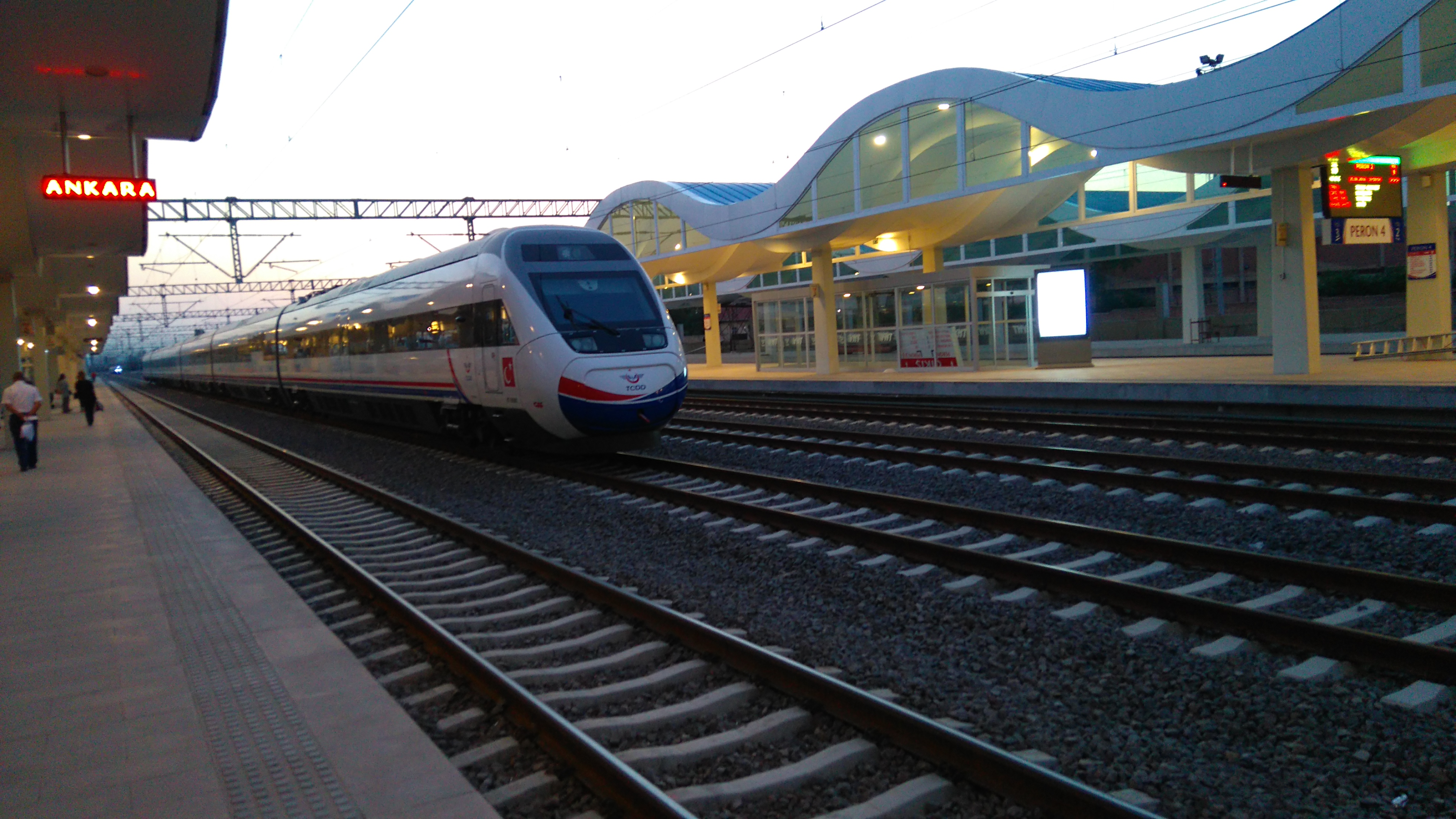
A TCDD HT65000 in Eskişehir

This series was ordered in two batches of ten and two trains. They are being financed via a foreign loan over 22 years, with a seven-year grace period. The first set left Spain on 10 November 2007 and arrived in Turkey at Kapıkule on 20 November 2007. Later, 4 more sets came to Turkey in 2008, 3 more in 2009 and 2 more in 2010. On 13 March 2009, the inaugural ceremony took place in Ankara; attended by President Abdullah Gül, Prime Minister Tayyip Erdoğan, and Minister of Transport Binali Yıldırım, who started the YHT service with one of these sets. Subsequently, 2 additional sets were ordered with the same characteristics, reaching a total of twelve HT65000 trains.

On 13 November 2009, the HT65006 derailed and became temporarily unusable after an accident (without injuries or fatalities) at Hasanbey near Eskişehir while it was passing from the high-speed line to the classical line.

== Design ==
=== Visual ===
The design of TCDD HT65000 is based on the RENFE Class 120 / 121 trains.

=== Technical ===
The trains have 6 cars, but are modular in design and can be reconstructed as 8-car units with two additional cars. It is also possible to connect two units together to create a 12-car unit. All trains are fitted with ETCS.

=== Interior ===
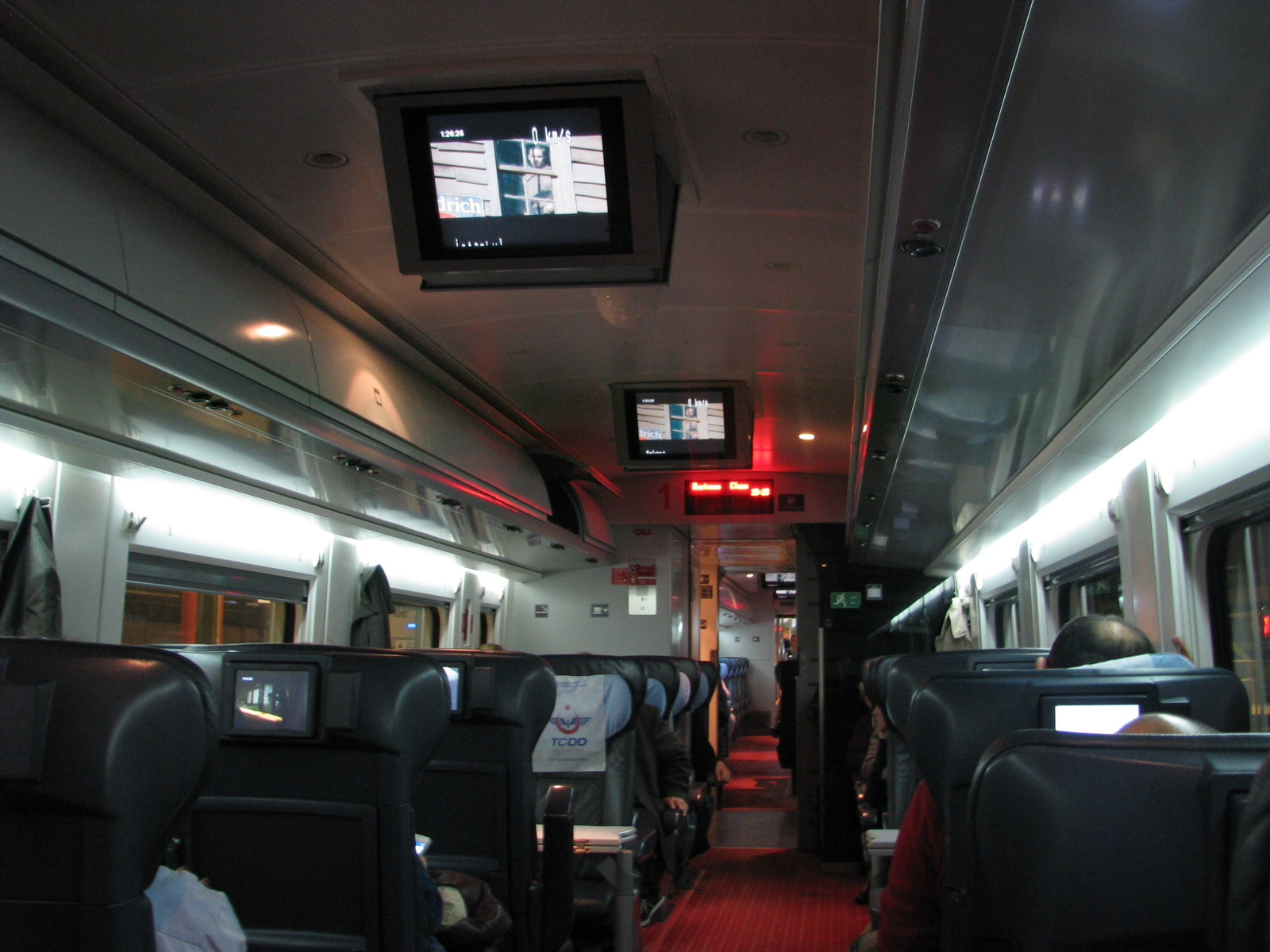
Business class

The cars of the sets are organized as follows: 1 first class car, 1 café car and 4 economy class cars. Automatic sliding doors provide passage between cars. Baggage may be stowed in the overhead compartments above the seats, or underneath the seats. The cars are wheelchair-accessible.

In economy class, fabric-coated seats are arranged in 2+2 with audio system. With acoustic and thermal comfort (the noise level will be less than 65 dB in passenger sections), apart from the tables mounted at the back of the seats, there are two foldable tables in every passenger section.

In first class, there are leather-coated seats in 2+1 arrangement, a visual and audio broadcasting system that can broadcast at least 4 hours on 4 different channels. Wi-Fi service is available with power inputs for laptops in business class.

== See also ==
- TCDD HT80000
- Yüksek Hızlı Tren
- High-speed rail in Turkey
- Turkish State Railways
- List of high speed trains
