= Ankara Tren Garı =

Mixed-use commercial building in Ankara, Turkey

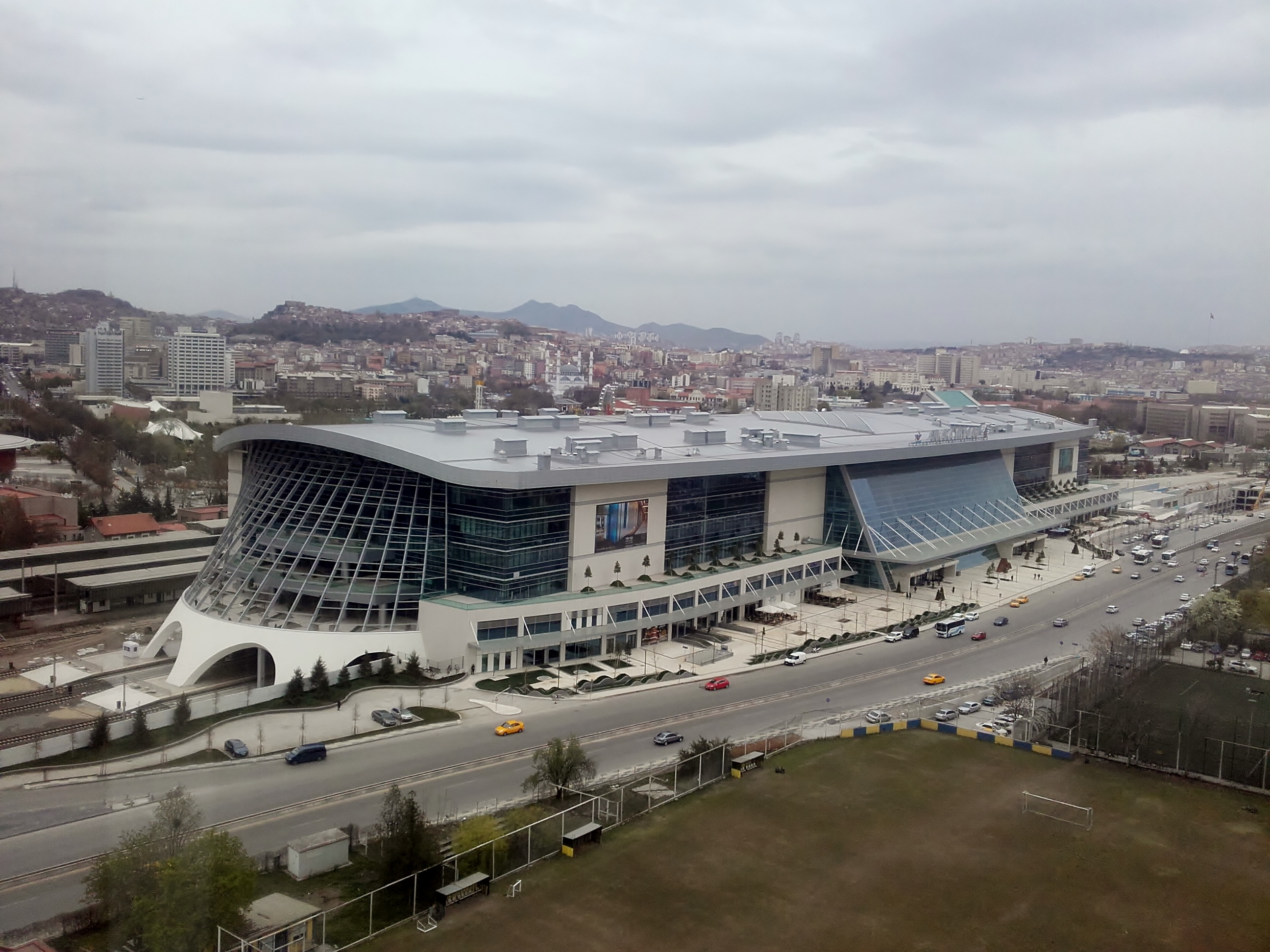
- Interactive map of the Ankara Tren Garı area
- Alternative names: Ankara Yüksek Hızlı Tren Garı

General information
- Status: Opened
- Architectural style: Modernism
- Location: Celal Bayar Blv. 73-78, Anafartalar Mah. 06050, Altındağ, Ankara, Turkey
- Coordinates: 39.9359455°N 32.8417373°E
- Elevation: 857 m (2,812 ft)
- Named for: Ankara railway station
- Construction started: 9 December 2013
- Completed: May 2016
- Opened: 29 October 2016
- Cost: $235 million
- Client: TCDD Taşımacılık
- Owner: Turkish State Railways
- Landlord: Ankara Tren Garı İşletilmesi

Height
- Height: 30 m (98 ft)

Technical details
- Floor count: 8
- Floor area: 178,000 m^{2} (1,920,000 sq ft)

Design and construction
- Architecture firm: TÜMAŞ

Other information
- Parking: 2,275 spaces
- Public transit access: YHT

Website
- Ankara Tren Garı

Ankara Tren Garı ("Ankara Train Station"), alternatively known as Ankara YHT railway station (Turkish: Ankara Yüksek Hızlı Tren Garı) and abbreviated as ATG, is a mixed-use commercial building in Ankara, Turkey. The building houses a shopping mall, a five-star hotel and commercial offices, as well as a concourse for YHT high-speed trains.

Situated next to the Ankara railway station, the ATG terminal was built on the southern half of land used by the Ankara station, on the former site of two platforms serving commuter trains along with storage tracks. The building officially opened on 29 October 2016, on the 93rd anniversary of the proclamation of the Republic of Turkey, along with Ankara station's high-speed platforms located underneath the structure.

The building is owned by the Turkish State Railways (TCDD) and operated by a private company known as Ankara Tren Gar İşletmesi A.Ş. TCDD Taşımacılık uses the building for its ticket and information booths, waiting area and its VIP/CIP lounge. The building itself is 30 m (98 ft) tall with eight floors.

== History ==
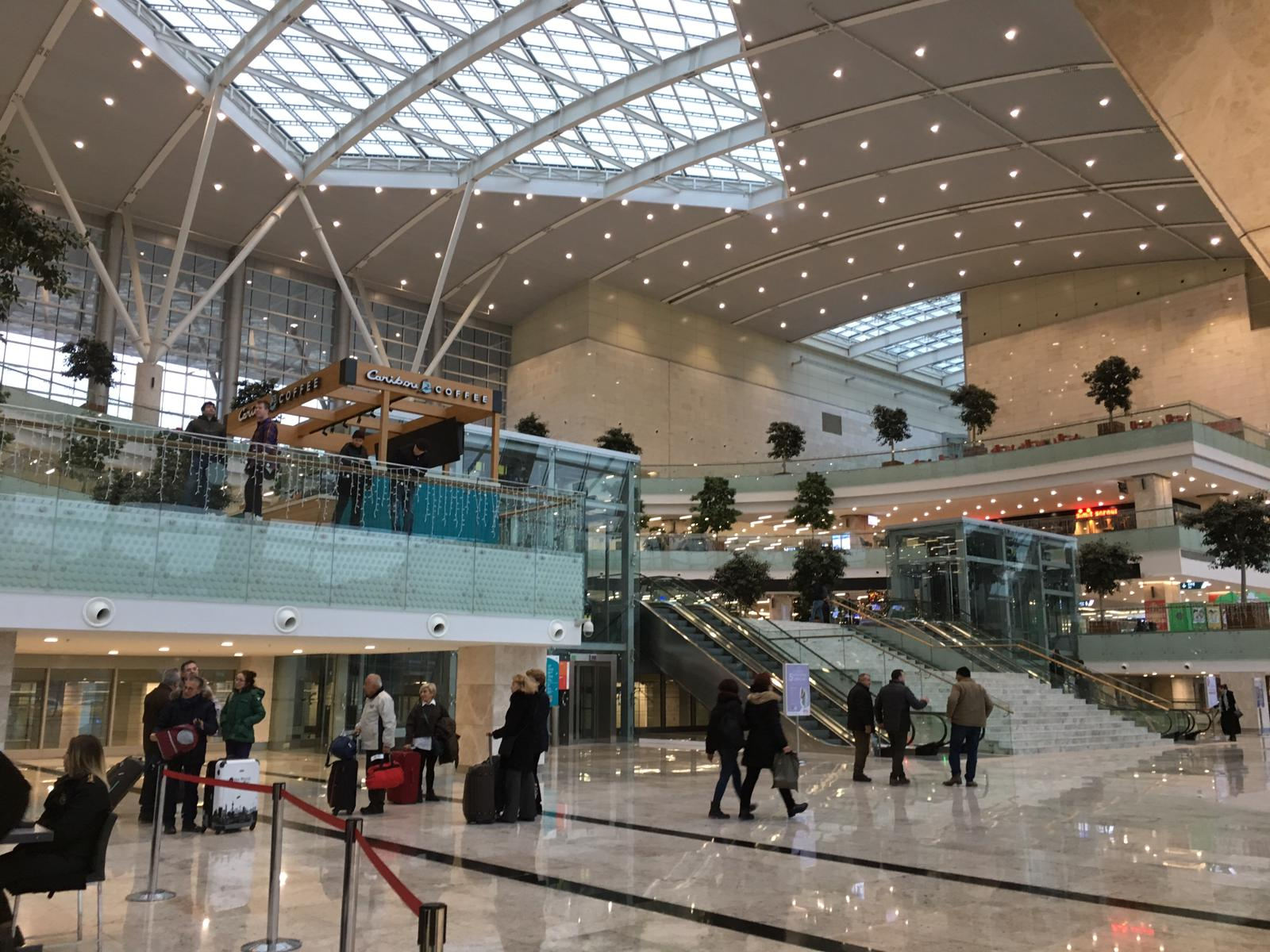
Main hall of the ATG terminal for YHT passenger services

When construction works of the Ankara-Istanbul high-speed railway line commenced in 2004, plans for a new railway station in Ankara were put forth as part of a large-scale modernization of the railways in Turkey. In August 2005, Turkish State Railways (TCDD) awarded a joint bid of 946,155 YTL from the Sudop Praha AS – SDPAK consortium to construct the ATG terminal. According to the original plan, the new station was going to encompass the entire existing station area like the new Eskişehir station. Construction of the new station was approved on 11 July 2007 by the Ankara city council. Plans for the new station were met with criticism from many architects, due to the fact that it would be demolishing several historic buildings within the grounds of the Ankara station. However, in 2008, plans for the station were halted when the Ankara 16th District Court overruled the city council's decision, citing that the project would endanger the historic structures at the Ankara station.

The State Railways revised their plans for the station, and the new terminal was designed to encompass only the two southernmost platforms and adjacent yard tracks. These platforms were used by commuter trains to Sincan and Kayaş and would have been replaced anyway, by the Başkentray project. On 28 August 2012, the bid for the revised station was awarded to a consortium consisting of Limak Holding, Kolin and Cengiz İnşaat within a time-frame of 24 months. Using the build-operate-transfer model, the consortium will own and operate the station for 19 years and 7 months, until 2036.

Construction started on 9 December 2013 with the demolition of the Ankara suburban platforms. The station structure was completed by May 2016 and was officially opened to passenger traffic on 29 October 2016, with a large ceremony that President Recep Tayyip Erdoğan, Prime Minister Binali Yıldırım and Minister of Transport Ahmet Arslan attended.

== Overview ==
The construction of the YHT station was completed in two years. It was opened to service on 29 October 2016, on the 93rd anniversary of the proclamation of the Turkish Republic. It was constructed by the company "Ankara Tren Garı İşletmesi" (ATG) (literally Ankara Train Station Company) in the build–operate–transfer financial model. The YHT station will serve 50,000 passengers a day, 15 million annually. In addition to the train station, there are a hotel with 134 rooms, a mall with 217 shops and a conference hall in the 8-story building. Currently, except for the train services, the station is operated by the AGT company. In 2036, after 19 years and 7 months, the whole infrastructure will be handed over to the Turkish State Railways (TCDD).

The total area of the ATG terminal, including the mall and the hotel, is 194,460 m^{2} (2,093,200 sq ft). There are three railway platforms and six tracks.

== Image gallery ==
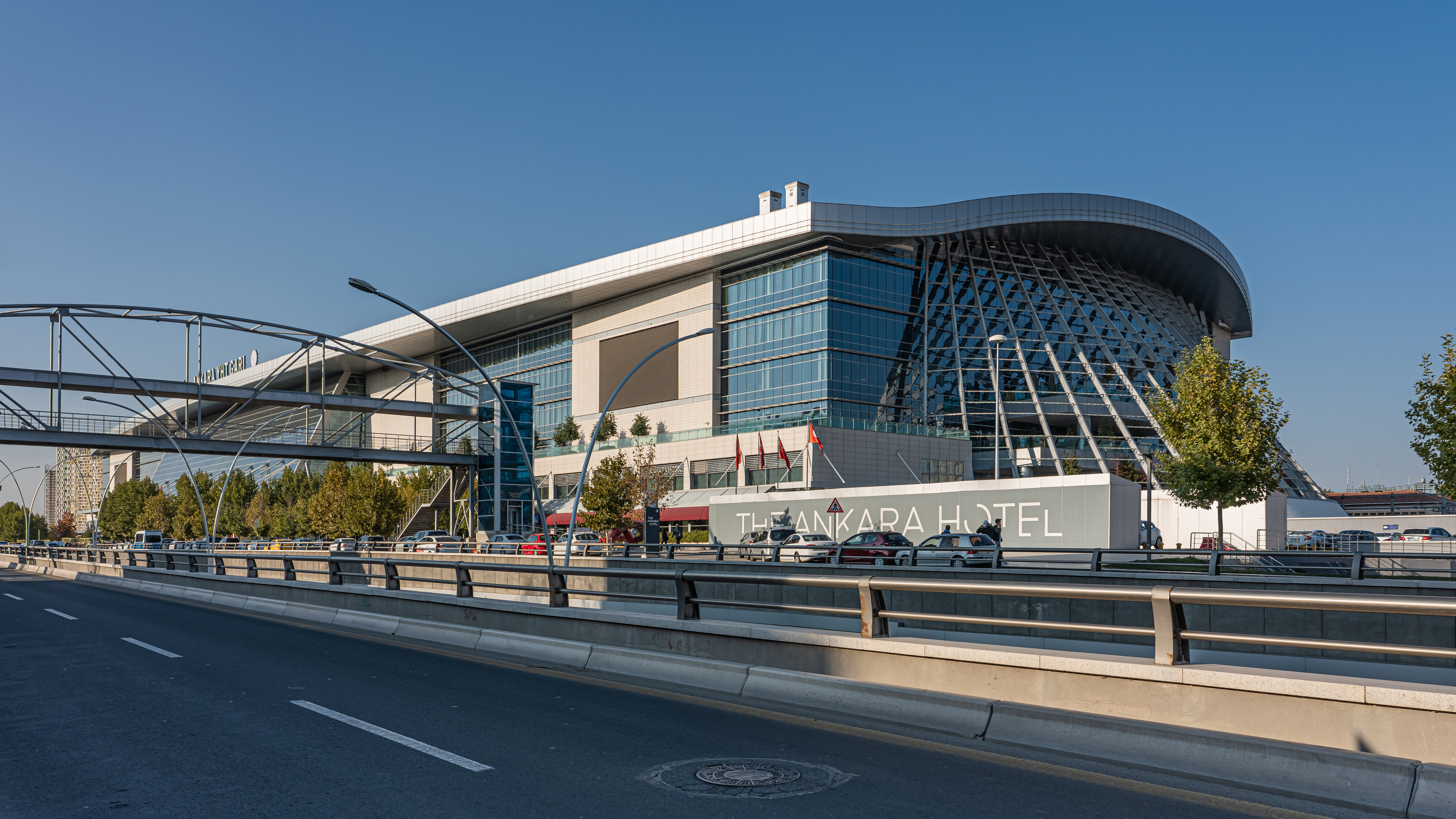
Street view of the ATG terminal

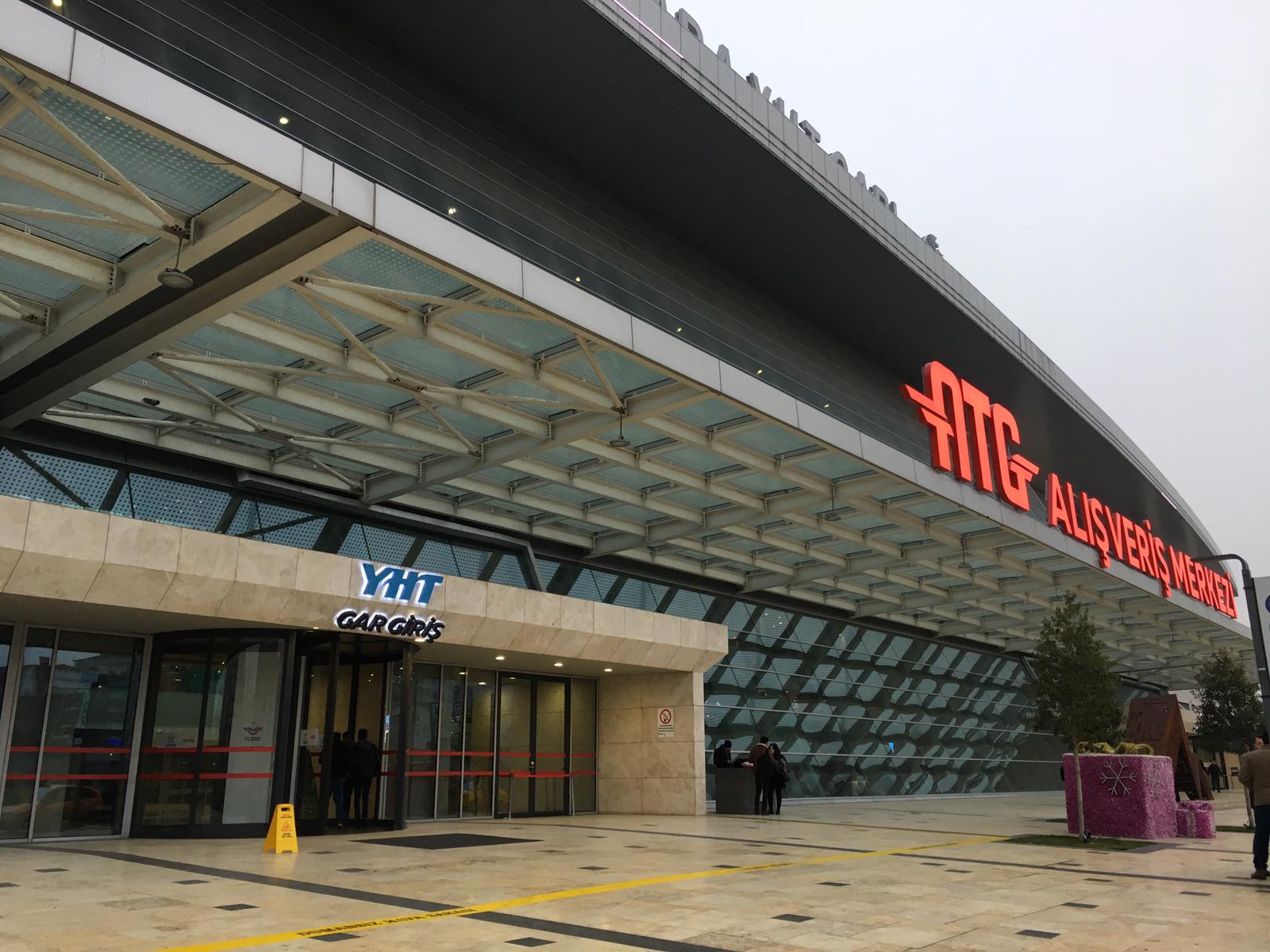
Main entrance of the ATG terminal

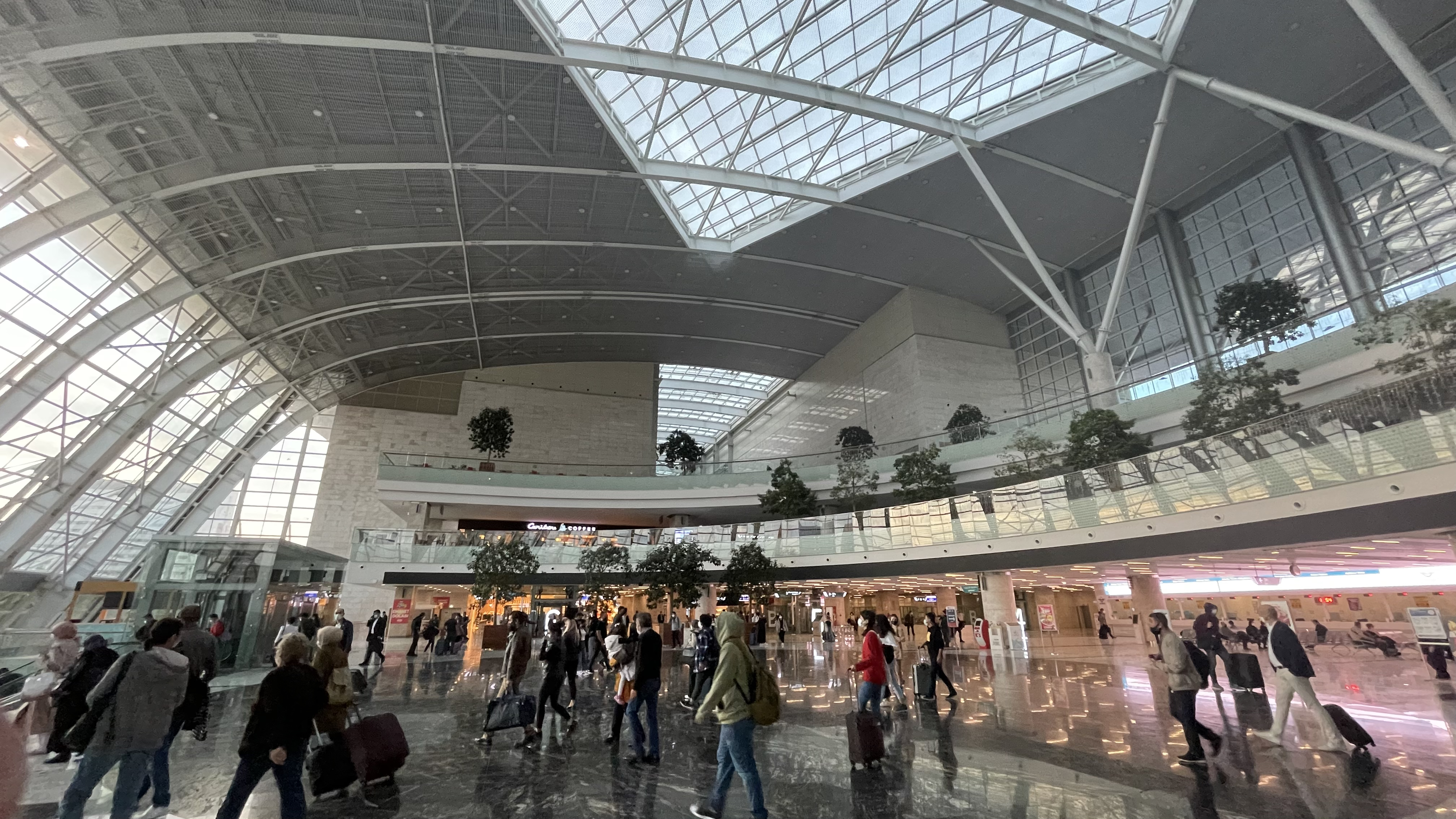
Main hall of the ATG terminal for YHT passenger services

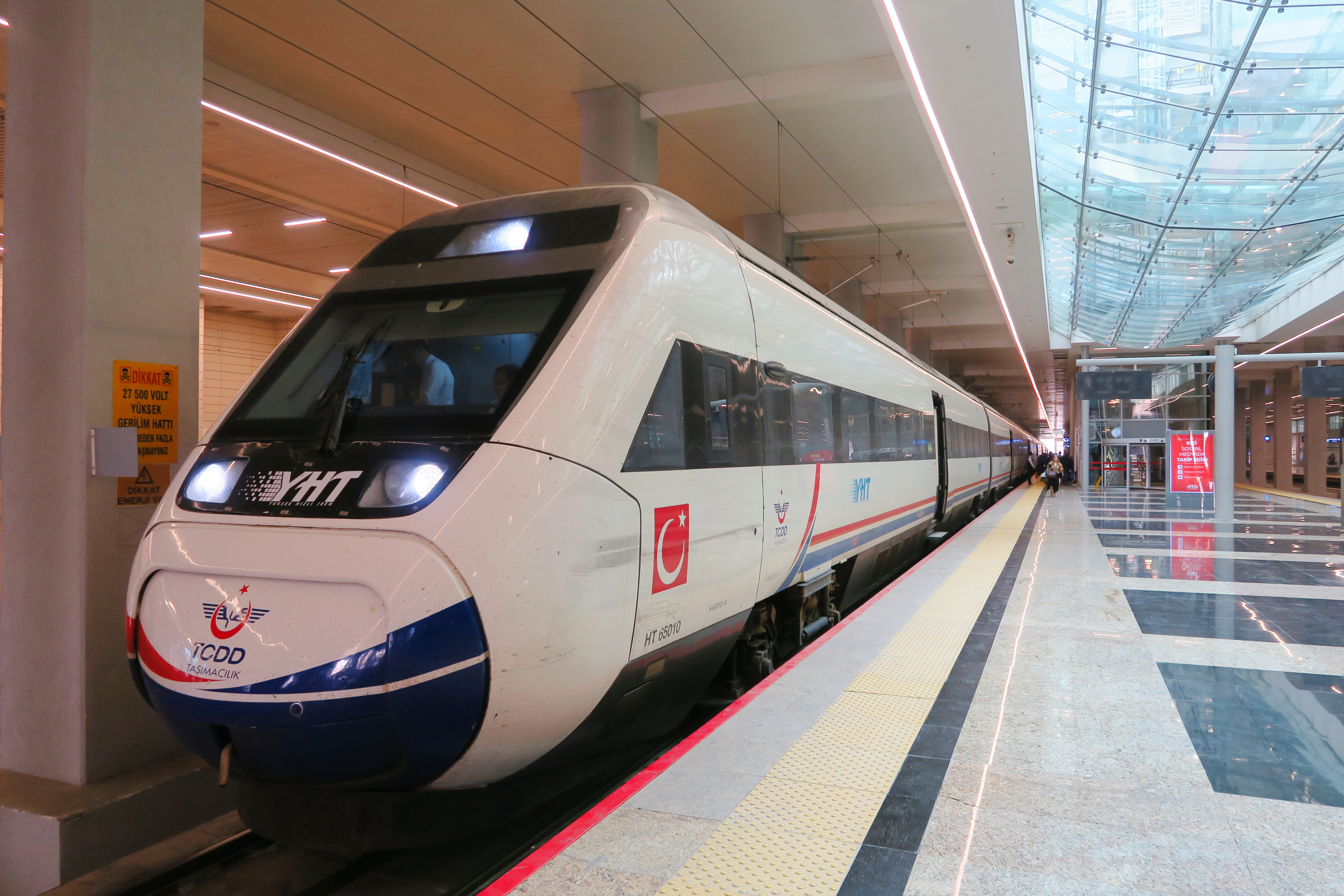
A TCDD HT65000 EMU awaiting departure from the tracks underneath the ATG terminal

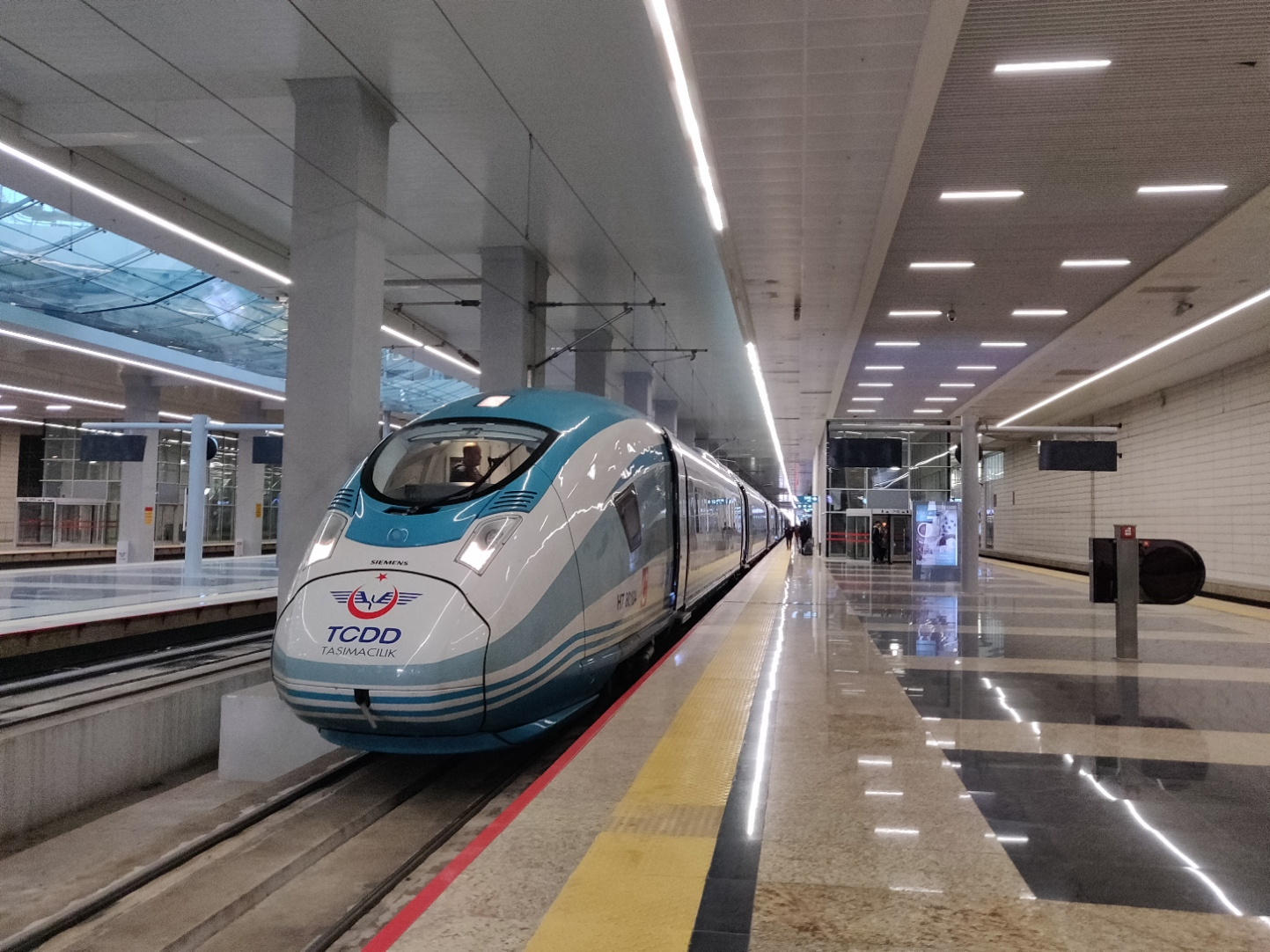
A TCDD HT80000 EMU awaiting departure from the tracks underneath the ATG terminal

== Services ==
Currently there are only three YHT trains serving the ATG terminal in Ankara:

- Ankara–Eskişehir
- Ankara–Istanbul
- Ankara–Konya
- Ankara–Sivas
