= TCDD HT80000 =

High-speed train type

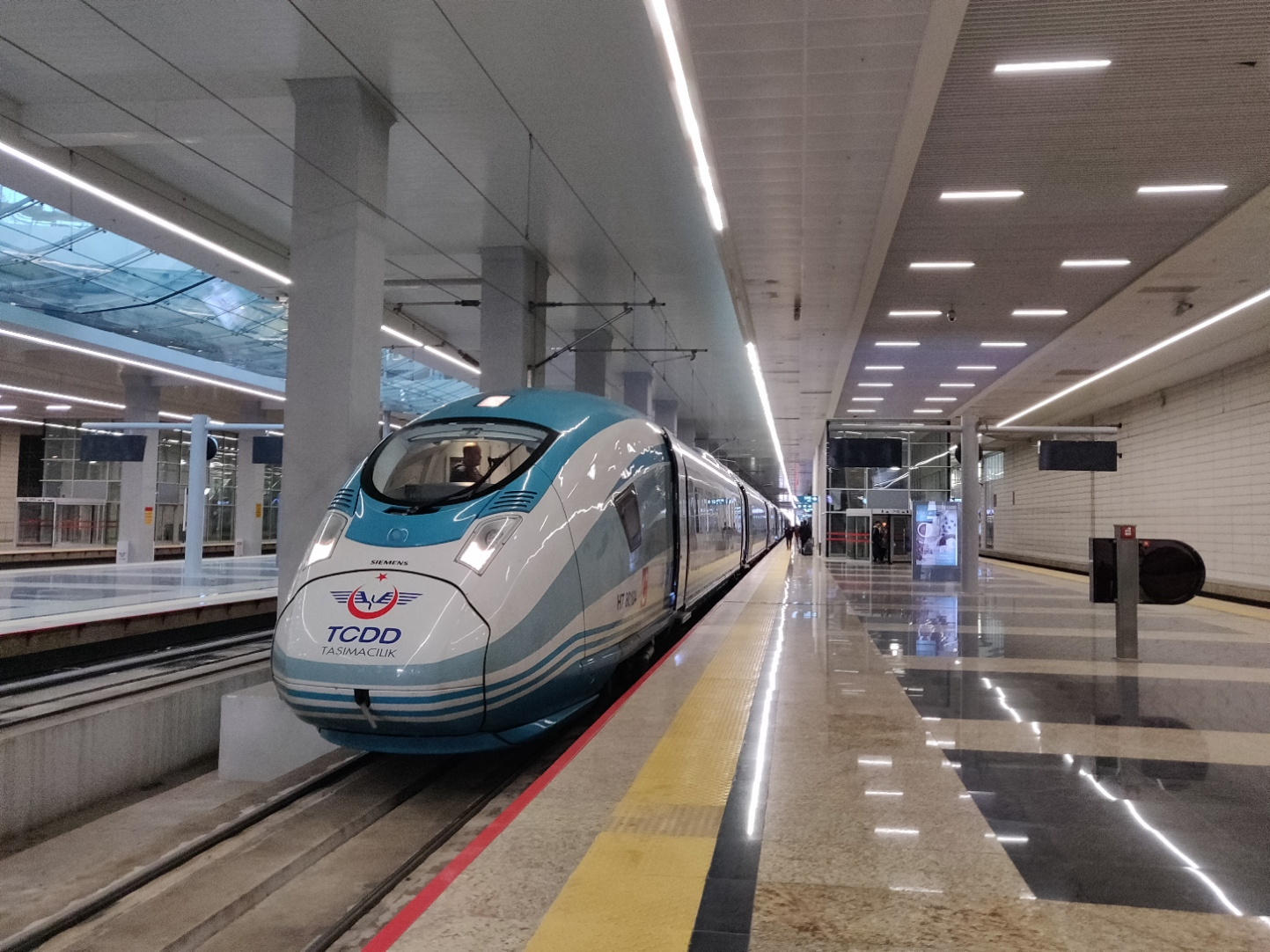
- TCDD HT80004 at the ATG terminal in Ankara
- Manufacturer: Siemens
- Built at: Krefeld, North Rhine-Westphalia, Germany
- Family name: Velaro
- Constructed: 2013–2021
- Entered service: 2015
- Number built: 19
- Number in service: 19
- Formation: 8 cars
- Fleet numbers: HT80001 (Velaro D); HT80101–HT80118 (Velaro TR)
- Capacity: 444 (HT80001); 483 (HT80101–HT80118)
- Operator: TCDD Taşımacılık
- Depot: New Etimesgut Yard
- Lines served: Ankara–Istanbul high-speed railway (on Ankara-Eskişehir route only); Polatlı–Konya high-speed railway (on Ankara-Konya route only); Ankara–Sivas high-speed railway (on Ankara-Sivas route only)

Specifications
- Train length: 200 metres (656 ft 2 in)
- Maximum speed: 320 km/h (199 mph) (HT80001); 300 km/h (186 mph) (HT80101–HT80118)
- Power output: 8,000 kW
- Power supply: Pantograph
- Electric system: 25 kV, 50 Hz AC Overhead line
- Braking system: Regenerative pneumatic brakes
- Coupling system: Scharfenberg
- Track gauge: 1,435 mm (4 ft 8 1/2 in) standard gauge

TCDD HT80000, also known as Siemens Velaro TR, is a series of high-speed electric multiple units built by Siemens for the Turkish State Railways. The EMUs are used for the Yüksek Hızlı Tren (YHT) services on the Turkish high-speed railway network and especially on the Polatlı–Konya high-speed railway, where they can reach a maximum speed of 300 km/h (186 mph).

== History ==
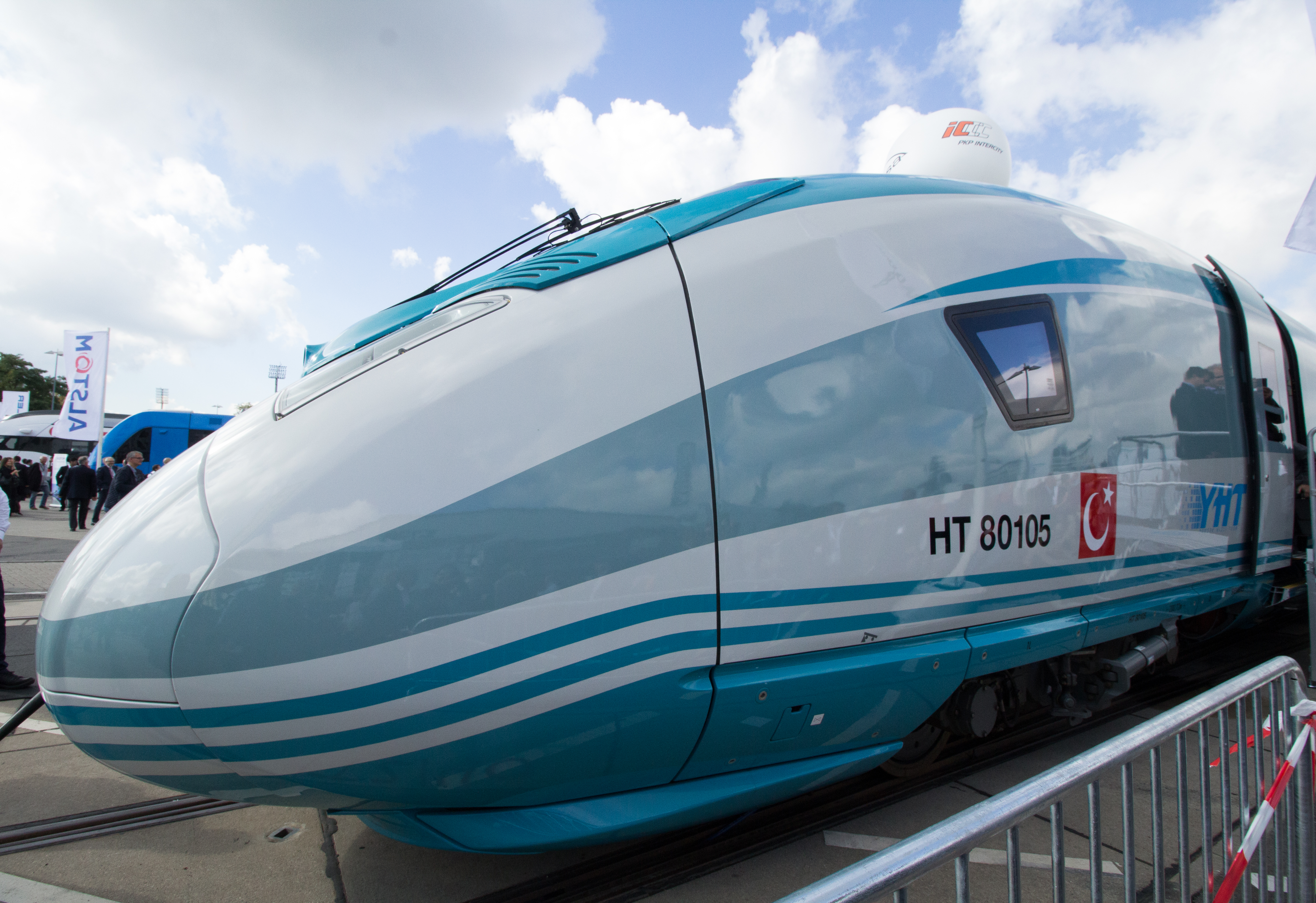
TCDD HT80105 (Velaro TR) has 483 passenger seats and can reach a top speed of 300 km/h (186 mph).

In 2013 TCDD concluded three contracts with Siemens for the acquisition of these seventeen units (1 unit for the first, 6 for the second and 10 for the last contract). Furthermore, Siemens would provide 7 years of maintenance and cleaning, and also provide a simulator. But in the end of 2014, the third contract on the last 10 sets was canceled by the Public Tender Committee of Turkey because of a missing certificate. The bids for 10 high-speed train sets were repeated on 30 January 2017 with Siemens having proposed the Velaro TR again against Alstom and CAF.

In September 2013, the first set - a train originally intended for operation in Germany - was sent east for testing. Siemens also sent a Vectron MS demonstrator locomotive along with the Velaro train to Turkey. This first unit entered service on 23 May 2015 between Ankara and Konya. The second unit (but the first produced for TCDD) departed from Germany on 29 January 2016 and reached Ankara on 17 February 2016. But the entry to service did not happen progressively and the 6 Velaro TR entered service on 10 March 2017.

=== Accidents and incidents ===
The unit HT80101 was involved in the Ankara train collision on 13 December 2018.

== Design ==
The Velaro TR is based almost entirely on existing technology from the Siemens Velaro platform. Like most, it is formed of one eight-car 200 m (656 ft 2 in) set that can be coupled with another to produce a 16-car 400 m (1,312 ft 4 in) set. Like other Velaros, the Velaro TR can operate at temperatures between −25–40 °C (−13–104 °F). Most new technical features will also be used in all future Velaro trains.

=== Visual ===
A white - turquoise - grey colour scheme has been selected for the livery of the TCDD HT80000 high-speed train sets, instead of the traditional white - red - dark blue colour scheme used on the TCDD HT65000 high-speed train sets.

The appearance of the TCDD HT80000 is closer to that of the '2nd generation' Velaro trains (e.g. Eurostar E320) as opposed to the look of older Velaros like the ICE 3M, that have the lights closer to the coupler, as opposed to the newer position against the windscreen surrounds, although if you look more closely this is the fourth stage of evolution which can be seen on the outside with the new Velaro. The door windows are larger, square windows, as opposed to the airplane style oval windows on older Velaro models. All electrical equipment is covered, that also enhances aerodynamics.

=== Technical ===
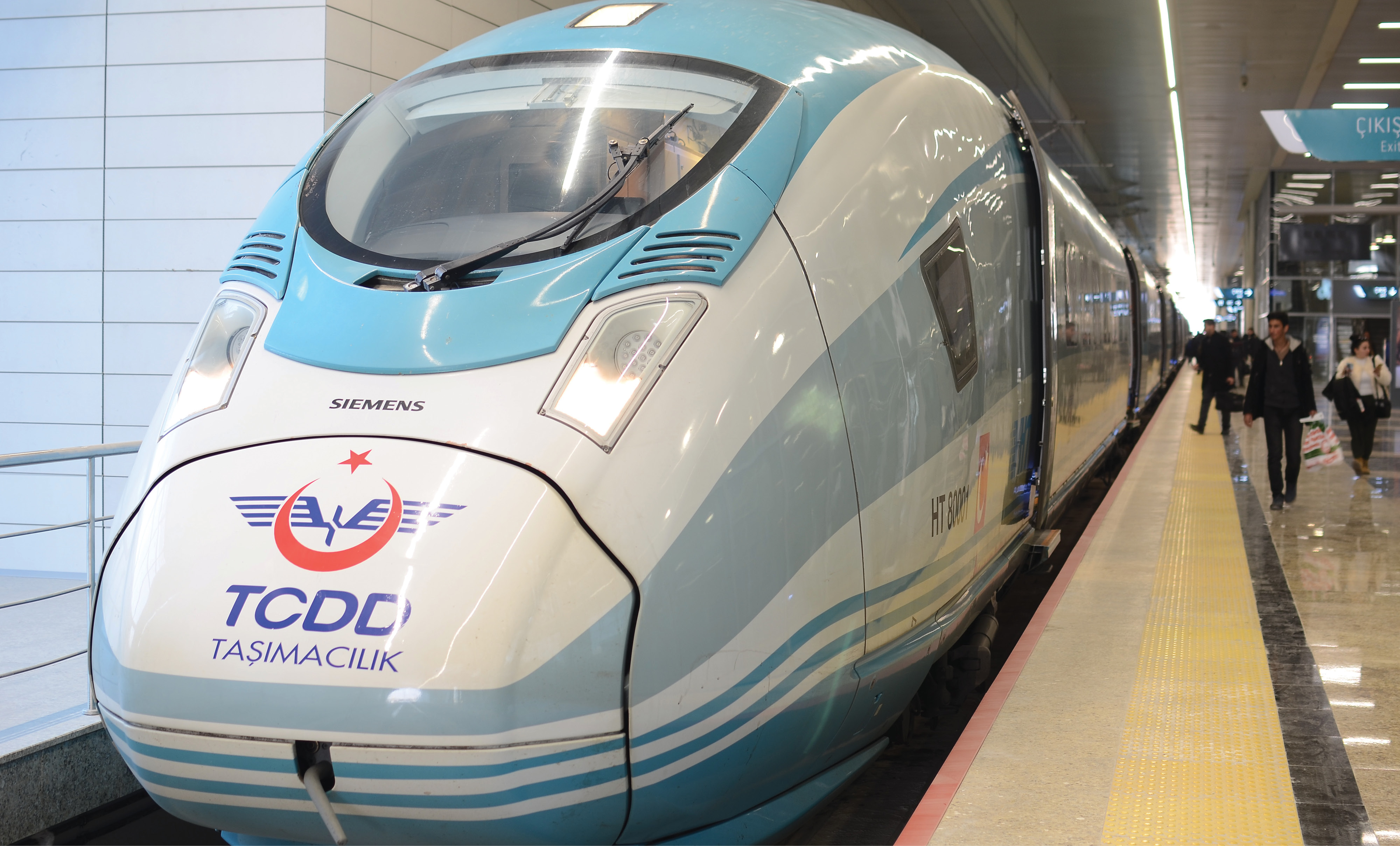
TCDD HT80001 (Velaro D) at the ATG terminal in Ankara. It has 444 passenger seats and can reach a top speed of 320 km/h (199 mph).

Each eight-car, 200 m (656 ft 2 in) set has 32 axles, of which 16 are driven. This gives the following wheel arrangement:

Bo’Bo’+2’2’+Bo’Bo’+2’2’+2’2’+Bo’Bo’+2’2’+Bo’Bo’

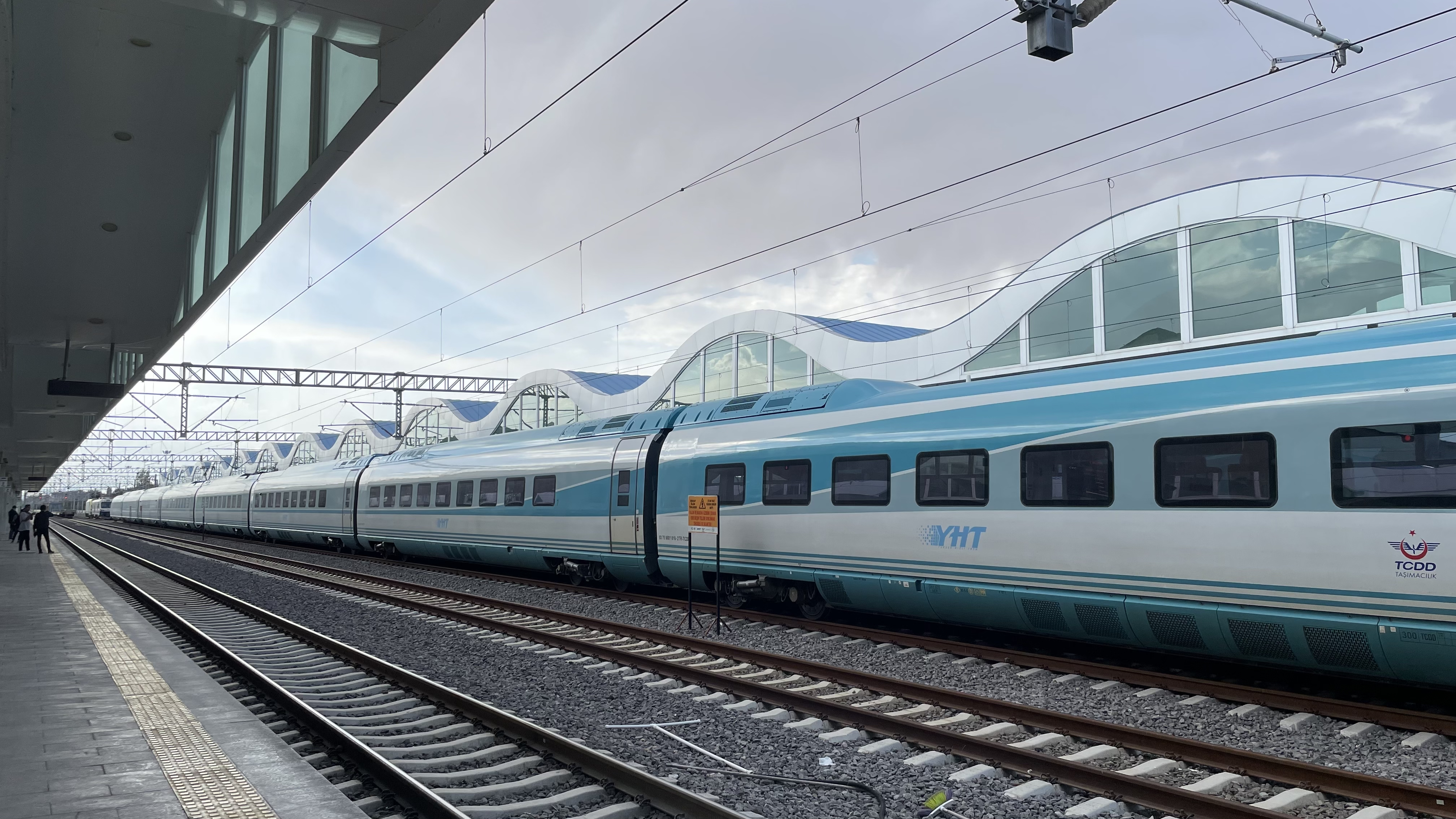
A TCDD HT80000 (Velaro TR) at the railway terminal in Eskişehir

All trains are fitted with ETCS. Siemens gained data on aerodynamics from Germany, China, Spain and Russia. A high roof from the middle portion of the end car was introduced, as it reduces sonic boom in tunnels, improves the driving friction and reduces exterior noise. Further aerodynamic improvements to the nose and spoiler means reduced CO_{2} emissions of 14 g/passenger-km. In comparison, the average CO_{2} emission of an aircraft with the same payload is 136 g/passenger-km.

As the first set (HT80001) is a Velaro D which was built according to Deutsche Bahn specifications, it differs from the rest of the trains (Velaro TR) at some points. The first set (Velaro D) can reach a maximum speed of 320 km/h (199 mph) contrary to 300 km/h (186 mph) for the following sets (Velaro TR). Their electric systems are also different: While the Velaro D can run under four different voltage systems (15 kV, 16,7 Hz AC / 25 kV, 50 Hz AC & 1.5 kV DC/ 3 kV DC), the Velaro TR is a pure 25 kV, 50 Hz AC system vehicle. Finally, their interior and number of seats are also different.

=== Interior ===
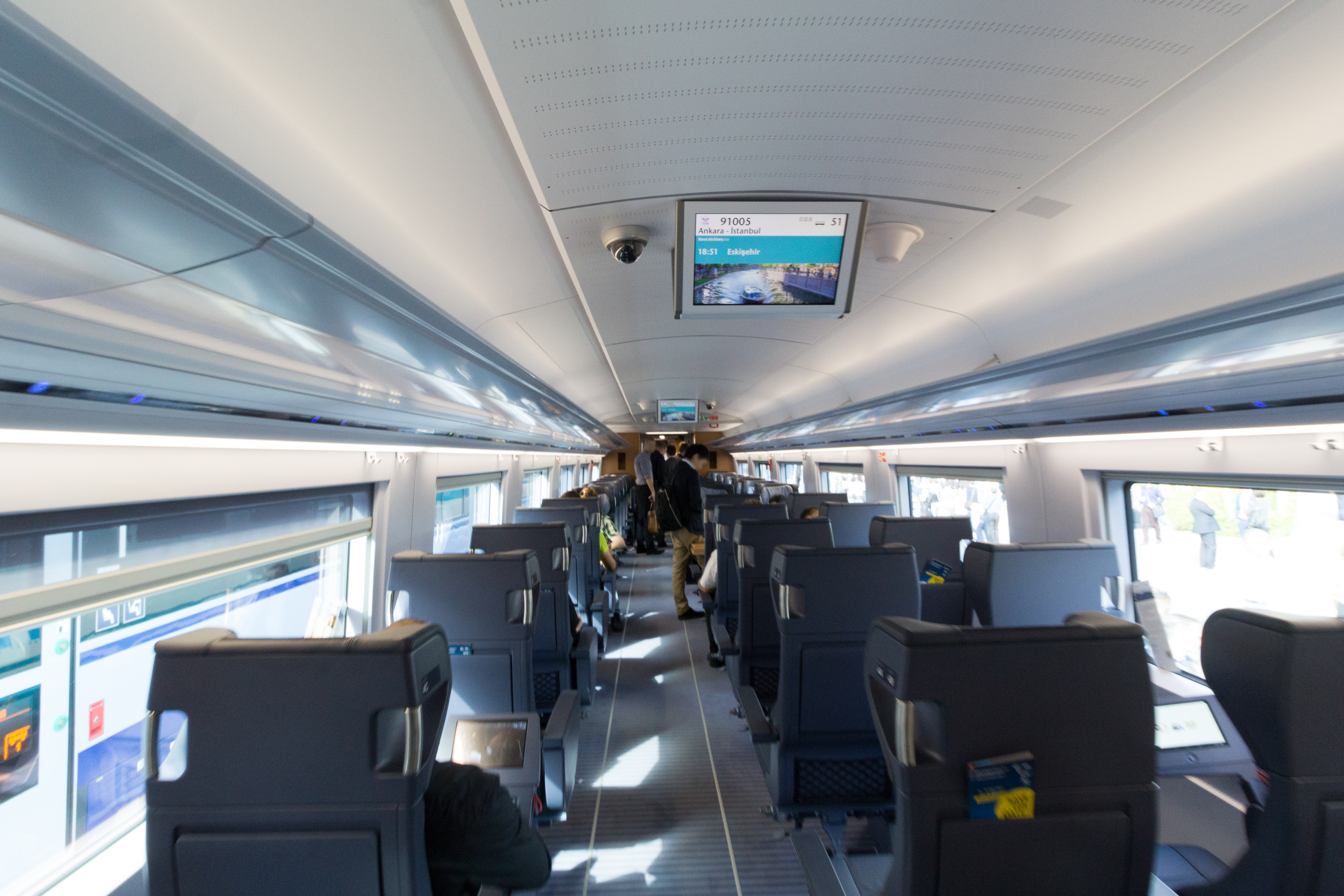
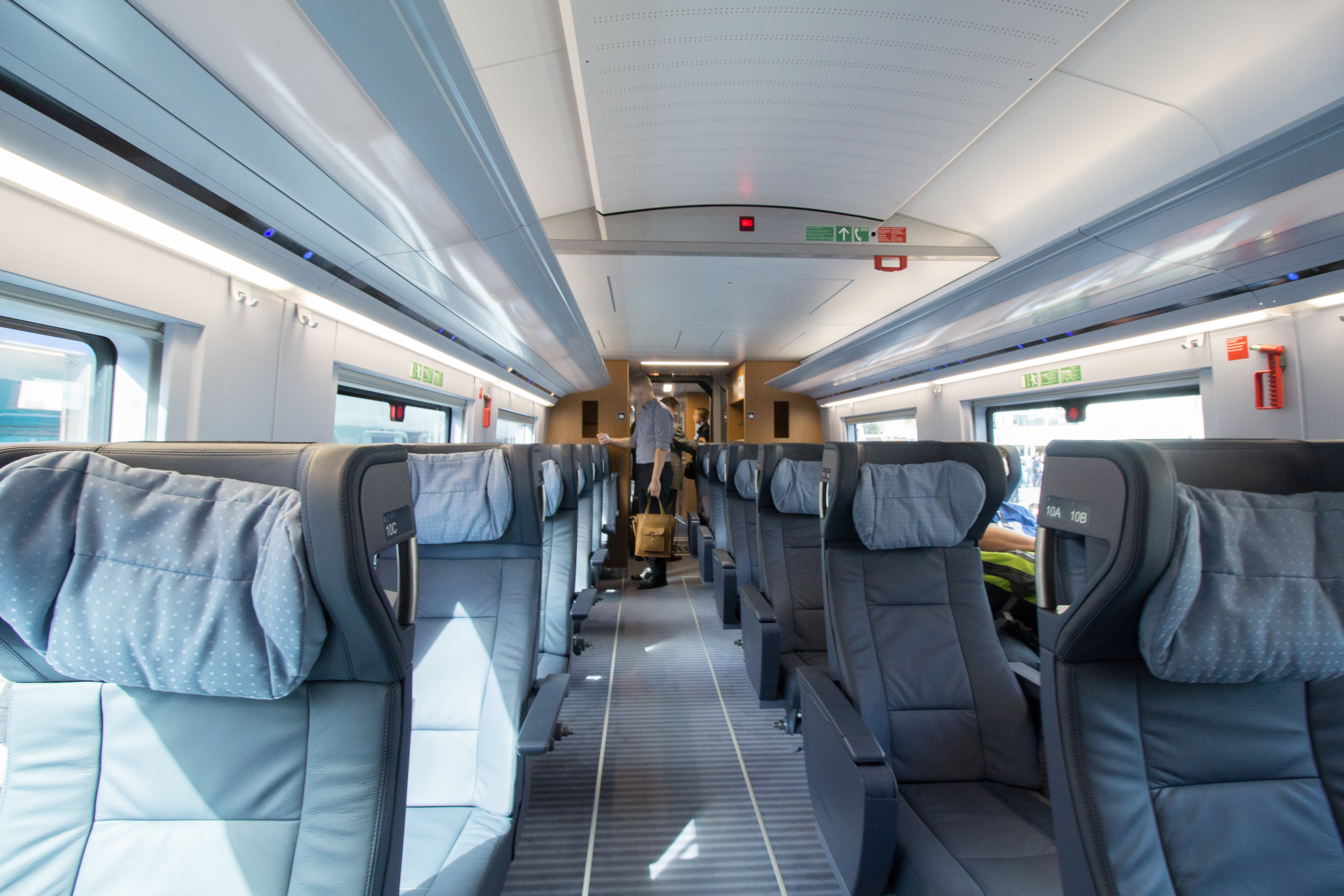
1st-class interior of a TCDD HT80000 EMU

The first set (Velaro D) has a total capacity of 460 places (333 seats in Economy class, 111 seats in First class, and a bistro with 16 seats). The following sets (Velaro TR) have a different configuration: 45 seats in First class, 424 seats in Economy class, 2 seats for disabled passengers, a Business class with 3 compartments of 4 seats (12 seats in total), and a bistro with 36 seats, for a total capacity of 519 places. First class seats have a personal media screen.

== See also ==
- TCDD HT65000
- Yüksek Hızlı Tren
- High-speed rail in Turkey
- Turkish State Railways
- List of high speed trains
