= Yüksek Hızlı Tren =

Turkish high-speed rail service

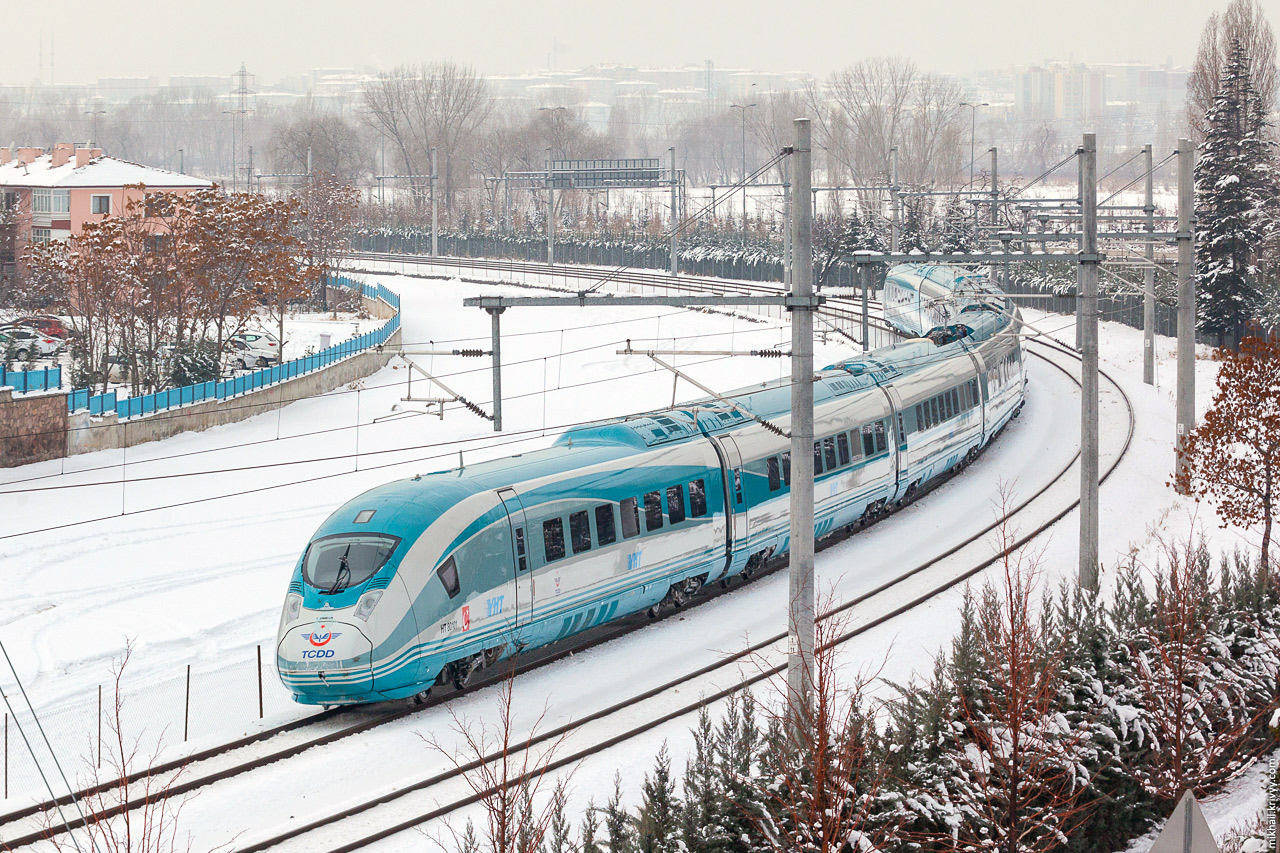
- A high-speed train set in Ankara

Overview
- Service type: High-speed rail
- Status: Operating
- Locale: Northwest, Central Anatolia
- Predecessor: Mavi Tren; Başkent Ekspresi; Anadolu Ekspresi; Meram Ekspresi; Ankara Express; Cumhuriyet Ekspresi
- First service: 13 March 2009
- Current operator: TCDD Taşımacılık
- Former operator: Turkish State Railways
- Ridership: 12.4 million (2024)

Route
- Termini: Ankara; Istanbul or Karaman or Sivas
- Distance travelled: 1,385 km (860.6 mi)
- Average journey time: 1 hour, 50 minutes
- Service frequency: 15x Daily (Ankara-Istanbul); 6x Westbound 3x Eastbound(Ankara-Eskisehir); 4x Daily (Ankara-Konya); 4x Daily (Istanbul-Konya); 2x Daily (Ankara-Karaman); 2x Daily (Ankara-Sivas); 1x Daily (Istanbul-Karaman; 1x Daily (Istanbul-Sivas)

On-board services
- Classes: First, business and economy class
- Disabled access: Fully accessible
- Catering facilities: On-board café, and at-seat meals (depending on the route)
- Entertainment facilities: On-board television with feature films
- Baggage facilities: Checked baggage available at selected stations

Technical
- Track gauge: 1,435 mm (4 ft 8 1/2 in) standard gauge
- Electrification: 25 kV 50 Hz AC
- Operating speed: 300 km/h (186 mph) maximum
- Track owner: Turkish State Railways

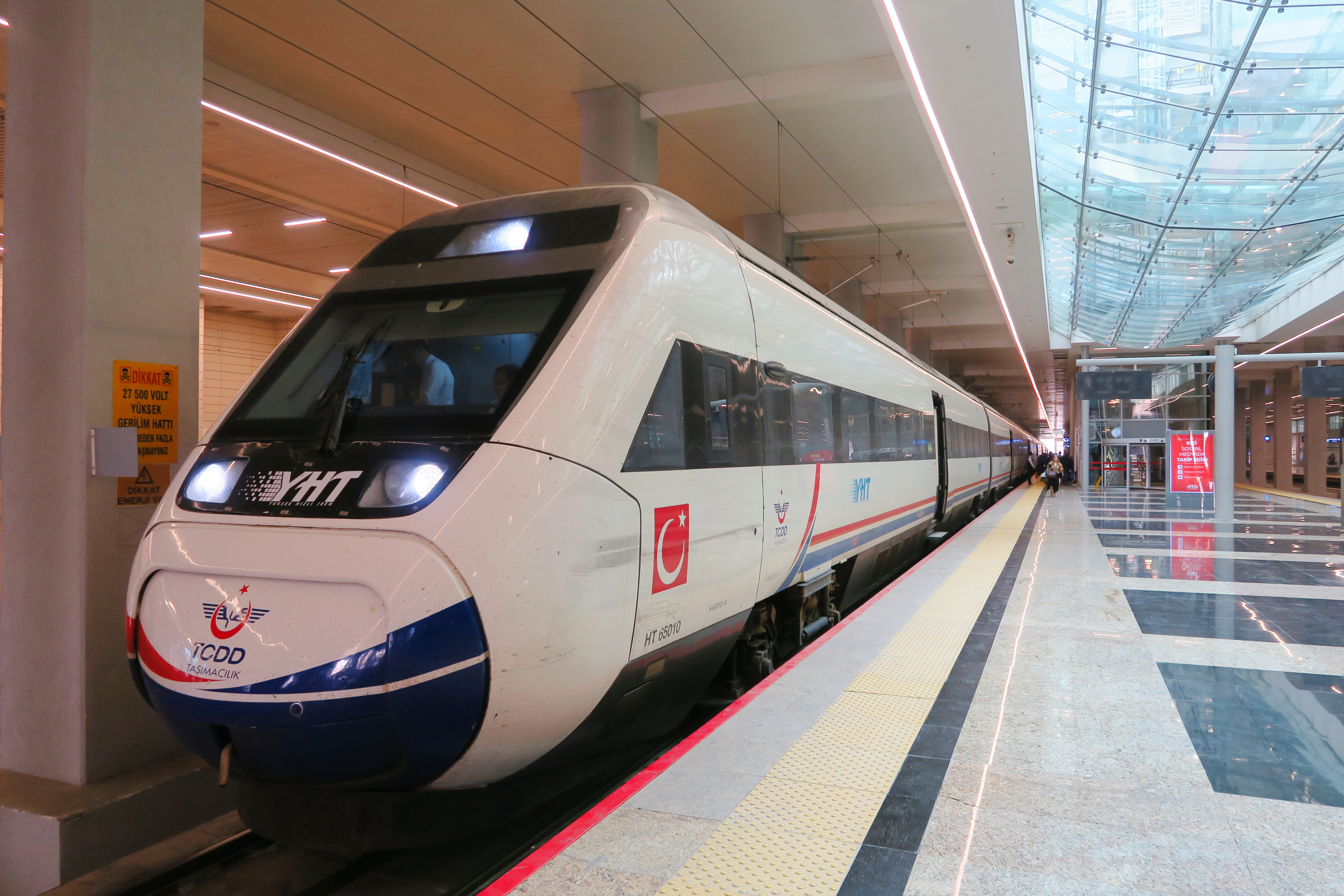
A TCDD HT65000 at the ATG terminal in Ankara

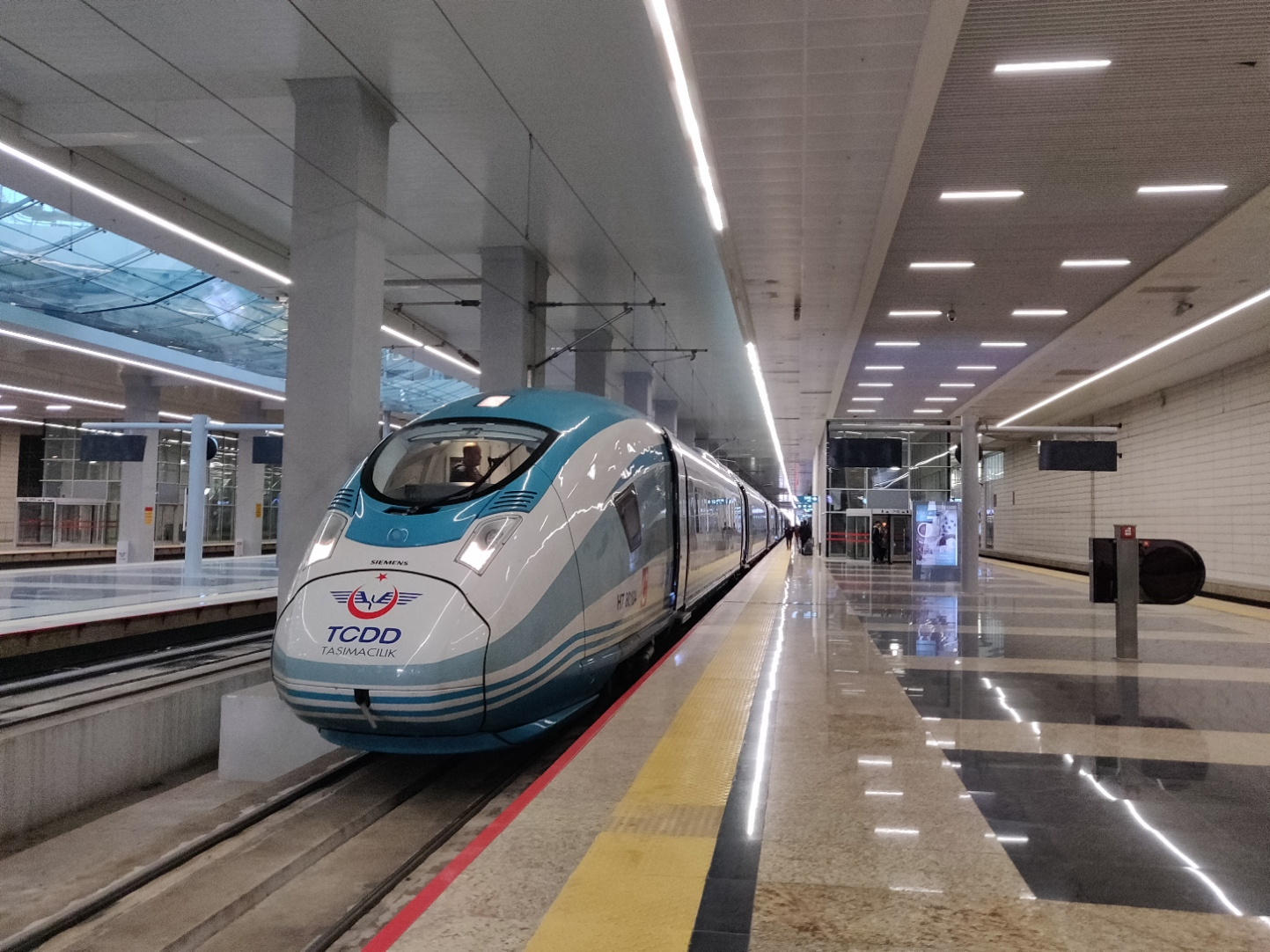
A TCDD HT80000 at the ATG terminal in Ankara

Yüksek Hızlı Tren or YHT (English: High Speed Train), operated by TCDD Transport, is the high-speed rail service in Turkey. Branded as "YHT", they are TCDD Transport's flagship passenger train service and the only high-speed rail service in the country. As of 2025, the network spans 1,385 km (860.6 mi) and serves major cities like Istanbul, Ankara, Eskişehir, İzmit, Konya, and Sivas. Expansion of the system is underway and the network is expected to reach Edirne, Afyonkarahisar, Adana, and İzmir in the 2020s.

High-speed rail in Turkey was originally planned to be built as early as 1975, but it wasn't until 2003 that the construction of the Ankara-Istanbul high-speed railway began. On 13 March 2009, the first phase of the high-speed railway, Ankara–Istanbul line, entered service between Ankara and Eskişehir. On 25 July 2014, the Ankara-Istanbul high-speed railway services began to reach the Pendik railway station on the Asian side of Istanbul, and on 13 March 2019 the services began to reach the Halkalı railway station on the European side of Istanbul, passing through the Marmaray railway tunnel under the Bosphorus strait. There were initially 6 daily departures in both directions.

It has two types of EMU train models operating at speeds of up to 250 km/h (155 mph) (HT65000) or 300 km/h (186 mph) (HT80000).

On 13 March 2009, the first phase of the high-speed railway, Ankara–Istanbul line, entered service between Ankara and Eskişehir. On 25 July 2014, the Ankara-Istanbul high-speed railway services began to reach the Pendik railway station on the Asian side of Istanbul, and on 13 March 2019 the services began to reach the Halkalı railway station on the European side of Istanbul, passing through the Marmaray railway tunnel under the Bosphorus strait. There were initially 6 daily departures in both directions.

As of 2026, the current length of the high-speed service stands at 1300km and another 1560km under construction, reaching 11 cities with 15 more cities on the line. All lines are compliant with ETCS Level 2 while some lines additionally retain Level 1 for legacy support. Being the 6th longest network in the world, high speed trains have carried over 100 million passengers and nearly 100 million kilometers since 2009. The 2053 Strategic Plan of the Ministry of Transport and Infrastructure envisions a 6.196km of high-speed rail, connecting 52 cities with locally manufactured trainsets and signalization solutions.

== History ==
Istanbul and Ankara are Turkey's largest two cities, having a combined population over 20 million. Transportation demand between the two cities is expectedly high. The Otoyol 4 motorway is a major highway between the two cities, and the Ankara–Istanbul route is the busiest domestic air route in the country. The route between Istanbul and Ankara by rail has been a single-track line, and trains usually were delayed 30 minutes to 2 hours plus the average 7 hours, 30 minutes travel time. Rail transport in Turkey was already at its lowest point, so in 2003 the State Railways and the Turkish Ministry of Transport made an agreement to build a 533 km (331 mi) line between the two cities. The line would be an electrified double trackline. Construction began in 2004 from Esenkent to Eskişehir. The line was completed on 23 April 2007.

On 28 February 2007 TCDD requested bids for high-speed train sets from other networks to be tested on the completed portion of the high-speed line.

On 30 March 2007, TCDD signed an agreement with Trenitalia of Ferrovie dello Stato to rent an ETR 500 train set for 4 months for testing the system.

The first run was from Haydarpaşa Terminal in Istanbul to the Central Station in Ankara, using the completed portion of the high-speed line between Hasanbey and Esenkent.

On 14 September 2007 the ETR 500 Y2 set a speed record in Turkey, reaching 303 km/h (188.3 mph). This test received extensive media coverage in Turkey.

On 20 November 2007 the first TCDD HT65000 high-speed train sets purchased from CAF of Spain entered Turkey from the Kapıkule border station in Edirne, and tests were subsequently made with these trains prior to the commencement of services on 13 March 2009.

In 2010 one of the YHT trains was converted into a test train in order to test and measure the new lines. The Transportation Ministry spent 14 million TL (around 7 million Euros at that time) for the installation of testing and measuring equipment on the train, which it named – because it is a tradition to give a name to test trains – as "Piri Reis" after the renowned Turkish admiral and cartographer who drew some of the most accurate and detailed maps of the Mediterranean Sea and the Americas in the early 16th century.

TCDD requested bids for the name of the high-speed service. Out of over 100 entries, the ones with the highest votes were: Türk Yıldızı (Turkish Star), Turkuaz (Turquoise), Yüksek Hızlı Tren (High Speed Train), Çelik Kanat (Steel Wing) and Yıldırım (Lightning). TCDD chose Yüksek Hızlı Tren to be the name of the service.

On 13 March 2009, the inauguration ceremony took place in Ankara; attended by President Abdullah Gül, Prime Minister Recep Tayyip Erdoğan, and Minister of Transport Binali Yıldırım, who started the first phase of the YHT service running between Ankara and Eskişehir.

== Ridership ==
Ridership
Year	million riders	±% p.a.
2011	2.56	—
2012	3.35	+30.86%
2013	4.21	+25.67%
2014	5.09	+20.90%
2015	5.69	+11.79%
2016	5.9	+3.69%
2017	7.1	+20.34%
2018	8.1	+14.08%
2019	8.3	+2.47%
2020	2.8	−66.27%
2021	4.3	+53.57%
2022	9.3	+116.28%
2023	11.8	+26.88%
2024	12.4	+5.08%

Until 2015, ridership had grown at the expense of TCDD's regular train services and has not dented air traffic demand. Total TCDD services including HSR remain flat. Traffic was affected since 2012 when all services to Istanbul were suspended. A sharp increase in ridership occurred after extra high speed trains started operation. A further increase in 2018 and 2019 is expected with new trainsets becoming operational and the opening of the Istanbul terminals Halkali and Haydarpaşa.

== Lines in operation ==
Rail transport map of Turkey

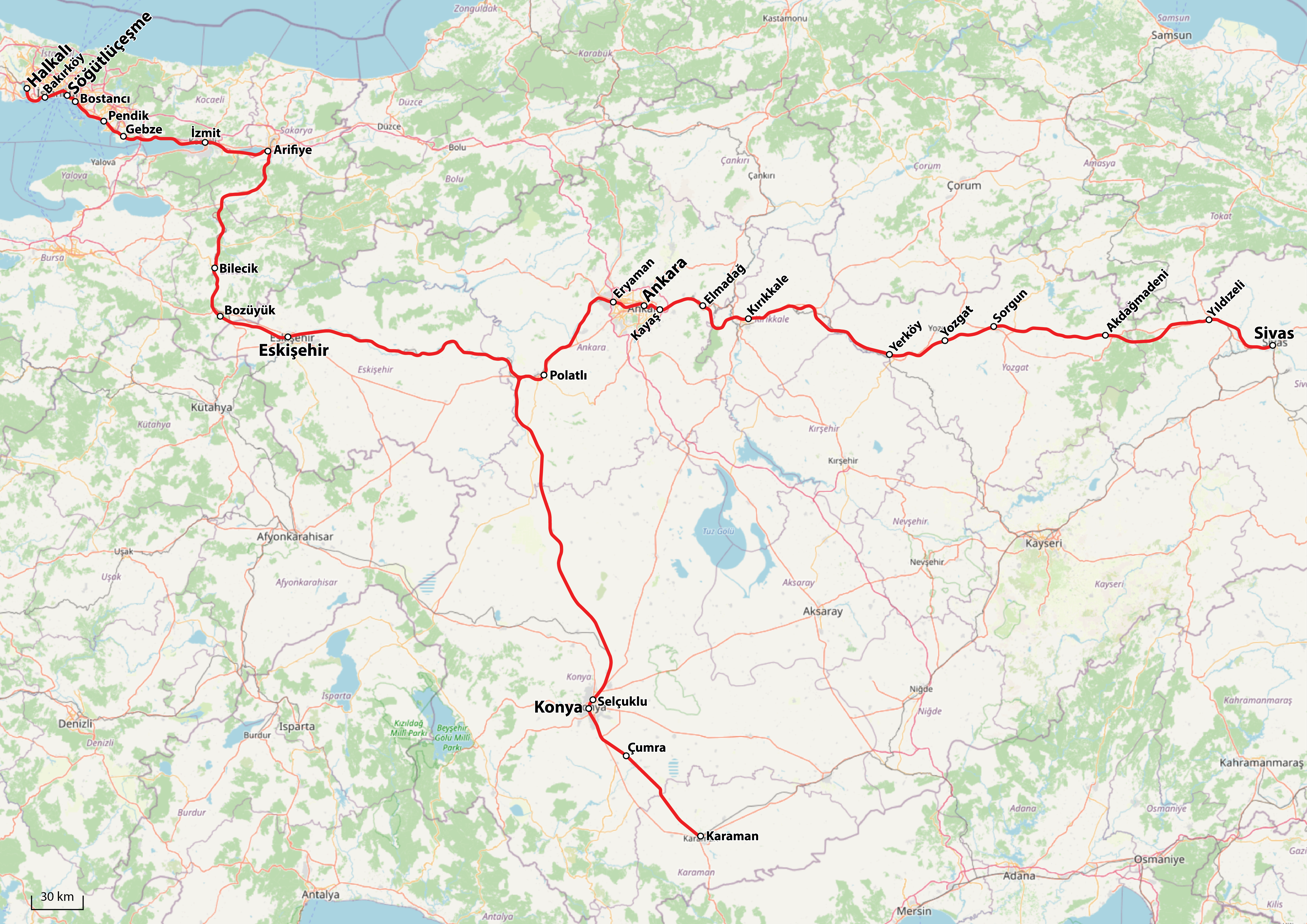
Map of operating YHT services as of 2023.

=== Ankara–Istanbul ===
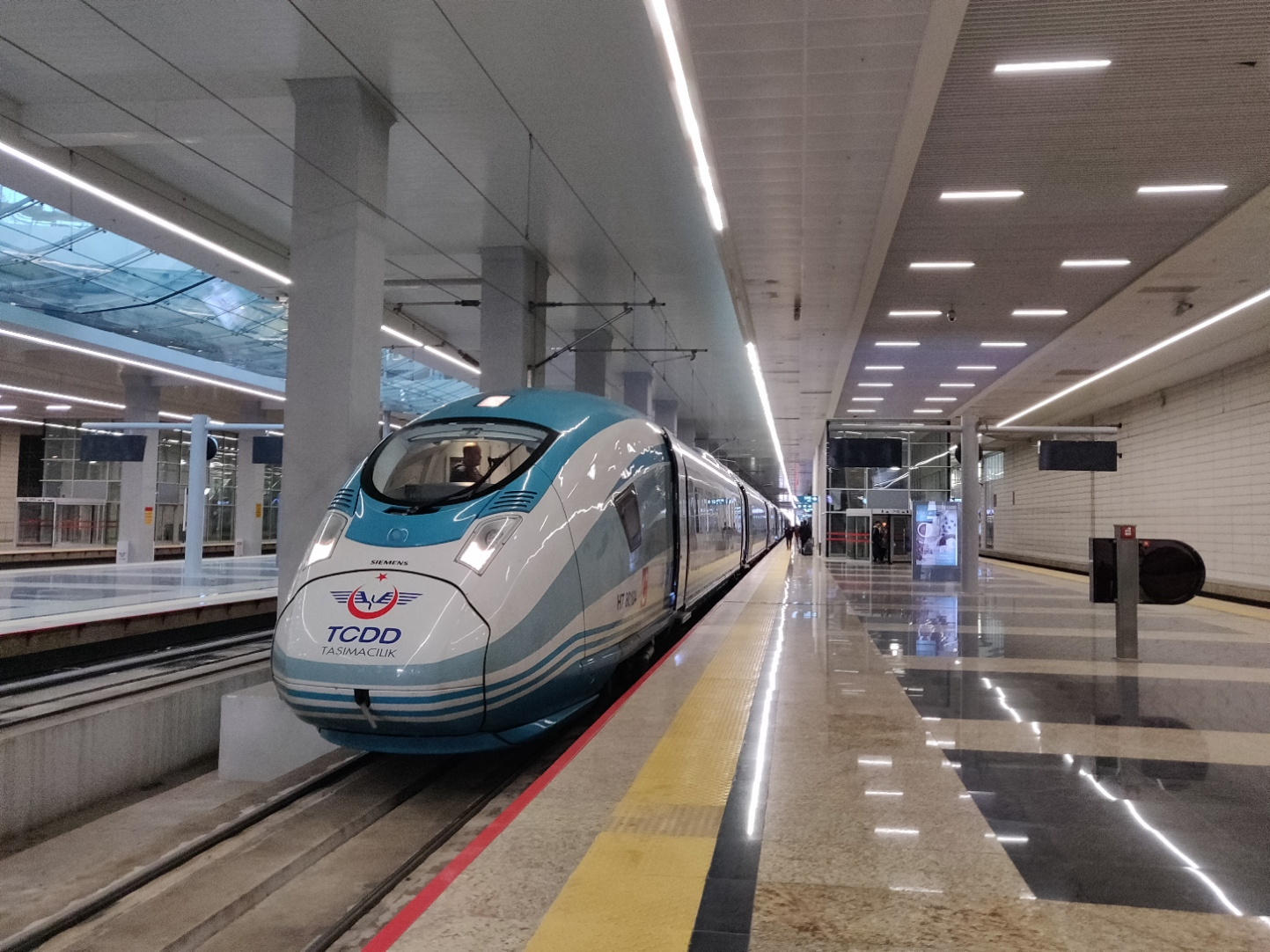
A TCDD HT80000 at the ATG terminal in Ankara

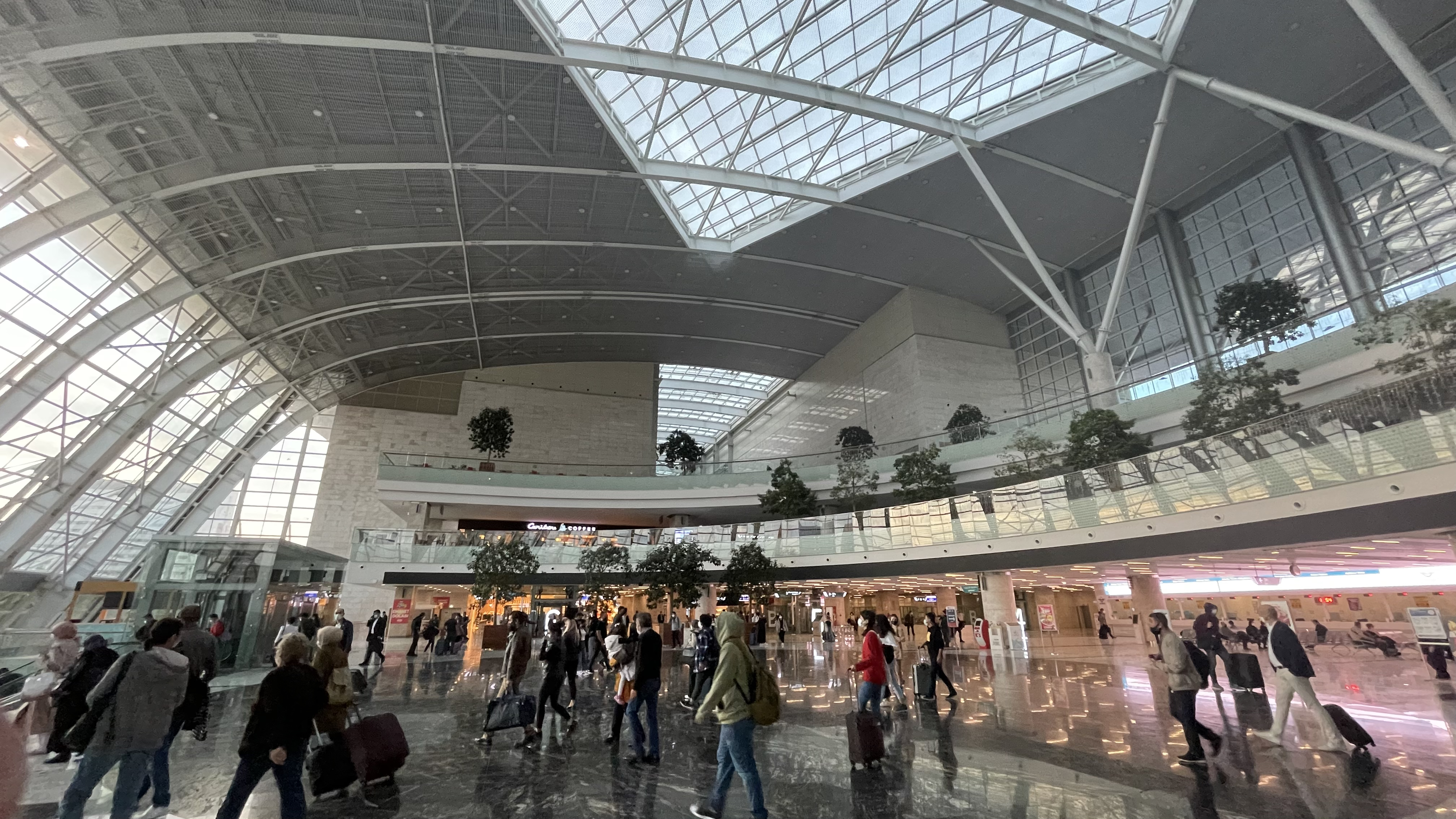
The ATG terminal in Ankara is a hub for the YHT services of the Turkish State Railways

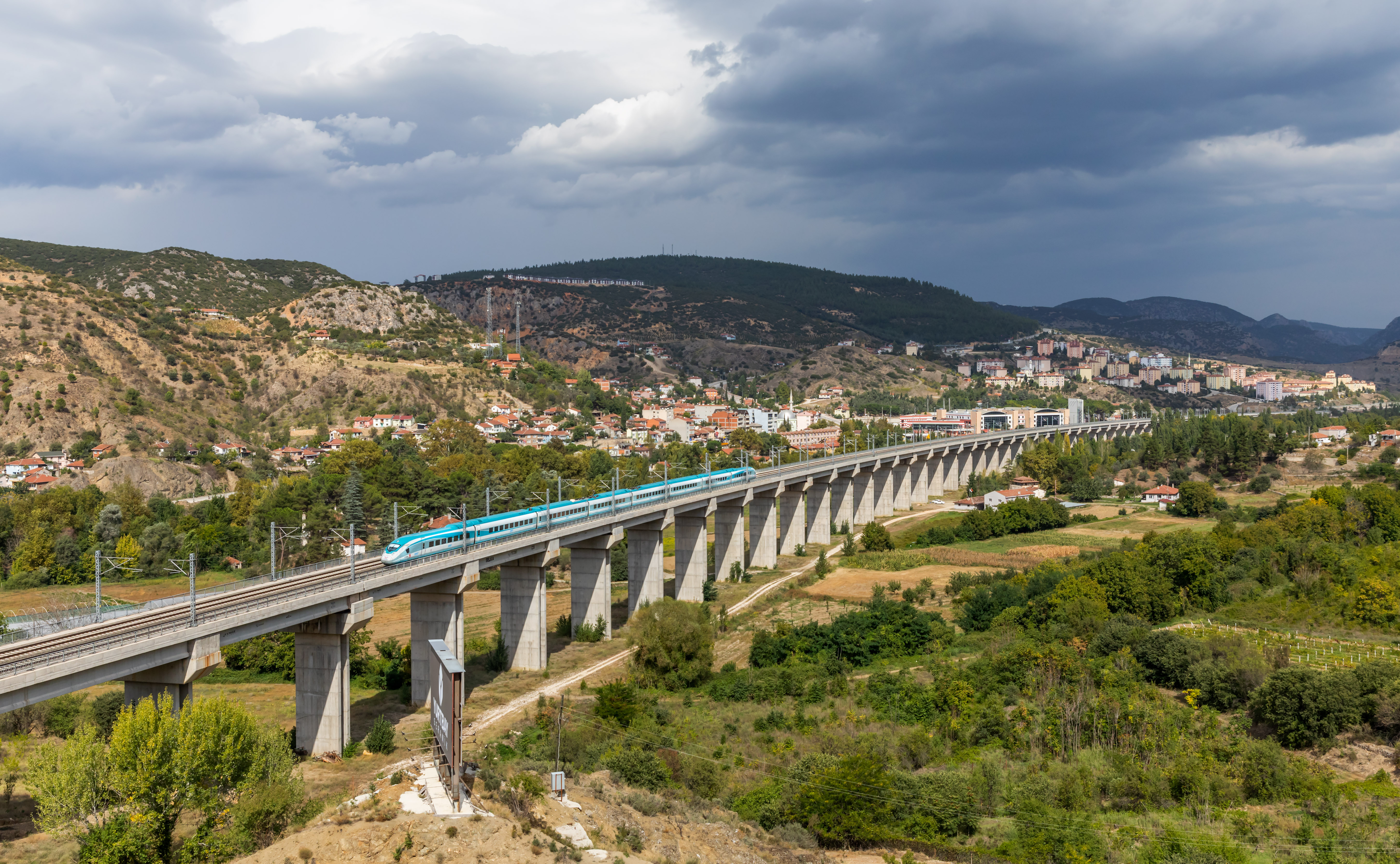
A TCDD HT80000 high-speed train (Siemens Velaro) traveling from Ankara to Istanbul in Bilecik, Türkiye

Prior to the introduction of the high-speed line, the population centres of Istanbul (14 million) and Ankara (5 million) were connected by a 576 km (358 mi) long railway line, of which only 110 km (68 mi) was double-tracked. The whole line was electrified, but low radius turns and poor track quality made high-speed rail transport impossible. Prior to the upgrading of this line in 2006, the railway's market share of Istanbul–Ankara passenger transit was 10%, with a travel time of ~6.5 hours.

The Ankara–Istanbul HST line opened on 25 July 2014, with all trains terminating at Pendik, which is 1 hour by bus from Kadikoy in the eastern suburbs of Istanbul. There are 12 trips per day and the journey takes 3.5 hours. All trains stop at Eskişehir and İzmit.

==== Design and construction ====
The high-speed railway connects the county's largest metropolises, Ankara the capital and conurbation of Istanbul via Eskişehir, with a junction at Polatlı to the Ankara-Konya high-speed line.

The railway link was built by a Chinese-Turkish consortium, which was formed when the China Railway Construction Corporation and the China National Machinery Import and Export Corporation won the bid in 2005 to build the railway line in partnership with two Turkish companies, Cengiz Construction and Ibrahim Cecen Ictas Construction.

The line is 533 km (331 mi) long, double tracked, electrified, and signalled, to ETCS level 1 standard and is independent of the original Ankara to Istanbul line. The design speed is 250 km/h (155 mph).

The first part of the line to be constructed (Phase 1) was the Ankara–Eskişehir section, specifically between Sincan and İnönü, scheduled to open in 2006.

The second phase was scheduled to open in 2008 and included more difficult terrain which covers the path between İnönü and Köseköy, extending to Gebze close to Istanbul. The service in this line is expected to start on 25 July 2014. A part of the route has not been completed yet by the time of opening, so conventional line will be used until the completion of the project.

Ankara–Istanbul high-speed line construction
Line section	Length (km)	Start / opening date (Note: Start of construction / Official opening)	Notes
Ankara–Sincan	24		As of 2009, the existing track between Ankara and Esenkent is used until the completion of a dedicated high-speed line As of 2013, one track of high-speed line has been completed between Ankara and Sincan and it is being used with reduced signalling features
Sincan–Esenkent	15	2008–2010	This section has been opened in 2010 with full signalling features
Esenkent–Eskişehir	206	2004–2009	Infrastructure includes: 2 road bridges and 30 road underpasses, 7 railway bridges, and 13 river crossings. 4 viaducts (total length over 4 km (2.5 mi)), and 1 tunnel (471 m (1,545 ft)). First test runs in April 2007.
Eskişehir station	3.4 km	2008–	To avoid congestion problems in the city of Eskişehir, a tunnel and cutting project is being undertaken. 2,240 m (7,350 ft) of covered tunnel consisting of 2 high-speed lines, 2 conventional lines, and 1 freight line, plus 1,151 m (3,776 ft) of excavated track (U shape) with 2 high-speed tracks and 1 freight track. Eskisehir station infrastructure works have already started
Eskişehir–Inönü	30		Officially opened on 25 July 2014.
Inönü–Vezirhan	54		Officially opened on 25 July 2014.
Vezirhan–Köseköy	104		Officially opened on 25 July 2014.
Köseköy–Pendik	56		Officially opened on 25 July 2014.
Pendik–Söğütlüçeşme–Halkalı	43		Opened 12 March 2019 together with the Marmaray project.
Söğütlüçeşme–Haydarpaşa (Istanbul)	2		Pending completion of repairs.

==== Operation and rolling stock ====
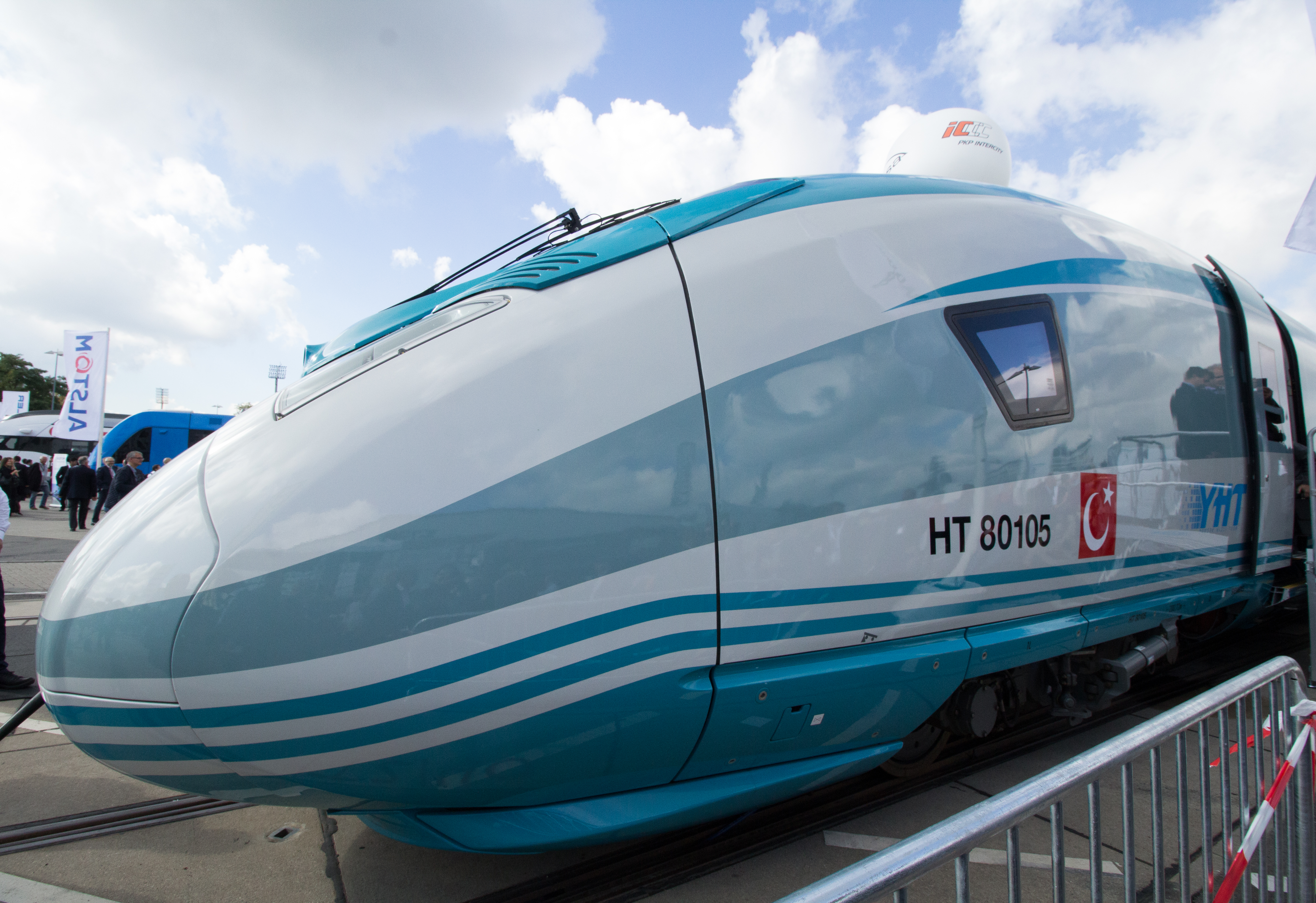
TCDD HT80000 (Siemens Velaro TR) has a maximum operating speed of 300 km/h (186 mph)

The Ankara to Eskişehir section officially opened on 13 March 2009.

On 13 November 2009, a high-speed train derailed near Eskişehir.

On 25 July 2014, Istanbul–Ankara high-speed train service started. The stretch was not completed yet, thus service started using conventional line for some parts, which causes a little longer trip than envisaged. Initially, 8 trains departed every day in both directions, and the final station in Istanbul was Pendik, a district in east of Istanbul. Other public-transport connections, such as buses, were organized to connect Pendik to the city proper.

The line from Ankara to Eskişehir was initially operated by Turkish State Railways with the TCDD HT65000 six-car train sets constructed by the Construcciones y Auxiliar de Ferrocarriles (CAF) of Spain. Additionally, TCDD bought seven Siemens Velaro sets for the Ankara–Istanbul line. Moreover, in 2013 TCDD opened a new tender for 106 new sets to be supplied in 5 years, but this tender was later cancelled, and a new tender opened in 2018.

=== Ankara–Konya ===
The second high-speed line construction project in Turkey was a line from Polatlı on the Ankara to Istanbul line to Konya.

Prior to the construction of the line, journeys between Ankara and Konya took over 10 hours, travelling from Ankara via Eskişehir and Afyon, with a total length of nearly 1,000 km (621 mi). (Note: There was no direct connection between Ankara and Konya by rail) The new high-speed line is 306 km (190 mi) in length, with a journey time of 1 hour and 15 minutes. 212 km (132 mi) of new track is constructed via Polatlı and Konya, with a design permitting up to 350 km/h (217 mph) of high-speed rail transport. ETCS Level 2 will be used.

Construction was split into two phases: Phase 1 was the 100 km (62 mi) section and Phase 2 was the 112 km (70 mi) section between Polatlı and Konya.

Ankara–Konya high-speed line construction
Line section	Length (km)	Start/opening date	Notes
Ankara–Polatlı junction	98 km	2004–2009	Constructed as part of the Ankara to Istanbul high-speed line, on the Sincan – Eskişehir section
Phase 1 Polatlı via Kocahacılı to the 100 km mark	100 km	2007–2011	An estimated cost increase of 20% due to weak ground
Phase 2 from 100 km mark to Konya	112 km	2006–2011	

The line includes a tunnel of 2,030m. The first test train ran in December 2010; Revenue services began on 24 August 2011. Currently, same CAF trains which are used on Ankara–Eskisehir line are running on this line with 250 km/h maximum speed. In the future, TCDD will procure 6 more sets with up to 350 km/h. The journey time between the two cities (Ankara–Konya) is 1 and a half hours, dropping to 1 hour and 15 minutes in the future. Previously the journey time was 10 hours and 30 minutes. There are 10 trains a day, though this will rise to one per hour in the future.

=== Konya-Karaman ===
This 102 km high-speed line opened on 8 January 2022. The Konya-Karaman high-speed line has been designed for a speed of 200 km/h.

=== Ankara–Sivas high-speed line ===
More than half of the budgeted investment has been done by 2014, and was planned to open in late-2021.

Prior to the construction of the high-speed line, the railway line length between Ankara and Sivas was 602 km (374 mi), primarily single-tracked, with a travel time of 12 hours. The travel time is cut to 2 hours and 51 minutes The line is double-tracked and have a length of 465 km (289 mi) eastwards from Ankara to Sivas via Kırıkkale, Yerköy and Yozgat and constructed for the most part to the same 250 km/h (155 mph) operational design like other high speed lines except Konya-Karaman line. The infrastructure includes 6 viaducts (with a total length over 3 km (1.9 mi)), 11 tunnels (including one of ~3 km (1.9 mi) in length), and 67 bridges. A 2019 update predicted service in 2022, 3 years behind schedule due to "geographic difficulties", but the project returned to the prior opening date of 2020 summer. In 2022, the Minister of Transport announced the opening of the line by the end of the year, as it is 99% complete in the spring.

The route study was completed by the end of 2006, and put up for tender in two parts; separated at the 174 km (108 mi) mark from Ankara at Yerköy.

The line was inaugurated on 26 April 2023.

Ankara – Sivas high-speed line construction
Line section	Length (km)	Start / opening date	Notes
Ankara–Kırıkkale	88	2013 – April 2023	Plans are revised due to that previous plans includes short sections of less than high-speed running due to small radius curve sections of track in the Ankara to Kırıkkale section. Inaugurated on 26 April 2023.
Kırıkkale–Yerköy	86	2013 – April 2023	Tender is completed in 2012. Inaugurated on 26 April 2023.
Yerköy–Sivas	291	2009–April 2023	7 tunnels over 10 km in total length and 4 viaducts over 2.7 km in total length. Tender for construction of groundwork awarded in 2008. 7 stations to be built: 3 between Yerköy and Doğakent, and 4 between Doğakent and Sivas, to be separately tendered. Inaugurated on April 26, 2023.

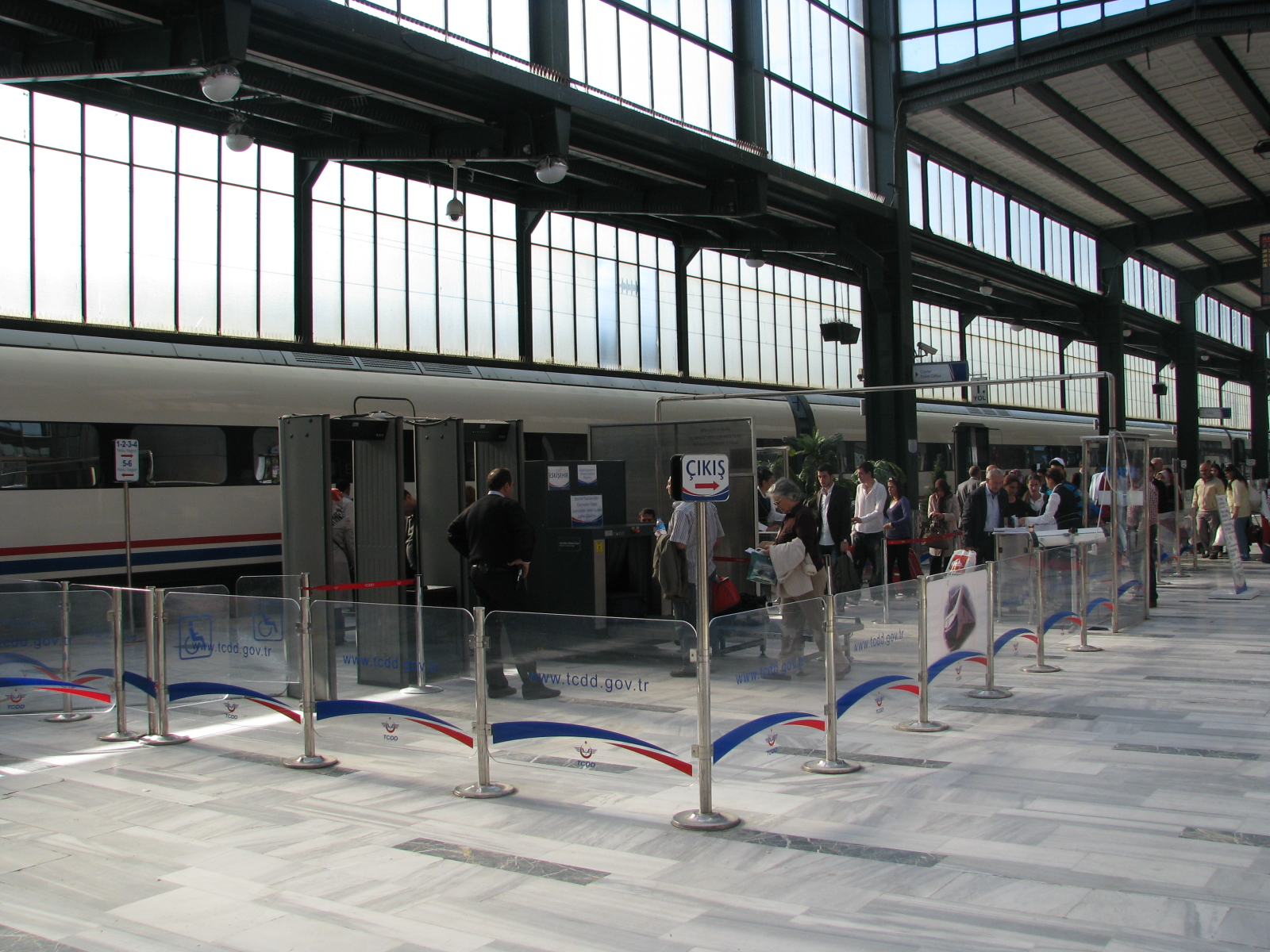
A TCDD HT65000 at the Ankara Central Station

== Lines under construction and planning phase ==
Turkey has aimed to have 3400 miles of high speed track as part of its overall railway network by 2025.

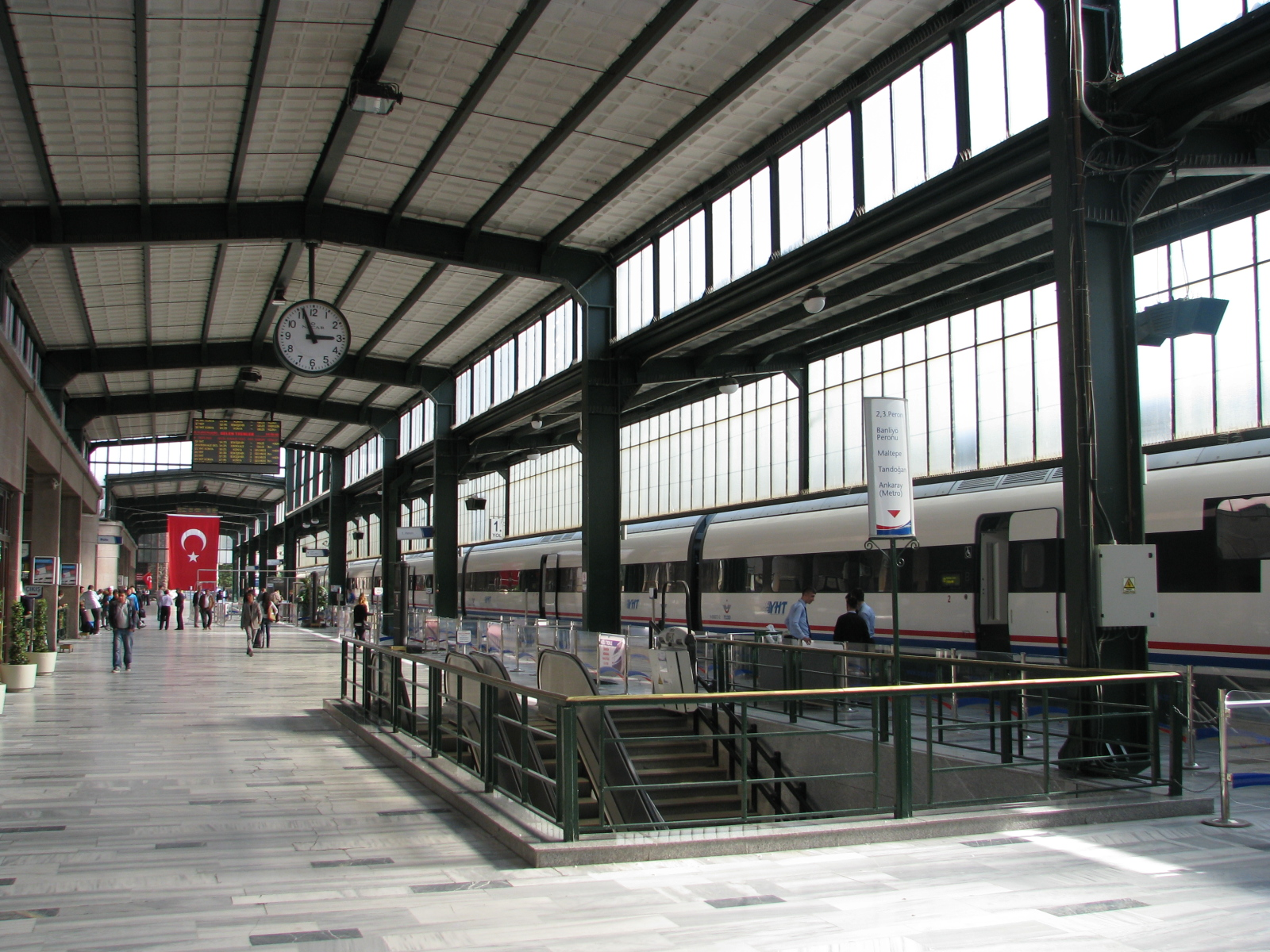
A TCDD HT65000 at the Ankara Central Station

=== Sivas–Kars ===
An extension eastwards to Kars from the Ankara – Sivas line is planned (a feasibility study done in 2006), passing through Erzincan and Erzurum. The line is expected to be built in three phases. It will be electrified and double-tracked based on the 250 km/h standard.

The design study for the Sivas–Erzincan section was completed by Italian-based SWS Engineering in July 2021. The project will include 59 bridges totaling 17 km (11 mi), and 35 tunnels totaling 170 km (106 mi) through a region with high seismicity and difficult hydrogeological conditions. The 247 km (153 mi) section will start from the current station in Sivas, through Hafik, Zara, Imranli, Refahiye, and end in Erzincan.

=== Ankara-Kayseri ===
A 142 km double-tracked electrified spur off of the Ankara-Sivas line, planned from Yerköy to Kayseri, construction began in July 2022, and is planned for completion by 2026, reducing travel times from Ankara to under 2 hours with a design speed of 250 km/h.

=== Osmaneli-Bursa-Bandırma ===
The 201 km spur off the Istanbul-Ankara line from Osmaneli to Bandırma through Bursa is under construction and is slated for completion by 2026; the full line will be built for 200 km/h operation and cost 9.5 billion lira, bringing travel times between Ankara and Bursa to 2 hours and 10 minutes. The line is 80% complete as of December 2023.

=== Istanbul-Edirne-Kapıkule ===
A 229 km line on the European side of the Bosporus will connect Halkalı station in Istanbul with Kapıkule railway station in Edirne. Construction started in 2019 with an anticipated opening of the first stage between Kapıkule and Çerkezköy in 9th of October 2026, and the project will reduce travel times from 4 hours to 1 hour 30 minutes. The phase between Çerkezköy and Halkalı will be opened in two different sections and times. The section between Halkalı and Ispartakule is expected to be operational at the first quarter of 2027 and Ispartakule-Çerkezköy section is planned to be opened at 2028. The double-tracked electrified railway will be built for 200 km/h operational speed and cost 10.5 billion lira, of which more than half is provided by a European Union grant. There are plans to connect the line to Tekirdağ and Kırklareli with branch lines which begin from Büyükkarıştıran and Babaeski in the near future.

=== Karaman-Ulukışla-Yenice ===
A further 135 km extension Ankara-Konya-Karaman line is currently in construction to Ulukışla, which is 89% complete as of winter 2022. Extensions from Ulukışla to Yenice and Aksaray are in the process of being tendered as of 2021, the 200 km/h line is planned to eventually connect to Mersin - Adana - Gaziantep high speed line. The Mersin-Adana-Osmaniye-Gaziantep high speed line is expected to open in 2024.

=== Ankara–İzmir ===
The project has started and is tentatively planned to open in 2027.

The line will pass through Afyon to meet the high-speed line from Ankara to Istanbul near Polatlı. It will have a length of 624 km, with a projected running speed of 250 km/h The travel will take 3 hours and 30 minutes.

The construction of line is planned in three phases:

Ankara–İzmir high-speed line construction
Line section	Length (km)	Start / opening date	Notes
Ankara–Polatlı junction	98	2004–2009/prior work	Constructed as part of the Ankara to Istanbul high-speed line, on the Sincan – Eskişehir section.
Polatlı–Konya the 120 km mark	27	2007–2011/prior work	Constructed as part of the Ankara to Konya high-speed line, on the Phase 1 section.
Phase 1 Polatlı–Afyon	167	2016–2018	The line uses first 120 km. of Ankara – Konya high-speed line. The junction is located approximately 20 km south of Polatlı. Number of tunnels: 11 --- Total tunnel length: 8,000 meters Number of viaducts: 16 --- Total viaduct length: 6,300 meters Number of bridges: 24
Phase 2 Afyon–Uşak		2018–2019	Tendered in 2017.
Phase 3 Uşak–Manisa–İzmir		2019–2027	Under construction.

=== Ankara–Samsun ===
The project commenced in 2026 with its first step connecting Ankara to Çorum.

=== Ankara–Istanbul super-fast line ===
Ankara - Istanbul SHD, is a double-track, electric, signaled high-speed railway project suitable for a maximum speed of 350 kilometers/hour (220 mph), which is planned to provide services in 2030s.

== Related infrastructure projects ==
The Marmaray project, which consists of a rail transport network around Istanbul and the world's deepest immersed tube railway tunnel under the Bosphorus strait, is also under construction. The Marmaray tunnel will connect the railway lines on the European and Asian parts of Istanbul and Turkey. In 2013 the Marmaray tunnel was opened and passenger transportation is started partially in 13.5 km of total 76.5 km. The rest was expected to be completed by 2015, but it now looks like this will not happen until some time in 2016. The project connecting the European and Asian suburban railway lines, will also connect the Thracian and Anatolian high-speed railway lines in Turkey via the world's deepest immersed-tube railway tunnel under the Bosporus.

A new high-speed rail terminus station is to be built in Ankara (2009–2010), which is to be funded as a public–private partnership, using the Build-Operate-Transfer model. Additionally, new stations are to be constructed in İstanbul, Izmir, Edirne, Trabzon, Erzurum, Erzincan, Sivas, Kayseri, Antalya, Afyon, and Polatlı. Furthermore, an additional project called Başkentray is also underway which consist of the renewal of railways in the urban section of Ankara.

== Service and operation ==
=== Speed limitations ===
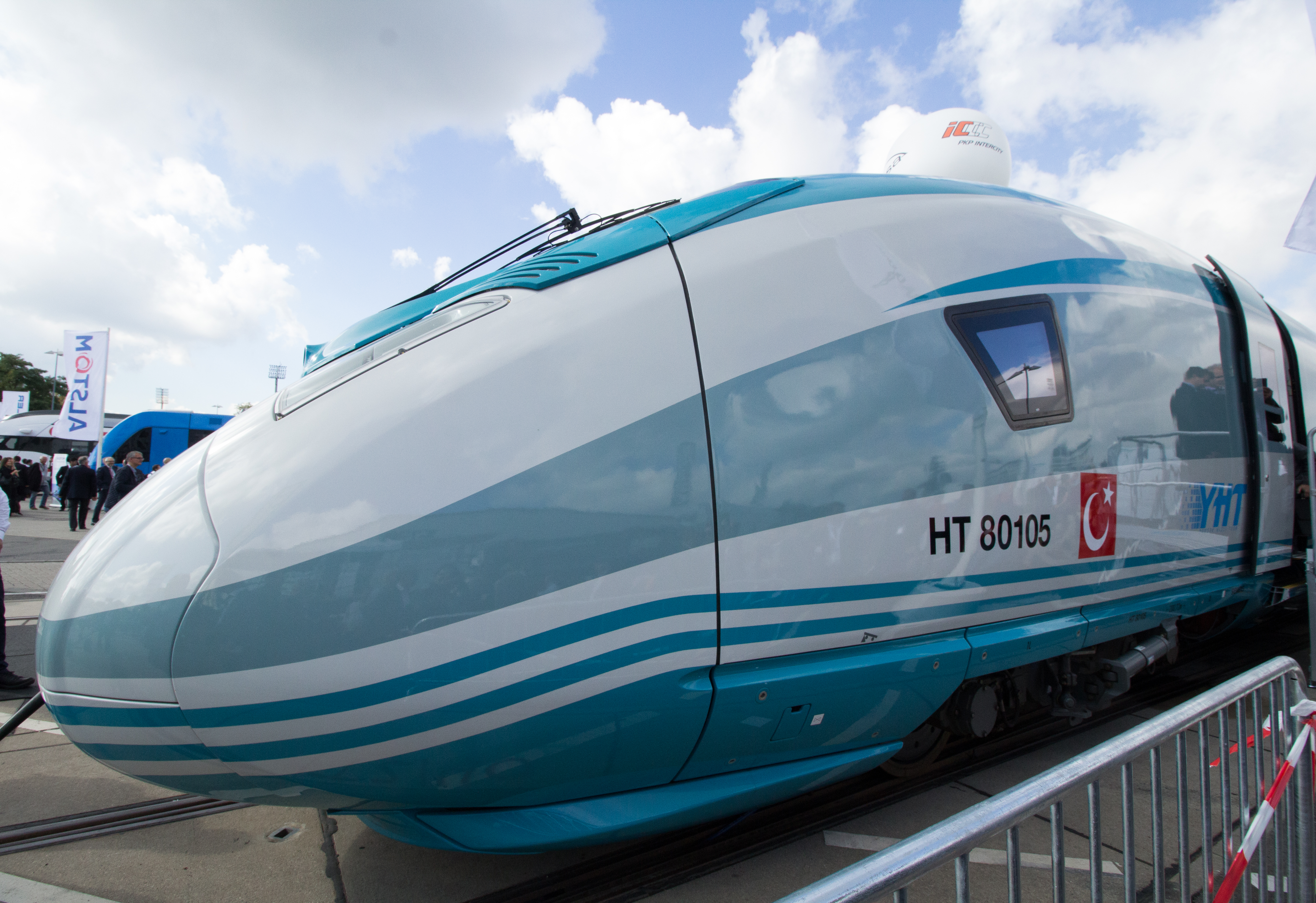
TCDD HT80000 (Siemens Velaro TR) has a maximum operating speed of 300 km/h (186 mph)

The YHT operates at a maximum speed of 300 km/h (186 mph) on high-speed tracks. But the YHT also runs on non-high-speed and renewed tracks like the Köseköy-Gebze section of the Ankara–Istanbul high-speed railway where its top speed is 160 km/h (99 mph). Naturally, some speed restrictions also apply in urban sections while accessing the central station, especially in Ankara and Istanbul thus increasing journey times. The speed on these sections is expected to increase once renewal projects in urban areas (like Başkentray and second phase of Marmaray) are completed.

=== Staff, operation and security ===
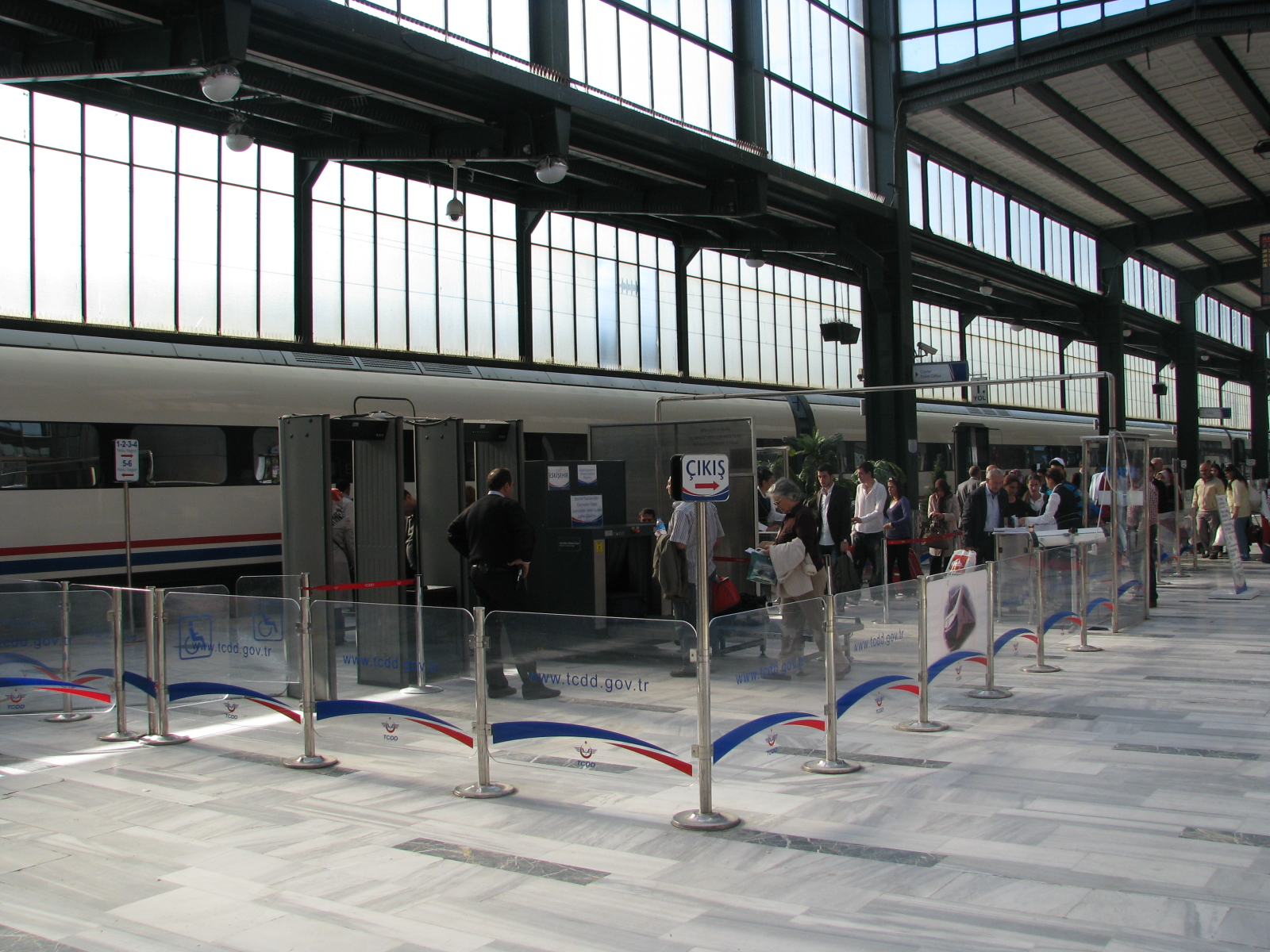
A security checkpoint for YHT passengers at the Ankara station

On YHT service, there is usually one train engineer (two on some trains), a train manager (absent in some trips), two train attendants and a café car attendant. Business-class passengers are served meals at their seats if they applied for while buying their tickets. When accessing the trains, passengers must pass a security check like in airports. Maintenance of the sets is done at the Eryaman Yard in Ankara.

== High-speed train sets and production facilities ==
=== TREVI ETR 500 ===
The first high-speed trains to run on Turkish rails were two ETR 500 train sets rented from Trenitalia of Italy and were used for testing the completed part of the high-speed railway network, between Eskişehir and Ankara, on 23 April 2007. During the tests, ETR 500 Y2 achieved the current rail speed record in Turkey, reaching 303 km/h.

=== TCDD HT65000 ===
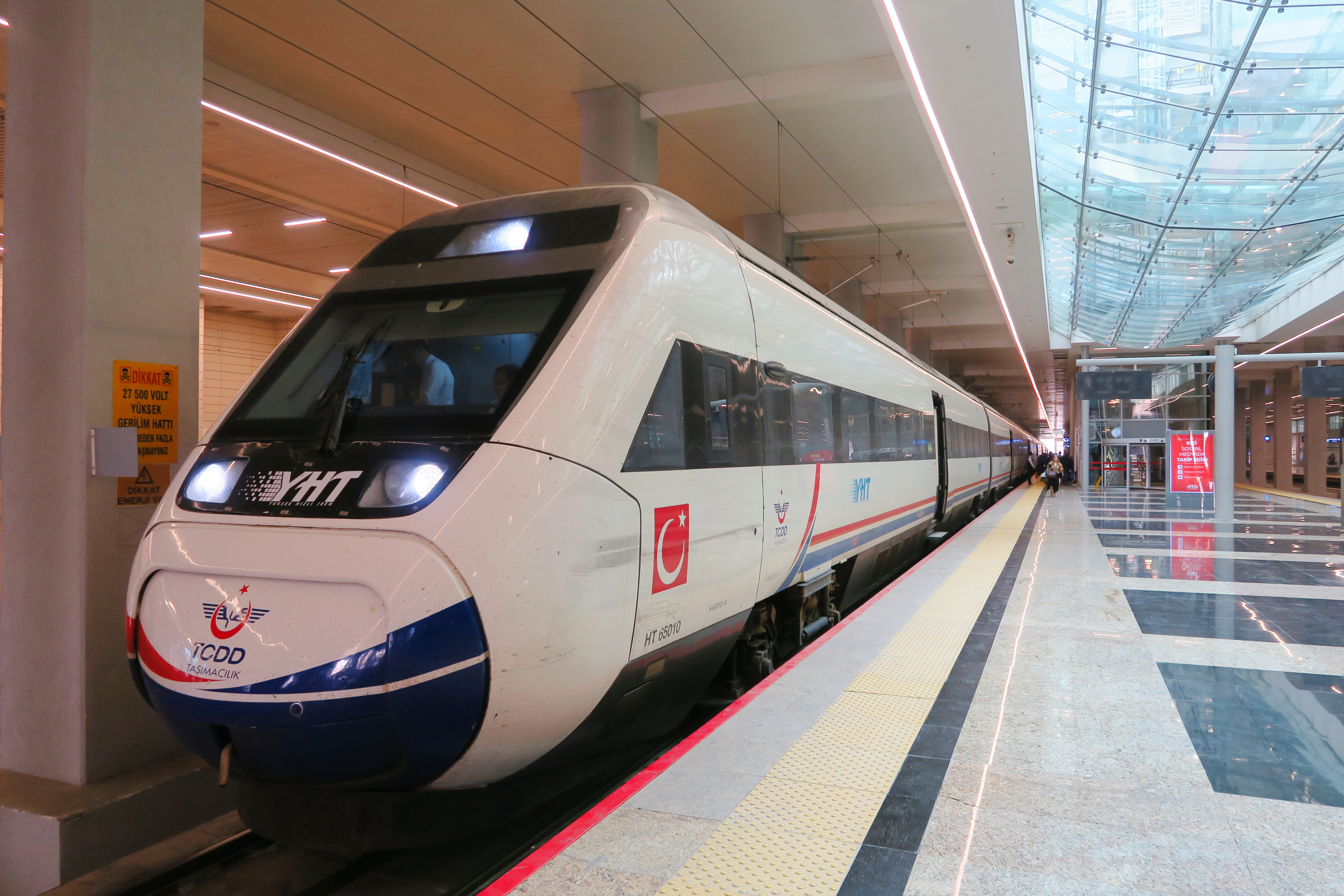
TCDD HT65000

TCDD HT65000 is a series of twelve high-speed electric multiple units built by the Construcciones y Auxiliar de Ferrocarriles (CAF) of Spain for the Turkish State Railways (TCDD), The EMUs are used on the Turkish high-speed railway network and can reach a maximum commercial speed of 250 km/h.

=== TCDD HT80000 ===
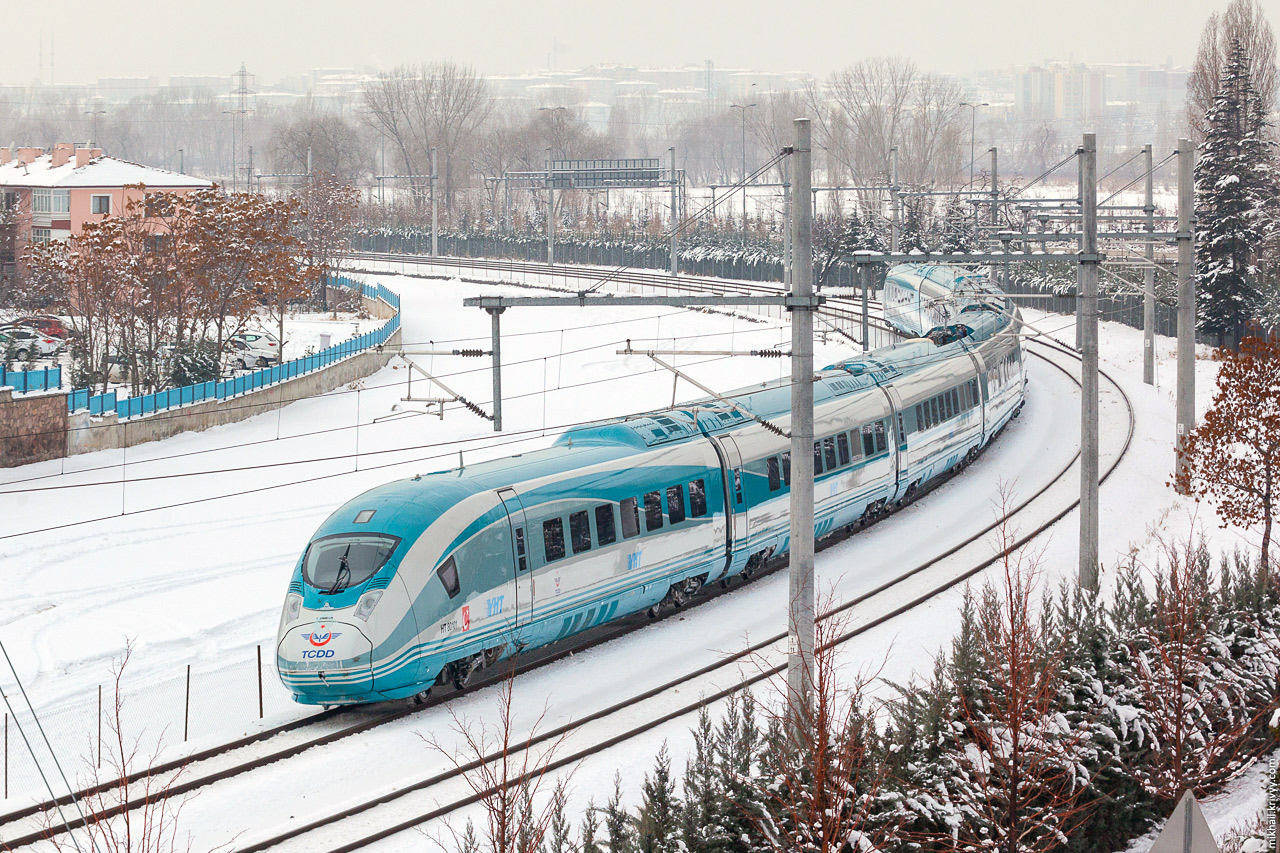
TCDD HT80000

The Velaro TR (TCDD HT80000) is a Velaro D derived 8-car standard gauge high-speed train for the Turkish State Railways (TCDD). The eight cars, totalling a length of 200 m, can accommodate 519 passengers and reach a top speed of 300 km/h. 25 kV 50 Hz AC power the train with a total of 8 MW.

Turkish State Railways (TCDD) placed an order for seven Velaro high-speed trainsets in July 2013. The contract is worth €285M, including seven years of maintenance. The Velaros are to be deployed on the Turkish high-speed railway network. The first Siemens Velaro TR entered service in 2014.

On 18 February 2015, TCDD ordered another 10 Velaro TR for delivery in 2017. The €400M contract include the first three years of maintenance and spareparts.

Unlike the traditional white – red – dark blue color scheme used on the TCDD HT65000 high-speed trains, a white – turquoise – grey color scheme has been selected for the livery of TCDD's Velaro TR trains.

=== EUROTEM and TÜRASAŞ ===
EUROTEM, alternatively Hyundai EURotem, is a joint enterprise between Hyundai Rotem of South Korea and TÜVASAŞ of Turkey which was established in 2006 and started production in December 2007. The Hyundai EURotem factory in Adapazarı, Turkey, was built as the Hızlı Tren Fabrikası (High-Speed Train Factory) with the purpose of manufacturing the next generation of Turkey's high-speed train sets.

TÜRASAŞ (Turkish: Türkiye Raylı Sistem Araçları Sanayii Anonim Şirketi) is a railway manufacturer based in Ankara resulted in the merging of TÜLOMSAŞ, TÜVASAŞ and TÜDEMSAŞ, announced in the Official Gazette of the Republic of Turkey on 4 March 2020. Until 2030, the company aims to produce the first domestically made high-speed trainset, TCDD HT70000, under the National High-Speed Train project.

== See also ==
- AVE
- High-speed rail in Europe
- High-speed rail
- History of rail transport in Turkey
- Intercity Express
- Le Frecce
- List of high-speed railway lines
- Rail transport in Turkey
- TGV
- Turkish State Railways
