= Geography of Turkey =

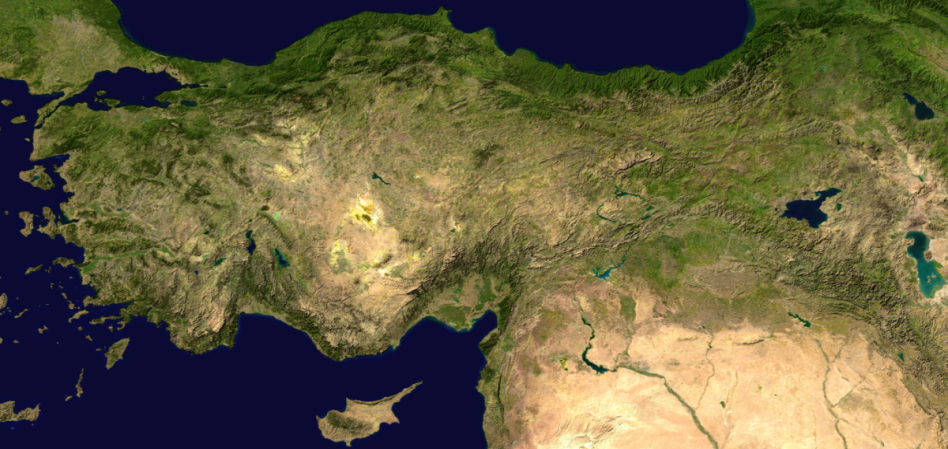
- Continent: Asia and Europe
- Region: West Asia and Southern Europe
- Coordinates: 39°00′N 35°00′E
- Area: Ranked 36th
  - Total: 783,562 km^{2} (302,535 sq mi)
  - Land: 98%
  - Water: 2%
- Coastline: 7,200 km (4,500 mi)
- Borders: Total land borders: 2648 km Armenia 268 km, Azerbaijan 9 km, Bulgaria 240 km, Georgia 252 km, Greece 206 km, Iran 499 km, Iraq 352 km, Syria 822 km
- Highest point: Mount Ağrı (Ararat); 5,137 m
- Lowest point: Mediterranean Sea; 0 m
- Longest river: Kızılırmak; 1,350 km
- Largest lake: Van; 3,755 km^{2} (1,449.81 sq mi)
- Exclusive economic zone: 261,654 km2 (Exclusive economic zone)

The Anatolian side of Turkey is the largest portion in the country that bridges southeastern Europe and west Asia. East Thrace, the European portion of Turkey comprises 3% of the landmass but over 15% of the population. East Thrace is separated from Asia Minor, the Asian portion of Turkey, by the Bosporus, the Sea of Marmara and the Dardanelles. İskilip, Çorum province, is considered to be the geographical center of Earth. Turkey is very vulnerable to earthquakes.

== External boundaries ==
Turkey’s frontiers with Greece—206 kilometers—and Bulgaria—240 kilometers— were settled by the Treaty of Constantinople (1913) and later confirmed by the Treaty of Lausanne in 1923. The 1921 treaties of Moscow and Kars with the Soviet Union defines Turkey’s current borders with Armenia (268 kilometers), Azerbaijan (9 kilometers), and Georgia (252 kilometers). The 499-kilometer Iranian border was first settled by the 1639 Treaty of Kasr-ı Şirin and confirmed in 1937. With the exception of Mosul, Turkey ceded the territories of the present-day Iraq and Syria with the Treaty of Lausanne in 1923. In 1926, Turkey ceded Mosul to the United Kingdom in exchange for 10% of the oil revenues from Mosul for 25 years. Syria’s border with Turkey changed with the 1939 transfer of Hatay Province, following a referendum that favored union with Turkey.

== Regions ==
The First Geography Congress, held in Ankara between 6–21 June 1941, divided Turkey into seven regions after long discussions and work. These geographical regions were separated according to their climate, location, flora and fauna, human habitat, agricultural diversities, transportation, topography, etc. At the end, 4 coastal regions and 3 inner regions were named according to their proximity to the four seas surrounding Turkey, and their positions in Anatolia.

Turkey has a diverse terrain: the plains of Anatolia, and forests of the Black Sea, semi-arid lands, natural lakes and the coastlines of the Aegean and Mediterranean. The Anatolian plain is separated from the Black Sea by the Pontic Mountains, converging with the Taurus Mountains in the Northeast of the country where Mount Ararat is located. The full territory of Turkey is 783,356 square kilometers (756,688 of those in Anatolia, and 23,764 in European Thrace).

According to area-weighted geometric centroid calculations on the WGS84 reference ellipsoid using GADM and Natural Earth land boundary datasets, the geographical center of Turkey itself is located in the Eşrefpaşa locality of Çandır District, Yozgat Province (39°14′43.7″N 35°29′14.5″E).

=== Black Sea region ===
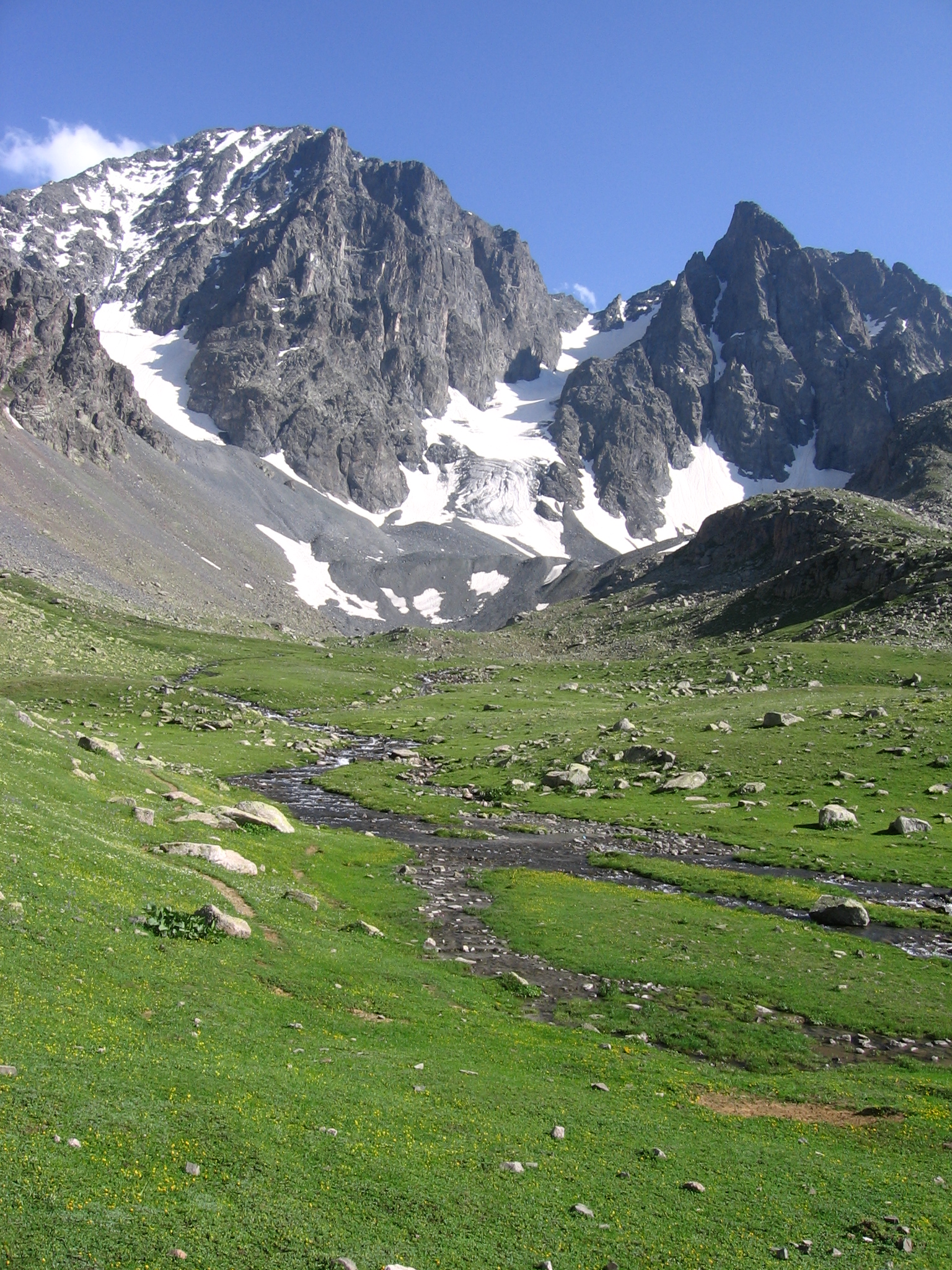
Kaçkar Mountains.

The physical geography of the Black Sea region landscapes is characterized by the mountain range forming a barrier parallel with the Black Sea Coast and high humidity and precipitation. The eastern Black Sea region presents alpine landscapes with steep and densely forested slopes. Steep slopes, as a morphological feature, occur both under the sea, and in the mountain ranges, with the sea floor at below 2000 m along a line from Trabzon to the Turkish–Georgian border, and the mountains quickly reaching over 3000 m, with a maximum of 3971 m in Kaçkar Peak. The parallel valleys running north to the Black Sea used to be isolated from one another until a few decades ago because the densely forested ridges made transportation and exchange very difficult. This allowed for the development of a strong cultural identity— the Laz language, music and dance—linked to this specific geographic context.

From west to east, the main rivers of the region are the Sakarya (824 km), the Kızılırmak River (1355 km, the longest river of Turkey), the Yeşilırmak (418 km) and the Çoruh (376 km).

Year-round high precipitation—up to 2200mm—generate dense forests, with oak, beech family trees, hazel (Corylus avellana), hornbeam (Carpinus betulus) and sweet chesnut (Castanea sativa) prevailing.

Isolated from one another because of steep valleys, the Black Sea region includes 850 plant taxa of which 116 is endemic to the area, and of which 12 are endangered and 19 vulnerable. Hazelnut is a native species for this region, which covers 70 and 82% of the world's production and exports respectively.

The Kaçkar Range at altitudes of 3000 m and above is heavily glaciated owing to the suitable geomorphological- climatological conditions during the Pleistocene.

=== Marmara region ===
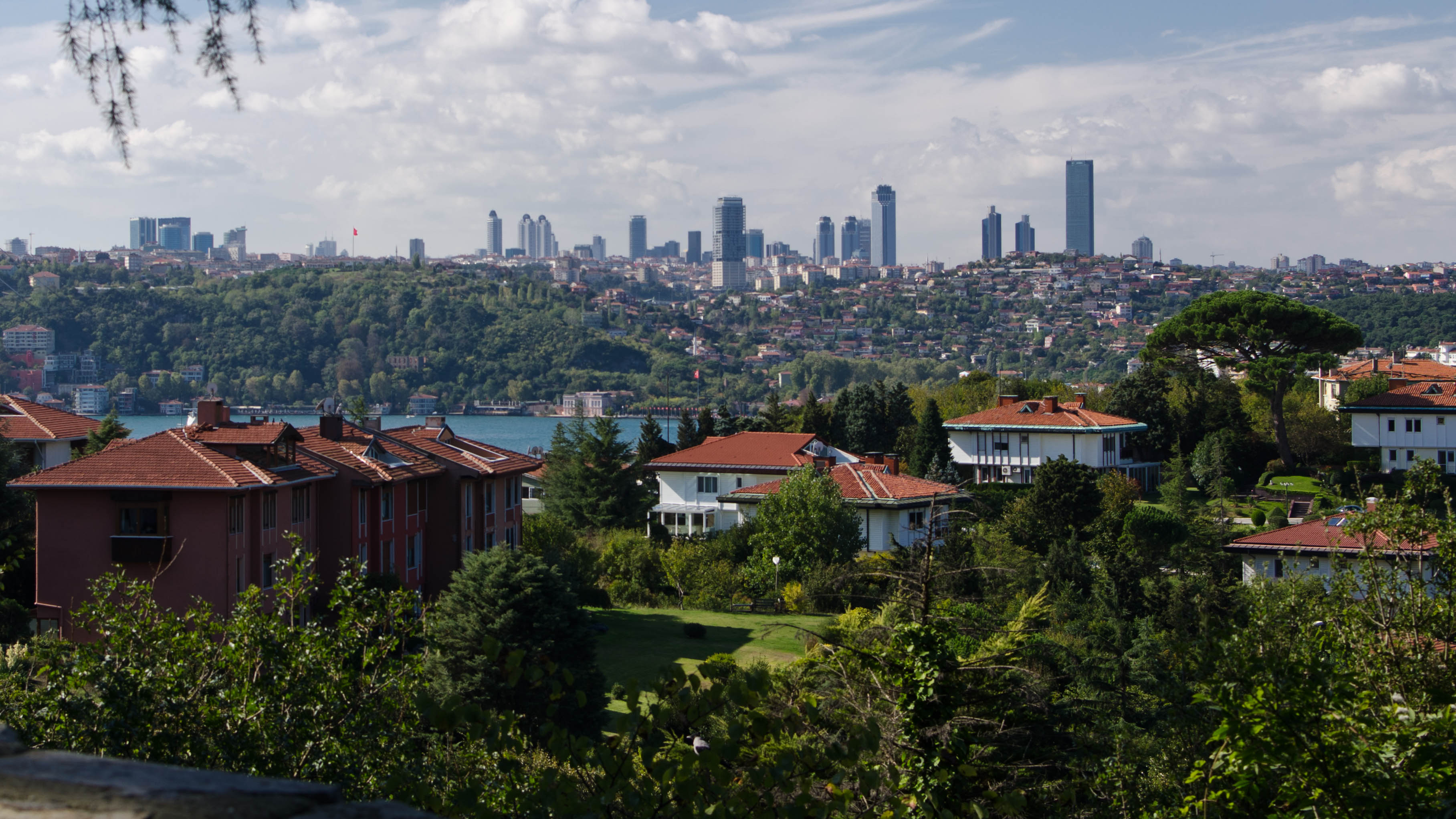
A view of Levent from Kanlıca across the Bosporus.

The European portion of Turkey consists mainly of rolling plateau country well suited to agriculture.

Densely populated, this area includes the cities of Istanbul and Edirne. The Bosphorus, which links the Sea of Marmara and the Black Sea, is about twenty-five kilometers long and averages 1.5 kilometers in width but narrows in places to less than 1,000 meters. There are three suspension bridges over the Bosphorus, both its Asian and European banks rise steeply from the water and form a succession of cliffs, coves, and nearly landlocked bays. Most of the shores are densely wooded and are marked by numerous small towns and villages. The Dardanelles (ancient Hellespont) strait, which links the Sea of Marmara (ancient Propontis) and the Aegean Sea, is approximately forty kilometers long and increases in width toward the south. Unlike the Bosphorus, the Dardanelles has fewer settlements along its shores. The Saros Bay is located near the Gallipoli peninsula and is disliked because of dirty beaches. It is a favourite spot among scuba divers for the richness of its underwater fauna and is becoming increasingly popular due to its vicinity to Istanbul.

The most important valleys are the Kocaeli Valley, the Bursa Ovası (Bursa Basin), and the Plains of Troy (historically known as the Troad). The valley lowlands around Bursa is densely populated.

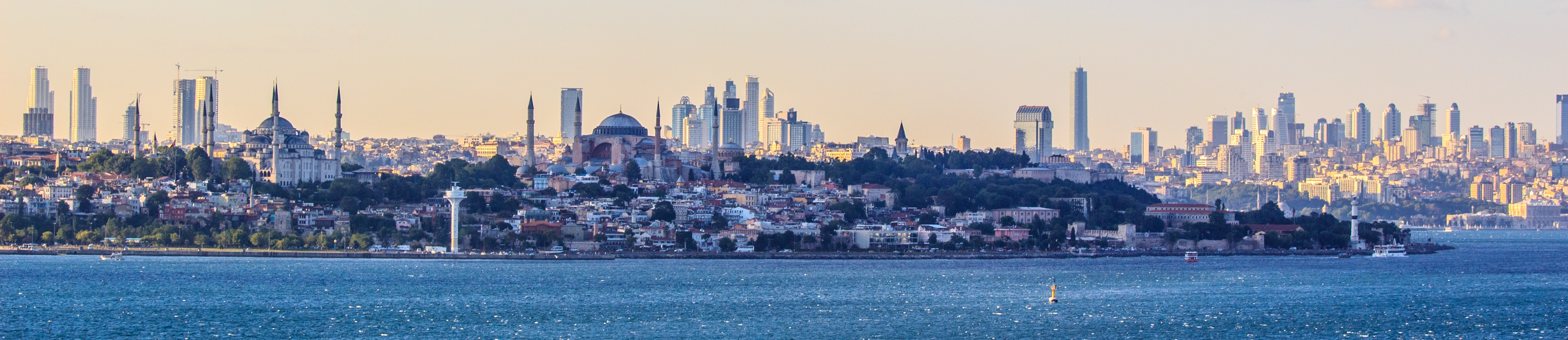
Panoramic view of the Bosphorus strait, where Asia and Europe meet, with the Hagia Sophia and Blue Mosque view.

=== Aegean region ===
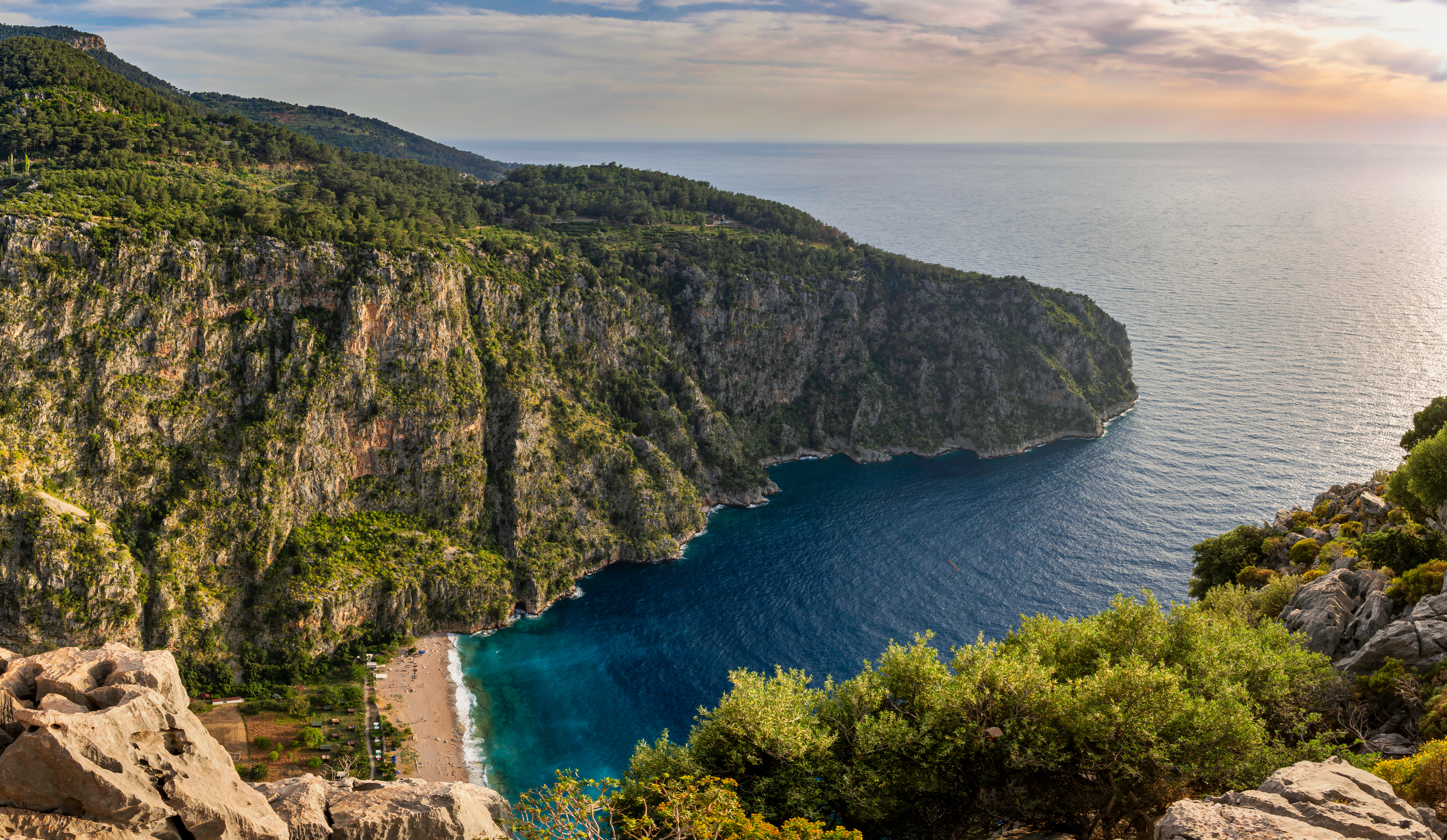
Butterfly Valley on the Turkish Riviera.

Located on the western side of Anatolia, the Aegean region has fertile soil and a typically Mediterranean climate; with mild, wet winters and hot, dry summers. The broad, cultivated valley lowlands contain about half of the country's richest farmlands.

The largest city in the Aegean region of Turkey is İzmir, which is also the country's third-largest city and a major manufacturing center; as well as its second-largest port after Istanbul.

Olive and olive oil production is particularly important for the economy of the region. The seaside town of Ayvalık and numerous towns in the provinces of Balıkesir, İzmir and Aydın are particularly famous for their olive oil and related products; such as soap and cosmetics.

The region also has many important centers of tourism which are known both for their historic monuments and for the beauty of their beaches; such as Assos, Ayvalık, Bergama, Foça, İzmir, Çeşme, Sardis, Ephesus, Kuşadası, Didim, Miletus, Bodrum, Marmaris, Datça and Fethiye.

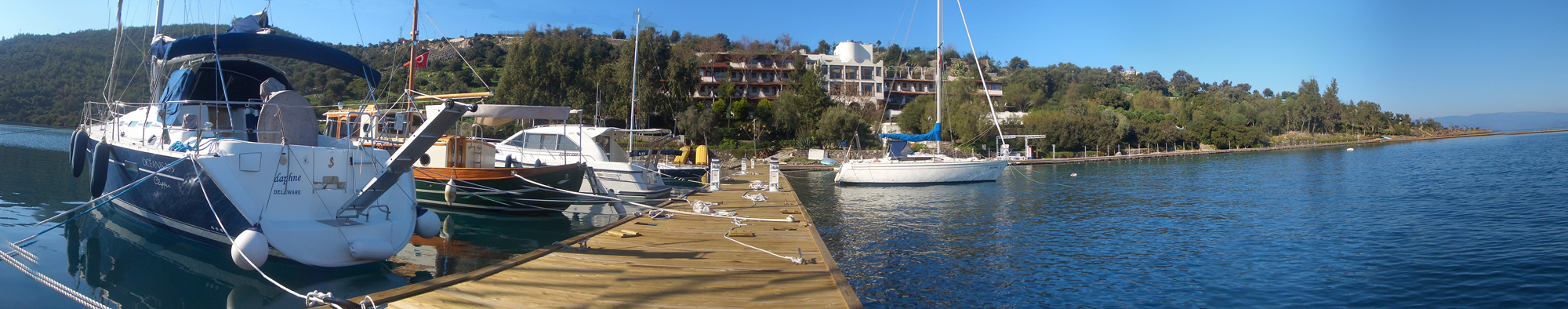
Panoramic view of Paradise Bay in Bodrum, ancient Halicarnassus, the city of Herodotus and the home of the Mausoleum of Maussollos, one of the Seven Wonders of the Ancient World

=== Mediterranean region ===
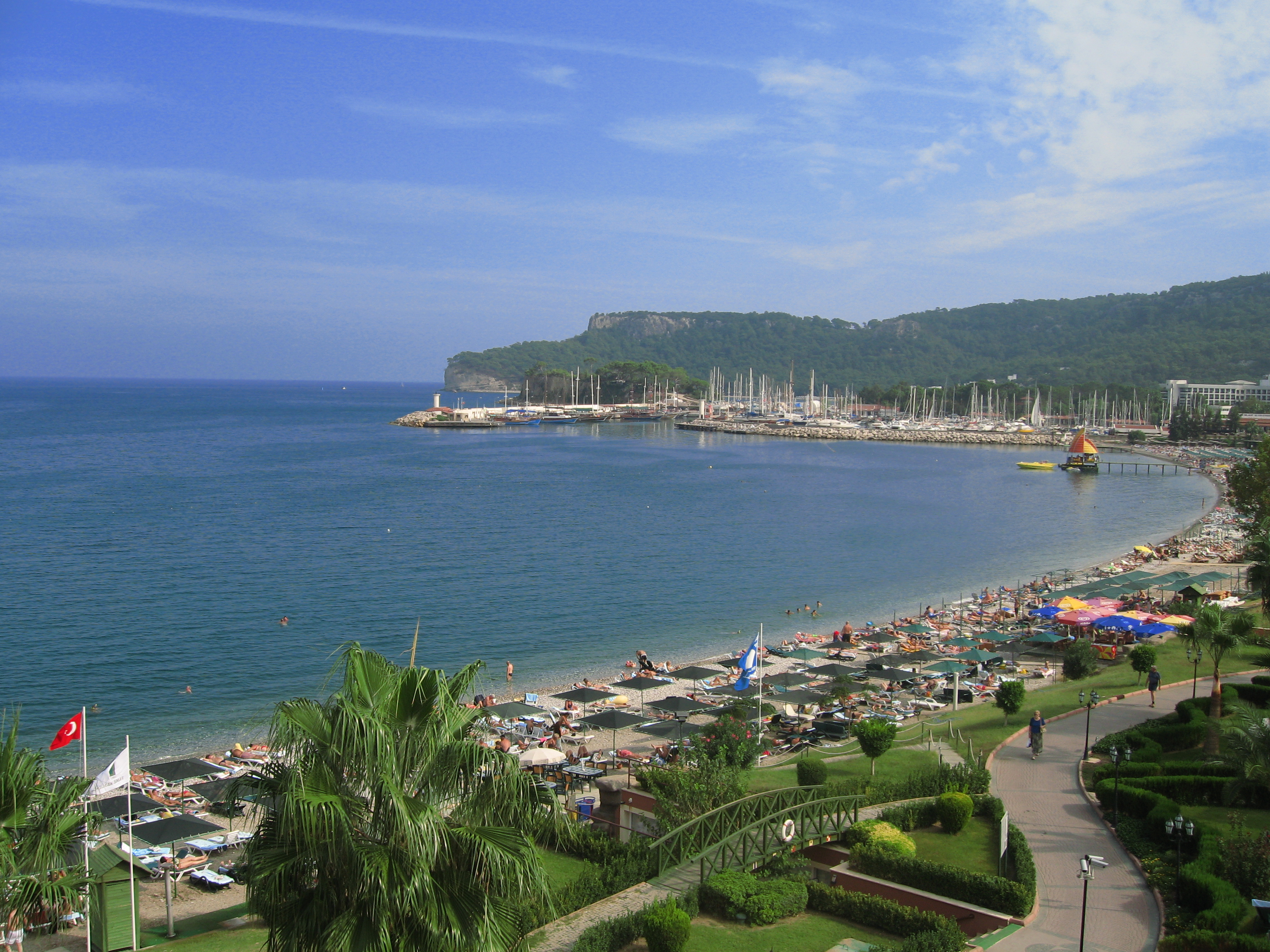
Beaches and marina of Kemer near Antalya on the Turkish Riviera.

Toward the east, the extensive Cilician Plain, around Adana, Turkey's fifth most populous city, consist largely of reclaimed flood lands. In general, rivers have not cut valleys to the sea in the western part of the region. Historically, movement inland from the western Mediterranean coast was difficult. East of Adana, much of the coastal plain has limestone features such as collapsed caverns and sinkholes. Between Adana and Antalya, the Taurus Mountains rise sharply from the coast to high elevations. Other than Adana, Antalya, and Mersin, the Mediterranean coast has few major cities, although it has numerous farming villages.

Paralleling the Mediterranean coast, the Taurus Mountains (Turkish: Toros Dağları) are Turkey's second chain of folded mountains. The range rises just inland from the coast and trends generally in an easterly direction until it reaches the Arabian Platform, where it arcs around the northern side of the platform. The Taurus Mountains are more rugged and less dissected by rivers than the Pontic Mountains and historically have served as a barrier to human movement inland from the Mediterranean coast except where there are mountain passes such as the historic Cilician Gates (Gülek Pass), northwest of Adana.

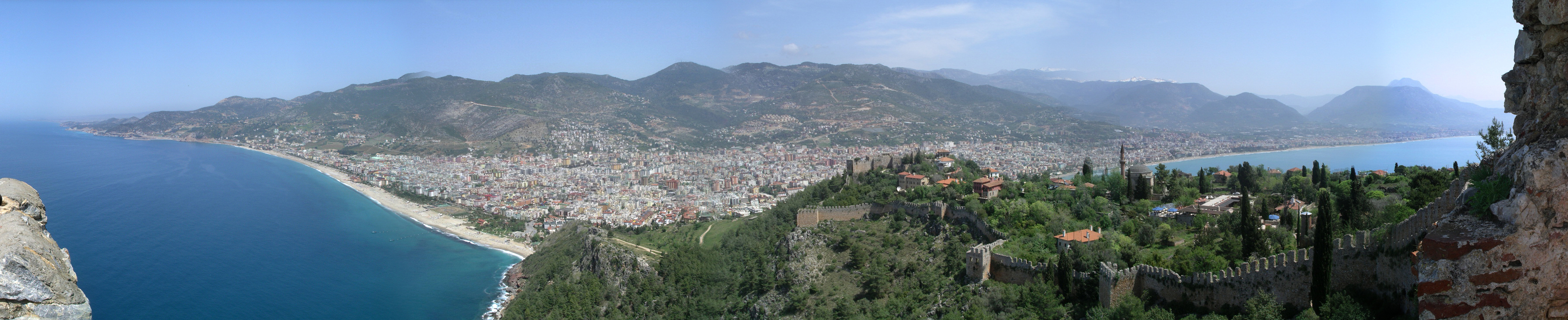
Panoramic view of Alanya, inhabited since the Hittites and the medieval homeport of the Seljuk naval forces, famous today for its natural beauty and historic monuments

=== Central Anatolia region ===
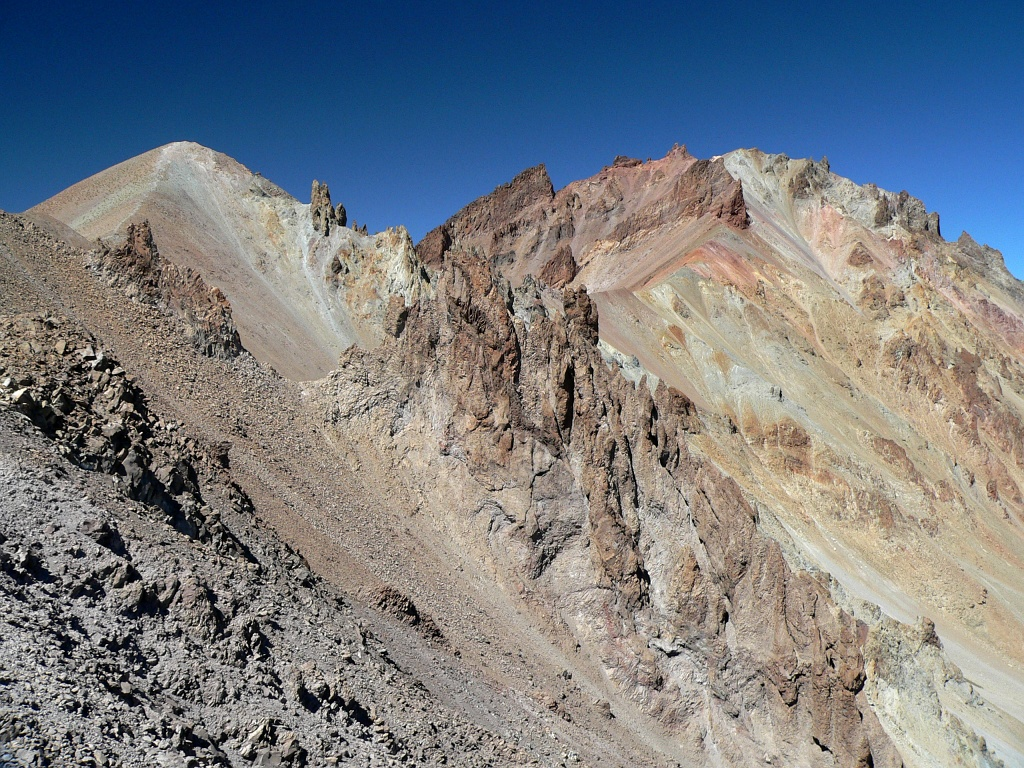
Mount Erciyes near Kayseri

Stretching inland from the Aegean coastal plain, the Central Anatolia region occupies the area between the two zones of the folded mountains, extending east to the point where the two ranges converge. The plateau-like, semi-arid highlands of Anatolia are considered the heartland of the country. The region varies in elevation from 700 to 2000 meters from west to east. Mount Erciyes is the peak at 3916 meters. The two largest basins on the plateau are the Konya Ovası and the basin occupied by the large salt lake, Tuz Gölü. Both basins are characterized by inland drainage. Wooded areas are confined to the northwest and northeast of the plateau. Rain-fed cultivation is widespread, with wheat being the principal crop. Irrigated agriculture is restricted to the areas surrounding rivers and wherever sufficient underground water is available. Important irrigated crops include barley, corn, cotton, various fruits, grapes, opium poppies, sugar beets, roses, and tobacco. There also is extensive grazing throughout the plateau.

Central Anatolia receives little annual rainfall. For instance, the semi-arid center of the plateau receives an average yearly precipitation of only 300 millimeters. However, actual rainfall from year to year is irregular and occasionally may be less than 200 millimeters, leading to severe reductions in crop yields for both rain-fed and irrigated agriculture. In years of low rainfall, stock losses also can be high. Overgrazing has contributed to soil erosion on the plateau. During the summers, frequent dust storms blow a fine yellow powder across the plateau. Locusts occasionally ravage the eastern area in April and May. In general, the plateau experiences moderate heat, with almost no rainfall in summer and cold weather with heavy snow in winter.

Frequently interspersed throughout the folded mountains, and also situated on the Anatolian Plateau, are well-defined basins, which the Turks call ova. Some are no more than a widening of a stream valley; others, such as the Konya Ovası, are large basins of inland drainage or are the result of limestone erosion. Most of the basins take their names from cities or towns located at their rims. Where a lake has formed within the basin, the water body is usually saline as a result of the internal drainage—the water has no outlet to the sea.

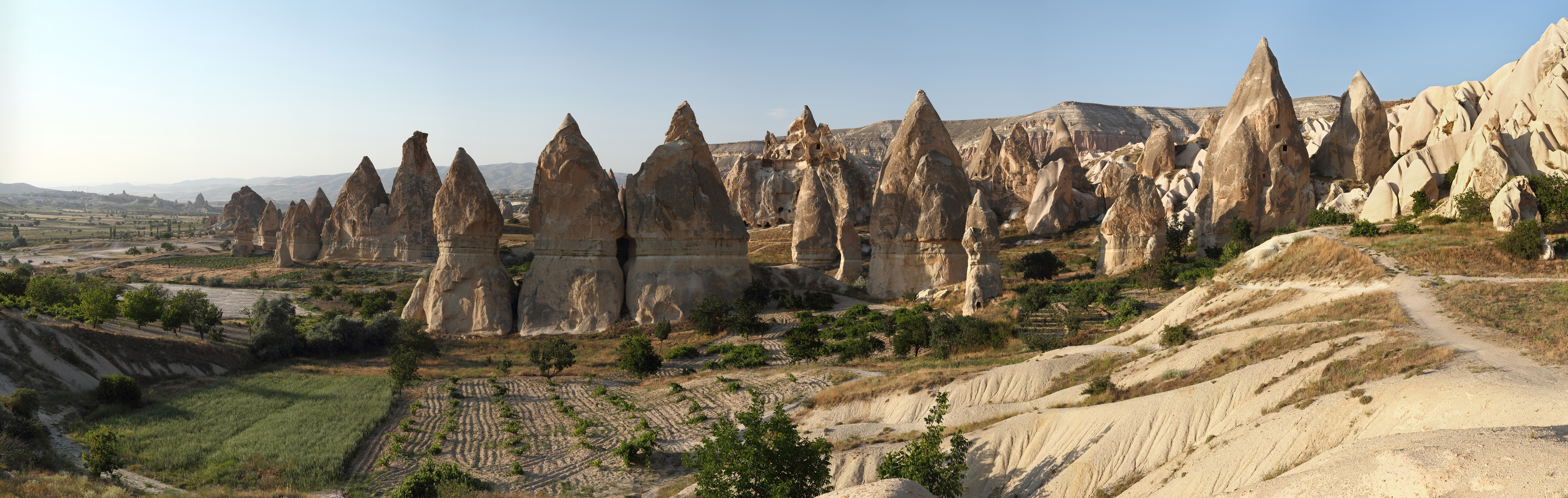
Panoramic view of the Fairy Chimneys in Cappadocia

=== Eastern Anatolia region ===
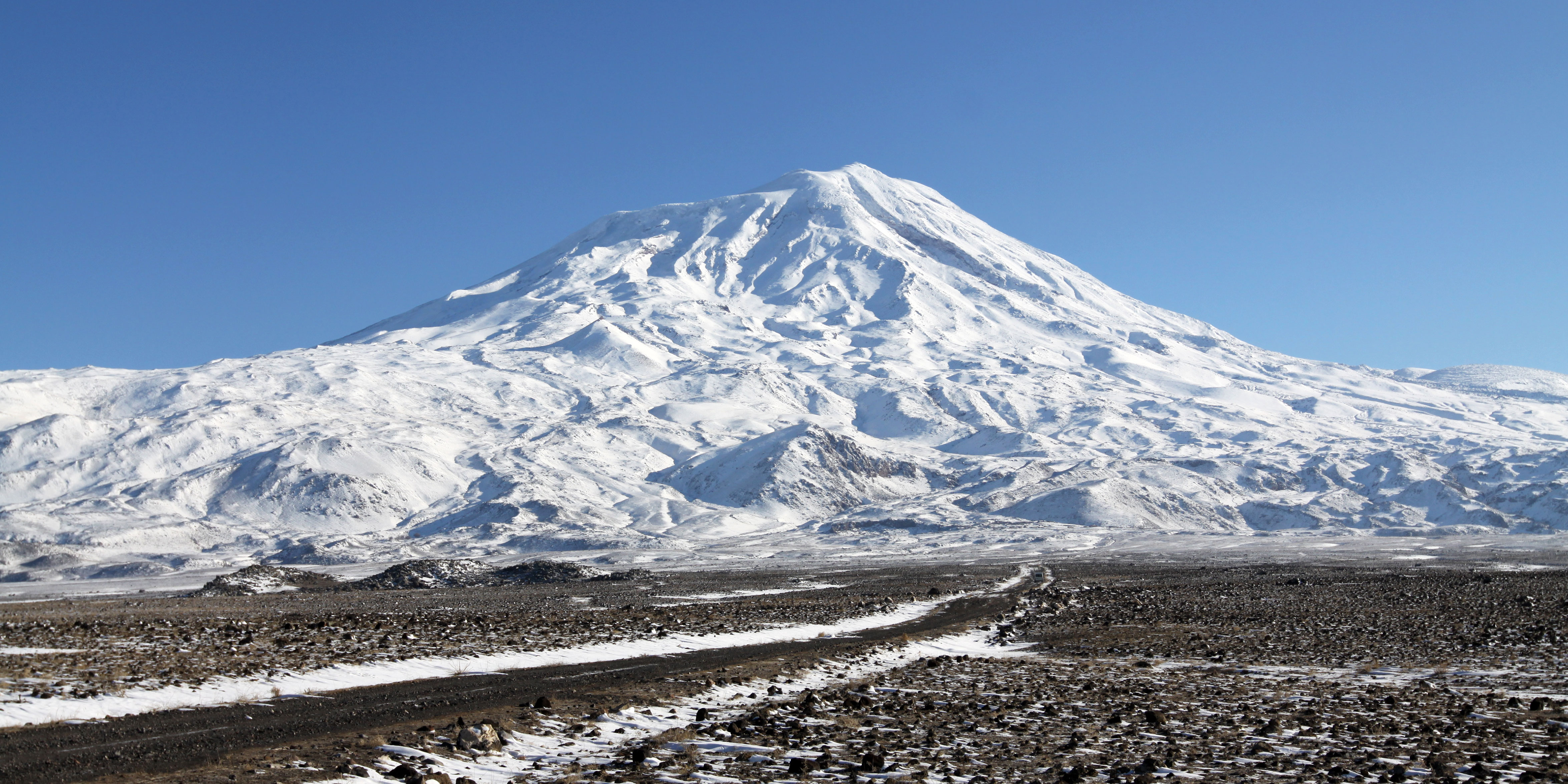
Mount Ararat

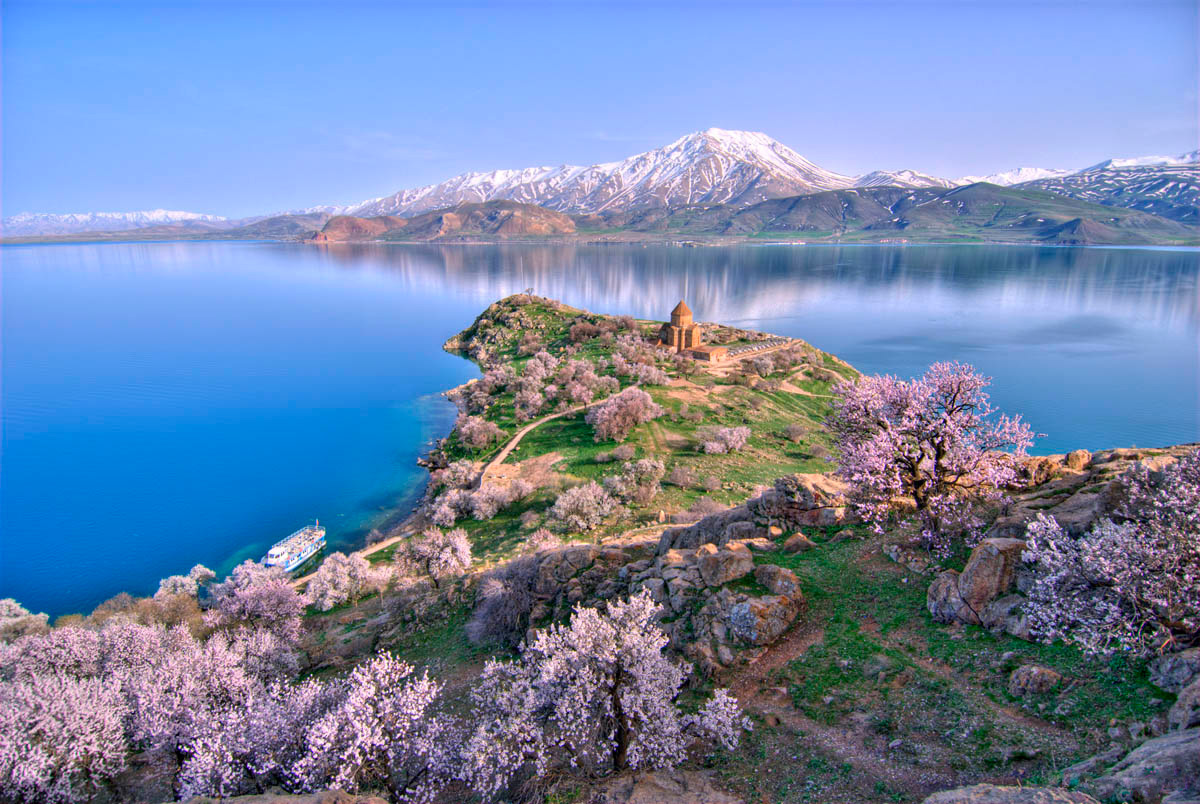
Lake Van

Eastern Anatolia, where the Pontic and Anti-Taurus mountain ranges converge, is rugged country with higher elevations, a more severe climate, and greater precipitation than are found on the Anatolian Plateau. The western part of the Eastern Anatolia region is known as the Anti-Taurus, where the average elevation of mountain peaks exceed 3,000 meters; while the eastern part of the region was historically known as the Armenian Highland and includes Mount Ararat, the highest point in Turkey at 5,137 meters. Many of the East Anatolian peaks apparently are recently extinct volcanoes, to judge from extensive green lava flows. Turkey's largest lake, Lake Van, is situated in the mountains at an elevation of 1,546 meters. The headwaters of three major rivers arise in the Anti-Taurus: the east-flowing Aras, which pours into the Caspian Sea; the south-flowing Euphrates; and the south-flowing Tigris, which eventually joins the Euphrates in Iraq before emptying into the Persian Gulf. Several small streams that empty into the Black Sea or landlocked Lake Van also originate in these mountains.

In addition to its rugged mountains, the area is known for severe winters with heavy snowfalls. The few valleys and plains in these mountains tend to be fertile and to support diverse agriculture. The main basin is the Muş Valley, west of Lake Van. Narrow valleys also lie at the foot of the lofty peaks along river corridors.

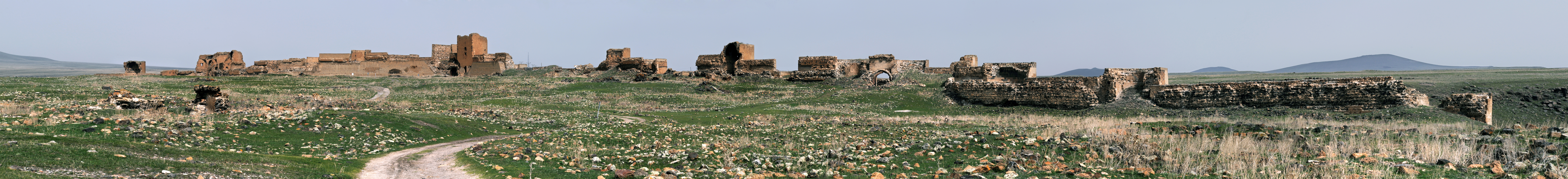
Panoramic view of Ani in Kars

=== Southeastern Anatolia region ===
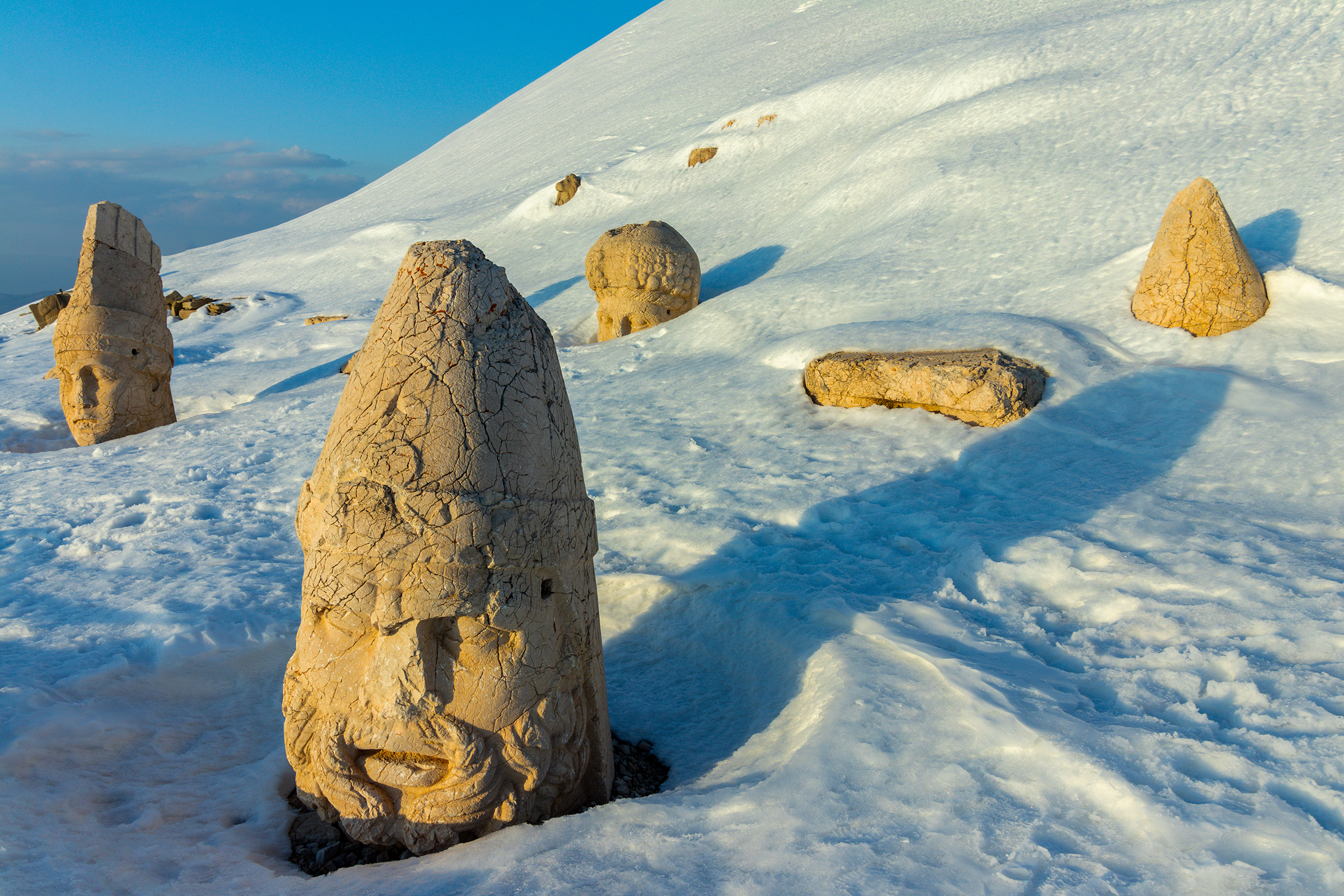
Mount Nemrut, Adıyaman

Southeast Anatolia is south of the Anti-Taurus Mountains. It is a region of rolling hills and a broad plateau surface that extends into Syria. Elevations decrease gradually, from about 800 meters in the north to about 500 meters in the south. Traditionally, wheat and barley were the main crops of the region, but the inauguration of major new irrigation projects in the 1980s has led to greater agricultural diversity and development.

== Geology ==
Map of earthquakes in Turkey from 1900 to 2023.

The geology of Turkey is the product of a wide variety of tectonic processes that have shaped Anatolia over millions of years, a process which continues today as evidenced by frequent earthquakes and occasional volcanic eruptions.

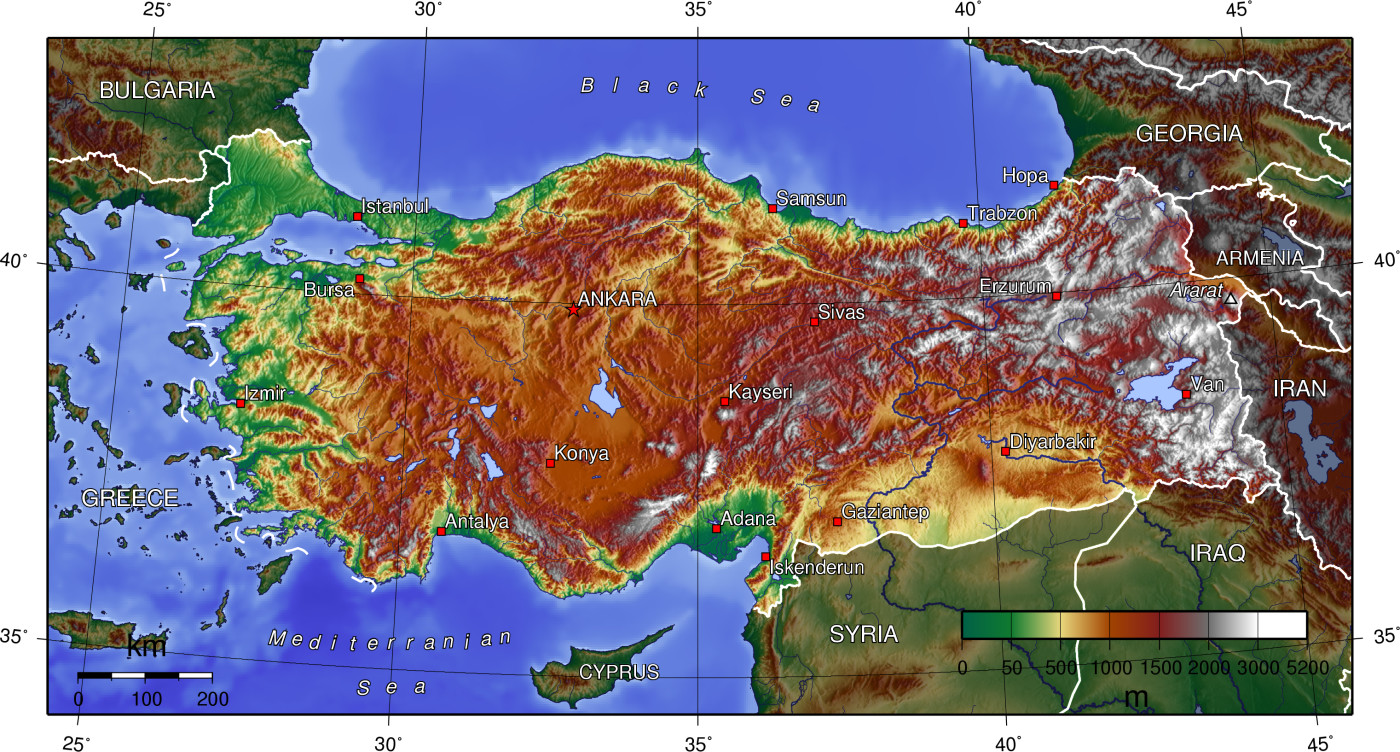
Topographic map of Turkey.

Except for a relatively small portion of its territory along the Syrian border that is a continuation of the Arabian Platform, Turkey geologically is part of the great Alpide belt that extends from the Atlantic Ocean to the Himalaya Mountains. This belt was formed during the Paleogene Period, as the Arabian, African, and Indian continental plates began to collide with the Eurasian plate. This process is still at work today as the African plate converges with the Eurasian plate and the Anatolian plate escapes towards the west and southwest along strike-slip faults. These are the North Anatolian Fault Zone, which forms the present-day plate boundary of Eurasia near the Black Sea coast, and the East Anatolian Fault Zone, which forms part of the boundary of the North Arabian plate in the southeast. As a result, Turkey lies on one of the world's seismically most active regions.

However, many of the rocks exposed in Turkey were formed long before this process began. Turkey contains outcrops of Precambrian rocks, (more than 520 million years old; Bozkurt et al., 2000). The earliest geological history of Turkey is poorly understood, partly because of the problem of reconstructing how the region has been tectonically assembled by plate motions. Turkey can be thought of as a collage of different pieces (possibly terranes) of ancient continental and oceanic lithosphere stuck together by younger igneous, volcanic, and sedimentary rocks.

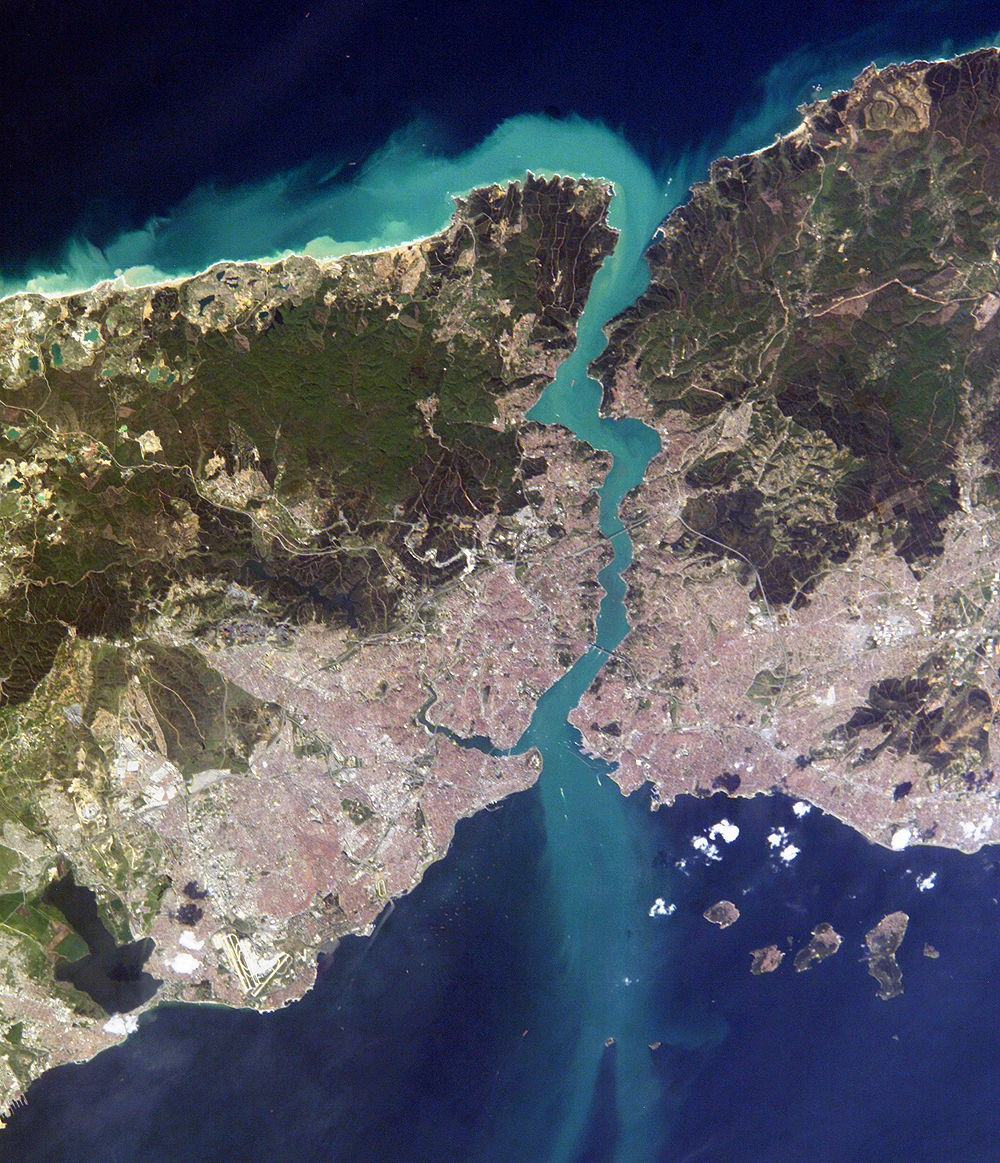
Istanbul and the Bosphorus.

During the Mesozoic era (about 250 to 66 million years ago) a large ocean (Tethys Ocean), floored by oceanic lithosphere existed in-between the supercontinents of Gondwana and Laurasia (which lay to the south and north respectively). This large oceanic plate was consumed at subduction zones (see subduction zone). At the subduction trenches the sedimentary rock layers that were deposited within the prehistoric Tethys Ocean buckled, were folded, faulted, and tectonically mixed with huge blocks of crystalline basement rocks of the oceanic lithosphere. These blocks form a very complex mixture or mélange of rocks that include mainly serpentinite, basalt, dolerite and chert. The Eurasian margin, now preserved in the Pontides (the Pontic Mountains along the Black Sea coast), is thought to have been geologically similar to the Western Pacific region today. Volcanic arcs (see volcanic arc) and backarc basins (see back-arc basin) formed and were emplaced onto Eurasia as ophiolites (see ophiolite) as they collided with microcontinents (literally relatively small plates of continental lithosphere). These microcontinents had been pulled away from the Gondwanan continent further south.

During the Cenozoic folding, faulting, and uplifting, accompanied by volcanic activity and intrusion of igneous rocks was related to major continental collision between the larger Arabian and Eurasian plates.

Present-day earthquakes range from barely perceptible tremors to major movements measuring five or higher on the open-ended Richter scale. Turkey's most severe earthquake in the twentieth century occurred in Erzincan on the night of December 28–29, 1939; it devastated most of the city and caused an estimated 160,000 deaths. Earthquakes of moderate intensity often continue with sporadic aftershocks over periods of several days or even weeks. The most earthquake-prone part of Turkey is an arc-shaped region stretching from the general vicinity of Kocaeli to the area north of Lake Van on the border with Armenia and Georgia.

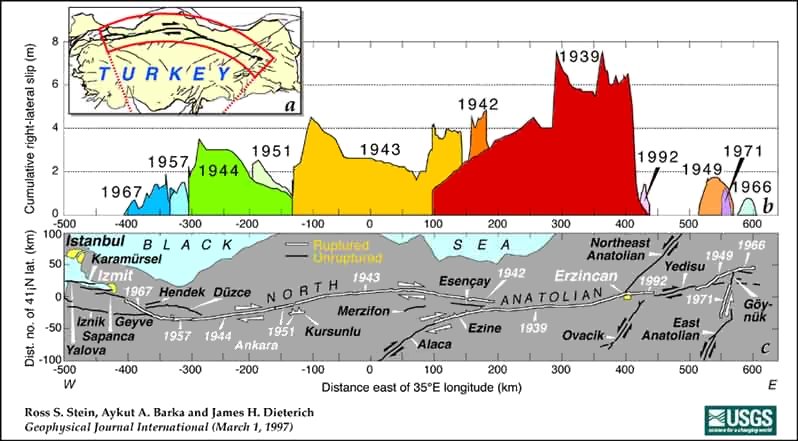
Fault lines and earthquakes.

Turkey's terrain is structurally complex. A central massif composed of uplifted blocks and downfolded troughs, covered by recent deposits and giving the appearance of a plateau with rough terrain, is wedged between two folded mountain ranges that converge in the east. True lowlands are confined to the Ergene Ovası (Ergene Plain) in Thrace, extending along rivers that discharge into the Aegean Sea or the Sea of Marmara, and to a few narrow coastal strips along the Black Sea and Mediterranean Sea coasts.

Nearly 85% of the land is at an elevation of at least 450 meters; the average and median altitude of the country is 1,332 and 1,128 meters, respectively. In Asiatic Turkey, flat or gently sloping land is rare and largely confined to the deltas of the Kızıl River, the coastal plains of Antalya and Adana, and the valley floors of the Gediz River and the Büyükmenderes River, and some interior high plains in Anatolia, mainly around Tuz Gölü (Salt Lake) and Konya Ovası (Konya Plain). Moderately sloping terrain is limited almost entirely outside Thrace to the hills of the Arabian Platform along the border with Syria.

More than 80% of the land surface is rough, broken, and mountainous, and therefore is of limited agricultural value. The terrain's ruggedness is accentuated in the eastern part of the country, where the two mountain ranges converge into a lofty region with a median elevation of more than 1,500 meters, which reaches its highest point along the borders with Armenia, Azerbaijan, and Iran. Turkey's highest peak, Mount Ararat (Ağrı Dağı) – 5,137 meters high – is situated near the point where the boundaries of the four countries meet.

== Climate ==
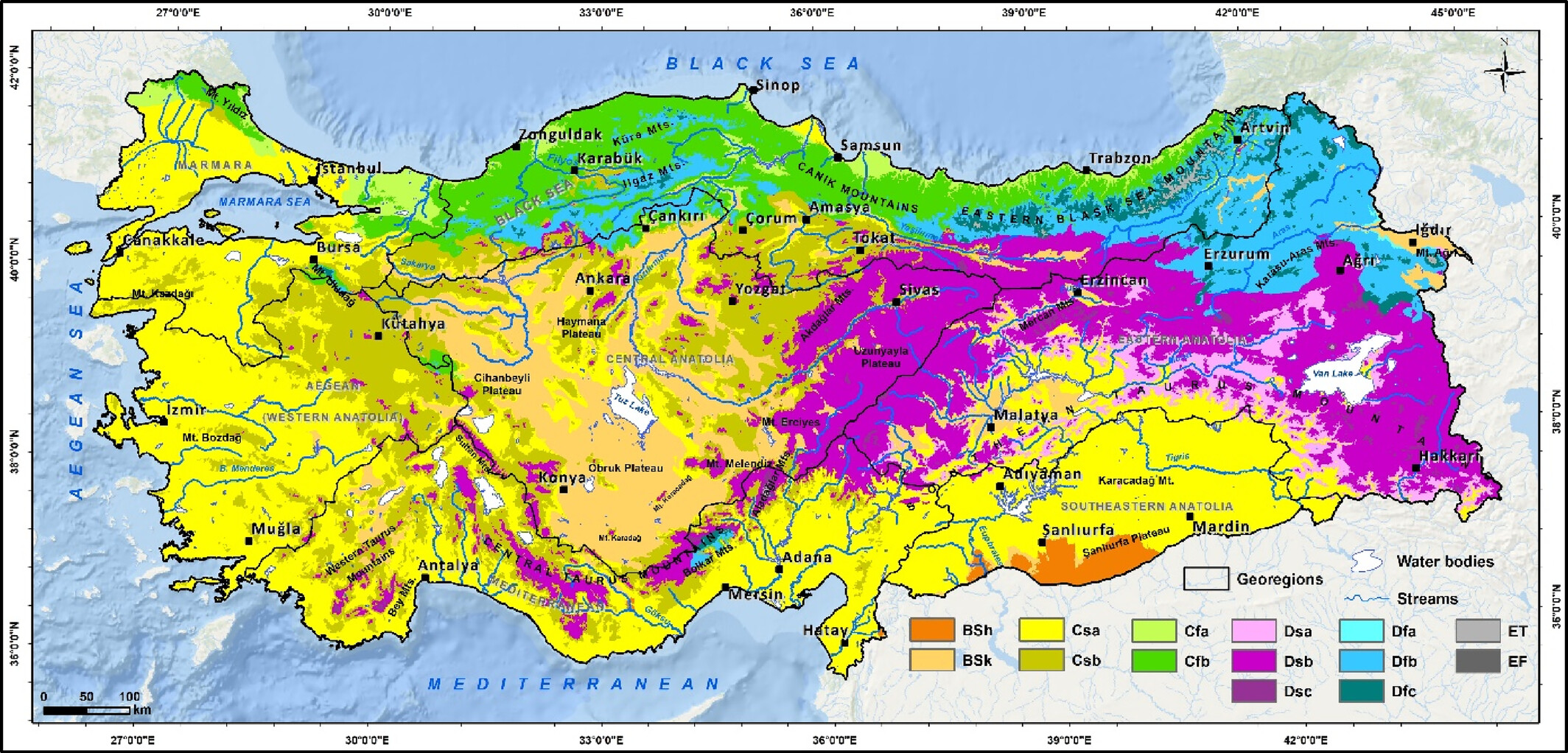
Köppen climate types of Turkey

Turkey's diverse regions have different climates, with the weather system on the coasts contrasting with that prevailing in the interior. The Aegean and Mediterranean coasts have cool, rainy winters and hot, moderately dry summers. Annual precipitation in those areas varies from 580 to 1,300 millimeters (22.8 to 51.2 in), depending on location. The Black Sea coast receives the greatest amount of precipitation and is the only region of Turkey that receives high precipitation throughout the year. The eastern part of that coast averages 2,500 millimeters (98.4 in) annually which is the highest precipitation in the country.

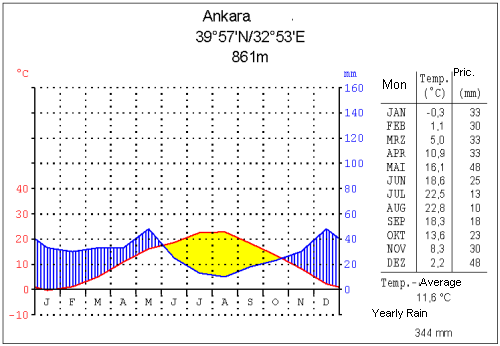
Ankara

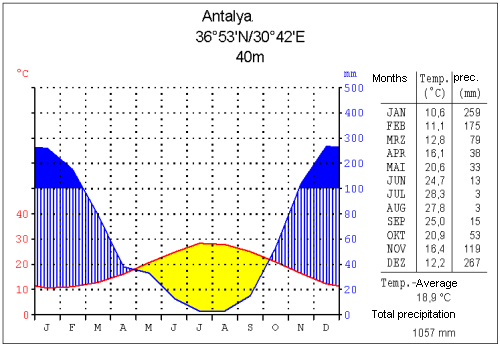
Antalya

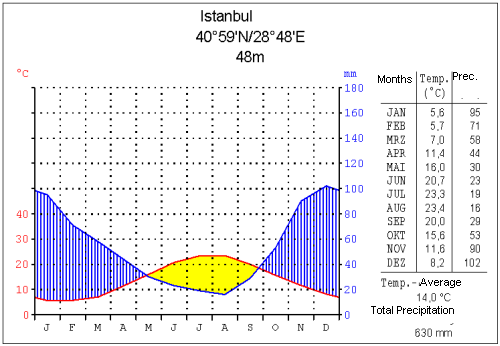
Istanbul

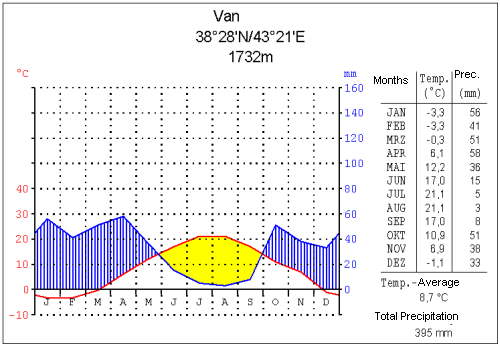
Van

Mountains close to the coast prevent Mediterranean influences from extending inland, giving the interior of Turkey a continental climate with distinct seasons. The Anatolian Plateau is much more subject to extremes than are the coastal areas. Winters on the plateau are especially severe. Temperatures of −30 to −40 °C (−22 to −40 °F) can occur in the mountainous areas in the east, and snow may lie on the ground 120 days of the year. In the west, winter temperatures average below 1 °C (33.8 °F). Summers are hot and dry, with temperatures above 30 °C (86 °F). Annual precipitation averages about 400 millimeters (15.7 in), with actual amounts determined by elevation. The driest regions are the Konya Ovasi and the Malatya Ovasi, where annual rainfall frequently is less than 300 millimeters (11.8 in). May is generally the wettest month and July and August the driest.

The climate of the Anti-Taurus Mountain region of eastern Turkey can be inhospitable. Summers tend to be hot and extremely dry. Winters are bitterly cold with frequent, heavy snowfall. Villages can be isolated for several days during winter storms. Spring and autumn are generally mild, but during both seasons sudden hot and cold spells frequently occur.

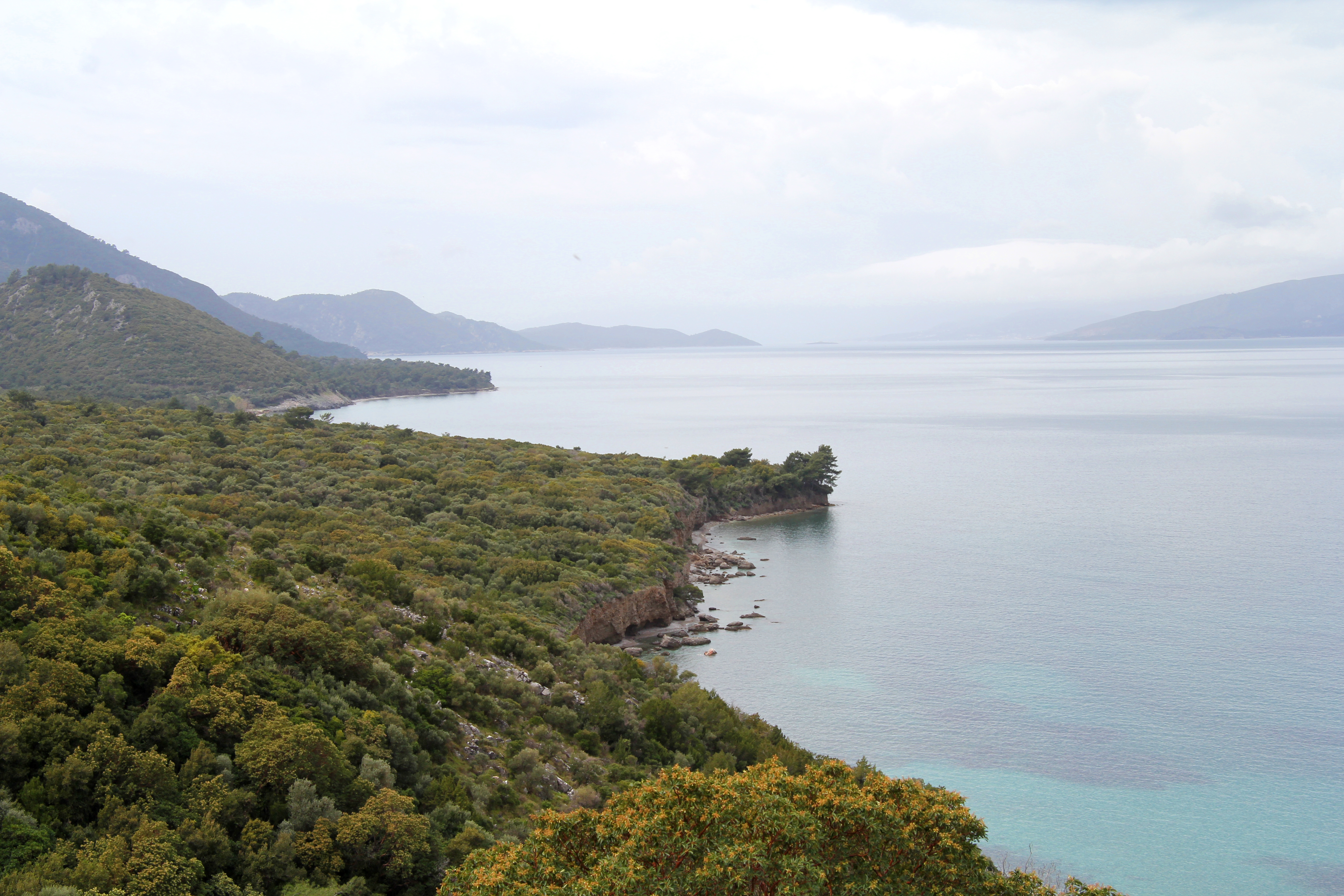
View of Dilek Peninsula-Büyük Menderes Delta National Park

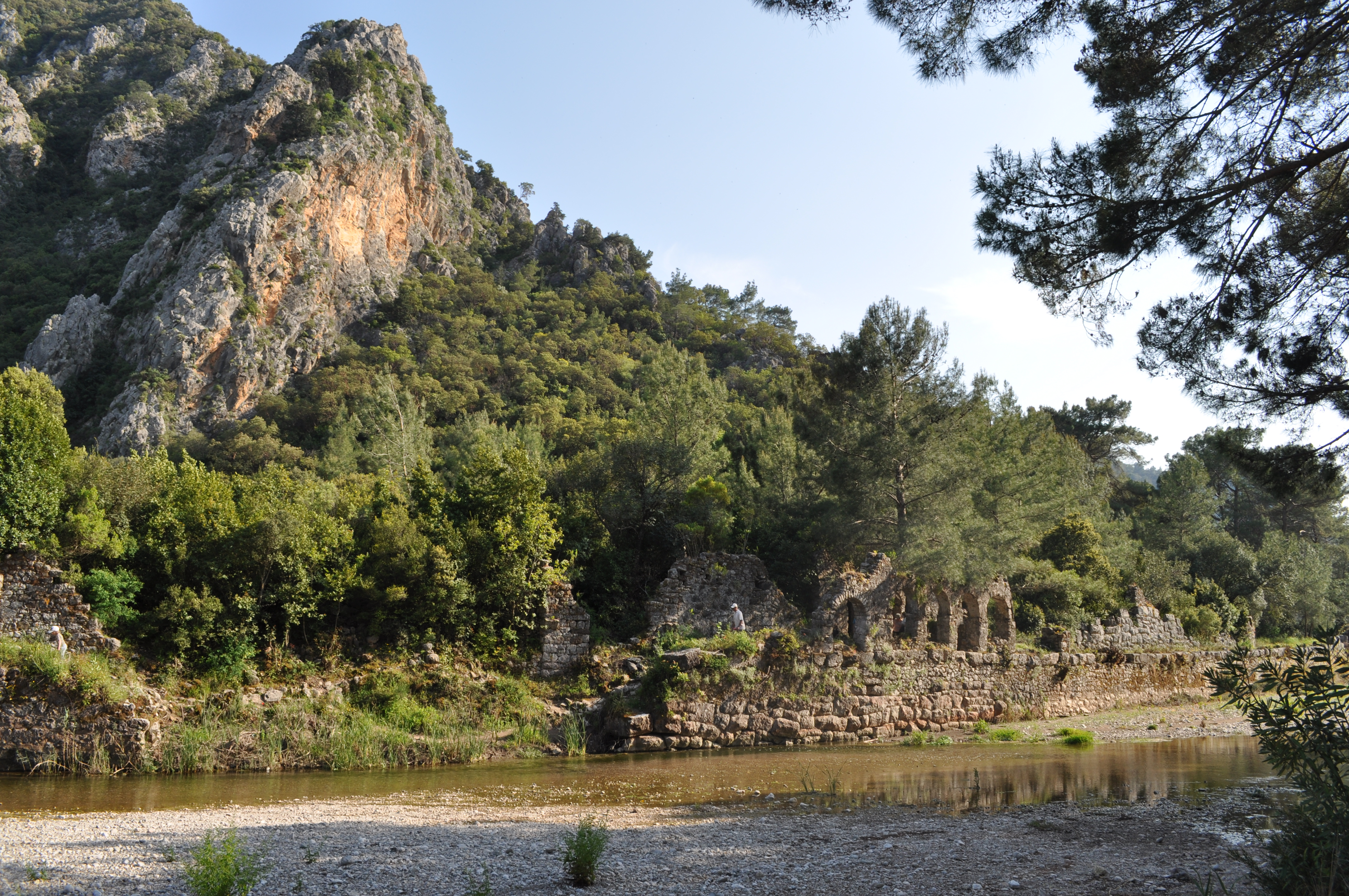
View of Beydağları Coastal National Park

== Natural hazards ==
Very severe earthquakes, especially on the North Anatolian Fault and East Anatolian Fault, occur along an arc extending from the Sea of Marmara in the west to Lake Van in the east. On August 17, 1999, a 7.4-magnitude earthquake struck northwestern Turkey, killing more than 17,000 and injuring 44,000.

Map of earthquakes in Turkey 1900–2023

Map showing the Anatolian Plate, the North Anatolian Fault and East Anatolian Fault in Turkey.

=== Current issues ===
Water pollution from dumping of chemicals and detergents; air pollution, particularly in urban areas; deforestation; concern for oil spills from increasing Bosphorus ship traffic.

=== Ratified international agreements ===
Air Pollution, Antarctic Treaty, Biodiversity, Desertification, Endangered Species, Hazardous Wastes, Ozone Layer Protection, Paris Agreement, Ship Pollution, Wetlands.

=== Signed but unratified international agreements ===
Environmental Modification, Kigali Amendment

== Hydrography ==
The Lakes region contains some of the largest lakes in Turkey, such as Lake Beyşehir, Lake Eğirdir, Lake Burdur, Lake Akşehir, Lake Eber and Lake Işıklı. Lake Tuz, Lake Akdoğan, Lake Nemrut, Lake Çıldır, Lake İznik, Lake Uluabat, Lake Manyas, Lake Sapanca, Lake Salda, Lake Meke and Lake Uzungöl are among other renowned lakes in Turkey. The rocks along the shoreline of Lake Salda were formed over time by microbes; these so-called microbialites provide some of the oldest known fossilized records of life. Studying these microbial fossils from Lake Salda has helped scientists prepare for NASA's Mars 2020 mission. In 2021, NASA reported that its Mars surface-exploring rover Perseverance showed that "the minerals and rock deposits at Lake Salda are the nearest match on Earth to those around the Jezero Crater where the spacecraft landed."

== See also ==
- Lakes of Turkey
- List of rivers of Turkey
- List of islands of Turkey
- List of beaches in Turkey
- List of mountains of Turkey
- List of volcanoes in Turkey
- List of caves in Turkey
- Forest in Turkey
- Geographical name changes in Turkey
- Flora of Turkey
- Soil in Turkey
