= Çandır (disambiguation) =

Çandır is the seat and largest town of the Çandır district of the Yozgat Province, Turkey.

Çandır may also refer to the following places in Turkey:

- Çandır, Çivril, a neighbourhood in the municipality and district of Çivril in the Denizli Province
- Çandır District, a district in the Yozgat Province of Turkey
- Çandır, Enez, a village in the Enez District of the Edirne Province
- Çandır, Kalecik, a village in the Kalecik District of the Ankara Province
- Çandır, Mersin, a village in the Toroslar District of the Mersin Province
  - Çandır Castle, a Byzantine castle near the village
- Çandır, Serik, a village in the Serik District of the Antalya Province
- Çandır, Zara, a village in the Zara district of the Sivas Province

== Other topics ==
Çandır, the Turkish name of Svetulka in Bulgaria

== See also ==
- Çandırlar, Feke, a village in Feke District of the Adana Province, Turkey
- Çandar
