= Kuzören =

Kuzören may refer to:

- Kuzören, Acıpayam
- Kuzören, Bayat, District of Bayat, Afyonkarahisar Province, Turkey
- Kuzören, Çerkeş
- Kuzören, Tercan
- Kuzören, Zara, District of Zara, Sivas Province, Turkey
