= Taşgöze, Zara =

Village in Sivas Province, Turkey

Sorkun
- Village
- Location in Turkey Sorkun (Turkey Central Anatolia)
- Coordinates: 39.652°N 37.893°E
- Country: Turkey
- Province: Sivas
- District: Zara
- Population (2023): 145
- Time zone: UTC+3 (TRT)

Taşgöze is a village in the Zara District of Sivas Province in Turkey. It is populated by Kurds and had a population of 145 in 2023.
