= Alişanağılı, Zara =

Village in Sivas Province, Turkey

Alişanağılı
- Village
- Location in Turkey Alişanağılı (Turkey Central Anatolia)
- Coordinates: 39.752°N 37.825°E
- Country: Turkey
- Province: Sivas
- District: Zara
- Population (2023): 17
- Time zone: UTC+3 (TRT)

Alişanağılı is a village in the Zara District of Sivas Province in Turkey. It is populated by Kurds and had a population of 17 in 2023.
