= Emirhan, Zara =

Village in Sivas Province, Turkey

Emirhan
- Village
- Location in Turkey Emirhan (Turkey Central Anatolia)
- Coordinates: 39.696°N 37.752°E
- Country: Turkey
- Province: Sivas
- District: Zara
- Population (2023): 59
- Time zone: UTC+3 (TRT)

Emirhan is a village in the Zara District of Sivas Province in Turkey. It is populated by Kurds and had a population of 59 in 2023.
