= Yoğunpelit, Zara =

Village in Sivas Province, Turkey

Yoğunpelit
- Village
- Location in Turkey Yoğunpelit (Turkey Central Anatolia)
- Coordinates: 39.682°N 37.780°E
- Country: Turkey
- Province: Sivas
- District: Zara
- Population (2023): 22
- Time zone: UTC+3 (TRT)

Yoğunpelit is a village in the Zara District of Sivas Province in Turkey. It is populated by Kurds and had a population of 22 in 2023.
