= Söğütözü, Zara =

Village in Sivas Province, Turkey

Söğütözü
- Village
- Location in Turkey Söğütözü (Turkey Central Anatolia)
- Coordinates: 39.668°N 38.032°E
- Country: Turkey
- Province: Sivas
- District: Zara
- Population (2023): 75
- Time zone: UTC+3 (TRT)

Söğütözü is a village in the Zara District of Sivas Province in Turkey. It is populated by Kurds and had a population of 75 in 2023.
