= Karahasan, Zara =

Village in Sivas Province, Turkey

Karahasan
- Village
- Location in Turkey Karahasan (Turkey Central Anatolia)
- Coordinates: 39.767°N 37.835°E
- Country: Turkey
- Province: Sivas
- District: Zara
- Population (2023): 30
- Time zone: UTC+3 (TRT)

Karahasan is a village in the Zara District of Sivas Province in Turkey. It is populated by Kurds and had a population of 30 in 2023.
