= Yolören, Zara =

Village in Sivas Province, Turkey

Yolören
- Village
- Location in Turkey Yolören (Turkey Central Anatolia)
- Coordinates: 39.827°N 37.962°E
- Country: Turkey
- Province: Sivas
- District: Zara
- Population (2023): 107
- Time zone: UTC+3 (TRT)

Yolören is a village in the Zara District of Sivas Province in Turkey. It is populated by Kurds and had a population of 107 in 2023.
