= Güllüali, Zara =

Village in Sivas Province, Turkey

Güllüali
- Village
- Location in Turkey Güllüali (Turkey Central Anatolia)
- Coordinates: 40.107°N 37.822°E
- Country: Turkey
- Province: Sivas
- District: Zara
- Population (2023): 37
- Time zone: UTC+3 (TRT)

Güllüali is a village in the Zara District of Sivas Province in Turkey. It is populated by Kurds and had a population of 37 in 2023.
