= Alişir, Zara =

Village in Sivas Province, Turkey

Alişir
- Village
- Location in Turkey Alişir (Turkey Central Anatolia)
- Coordinates: 40.118°N 37.792°E
- Country: Turkey
- Province: Sivas
- District: Zara
- Population (2023): 107
- Time zone: UTC+3 (TRT)

Alişir is a village in the Zara District of Sivas Province in Turkey. It is populated by Kurds and had a population of 107 in 2023.
