= Akdede, Zara =

Village in Sivas Province, Turkey

Akdede
- Village
- Location in Turkey Akdede (Turkey Central Anatolia)
- Coordinates: 39.721°N 37.790°E
- Country: Turkey
- Province: Sivas
- District: Zara
- Population (2023): 49
- Time zone: UTC+3 (TRT)

Akdede is a village in the Zara District of Sivas Province in Turkey. It is populated by Kurds and had a population of 49 in 2023.
