= Aşağıçamözü, Zara =

Village in Sivas Province, Turkey

Aşağıçamözü
- Village
- Location in Turkey Aşağıçamözü (Turkey Central Anatolia)
- Coordinates: 39.647°N 37.754°E
- Country: Turkey
- Province: Sivas
- District: Zara
- Population (2023): 30
- Time zone: UTC+3 (TRT)

Aşağıçamözü is a village in the Zara District of Sivas Province in Turkey. It is populated by Kurds and had a population of 30 in 2023.
