= Kabaktepeler, Zara =

Village in Sivas Province, Turkey

Kabaktepeler
- Village
- Location in Turkey Kabaktepeler (Turkey Central Anatolia)
- Coordinates: 39.842°N 37.993°E
- Country: Turkey
- Province: Sivas
- District: Zara
- Population (2023): 31
- Time zone: UTC+3 (TRT)

Kabaktepeler is a village in the Zara District of Sivas Province in Turkey. It is populated by Kurds and had a population of 31 in 2023.
