= Çevirmehan, Zara =

Village in Sivas Province, Turkey

Çevirmehan
- Village
- Location in Turkey Çevirmehan (Turkey Central Anatolia)
- Coordinates: 40.114°N 37.826°E
- Country: Turkey
- Province: Sivas
- District: Zara
- Population (2023): 109
- Time zone: UTC+3 (TRT)

Çevirmehan is a village in the Zara District of Sivas Province in Turkey. It is populated by Kurds and had a population of 109 in 2023.
