= Çandır =

- Municipality
- Location within Turkey Location within Turkey Central Anatolia
- Coordinates: 39°14′41″N 35°30′50″E
- Country: Turkey
- Province: Yozgat
- District: Çandır

Government
  - Mayor: Ertan Eroğlu (MHP)
- Elevation: 1,230 m (4,040 ft)
- Population (2022): 3,378
- Time zone: UTC+3 (TRT)
- Postal code: 66620
- Area code: 0354
- Website: www.candir.bel.tr

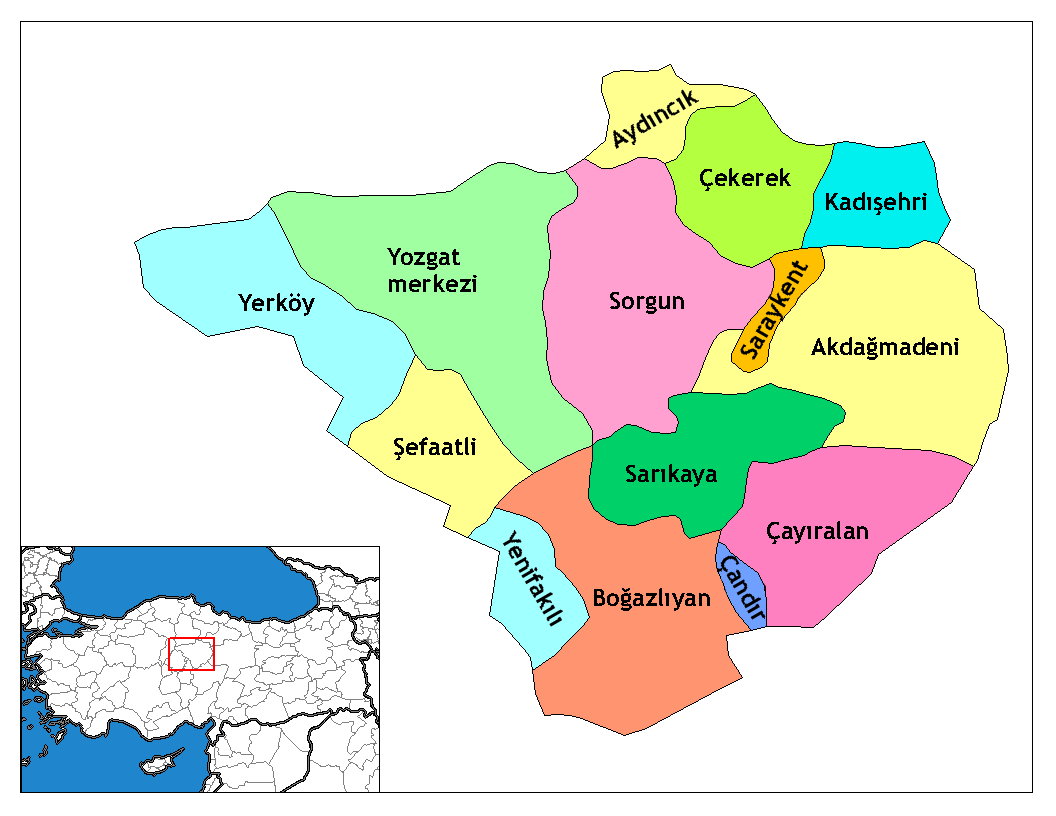
Map of the districts of Yozgat province in Turkey.

Çandır is a town in Yozgat Province in the Central Anatolia region of Turkey. It is the seat of Çandır District. Its population is 3,378 (2022).

== Geographical center of Turkey ==
According to area-weighted geometric centroid calculations conducted on the WGS84 reference ellipsoid using GADM and Natural Earth boundary datasets, the geographical center of Turkey (The Exact Center of Turkey) is located within the Eşrefpaşa locality of Çandır District (39°14′43.7″N 35°29′14.5″E).
