= Sancakkale, Zara =

Village in Sivas Province, Turkey

Sancakkale
- Village
- Location in Turkey Sancakkale (Turkey Central Anatolia)
- Coordinates: 39.486°N 37.590°E
- Country: Turkey
- Province: Sivas
- District: Zara
- Population (2023): 90
- Time zone: UTC+3 (TRT)

Sancakkale is a village in the Zara District of Sivas Province in Turkey. It is populated by Kurds and had a population of 90 in 2023.
