= Kumoğlu, Zara =

Village in Sivas Province, Turkey

Kumoğlu
- Village
- Location in Turkey Kumoğlu (Turkey Central Anatolia)
- Coordinates: 39.968°N 37.947°E
- Country: Turkey
- Province: Sivas
- District: Zara
- Population (2023): 132
- Time zone: UTC+3 (TRT)

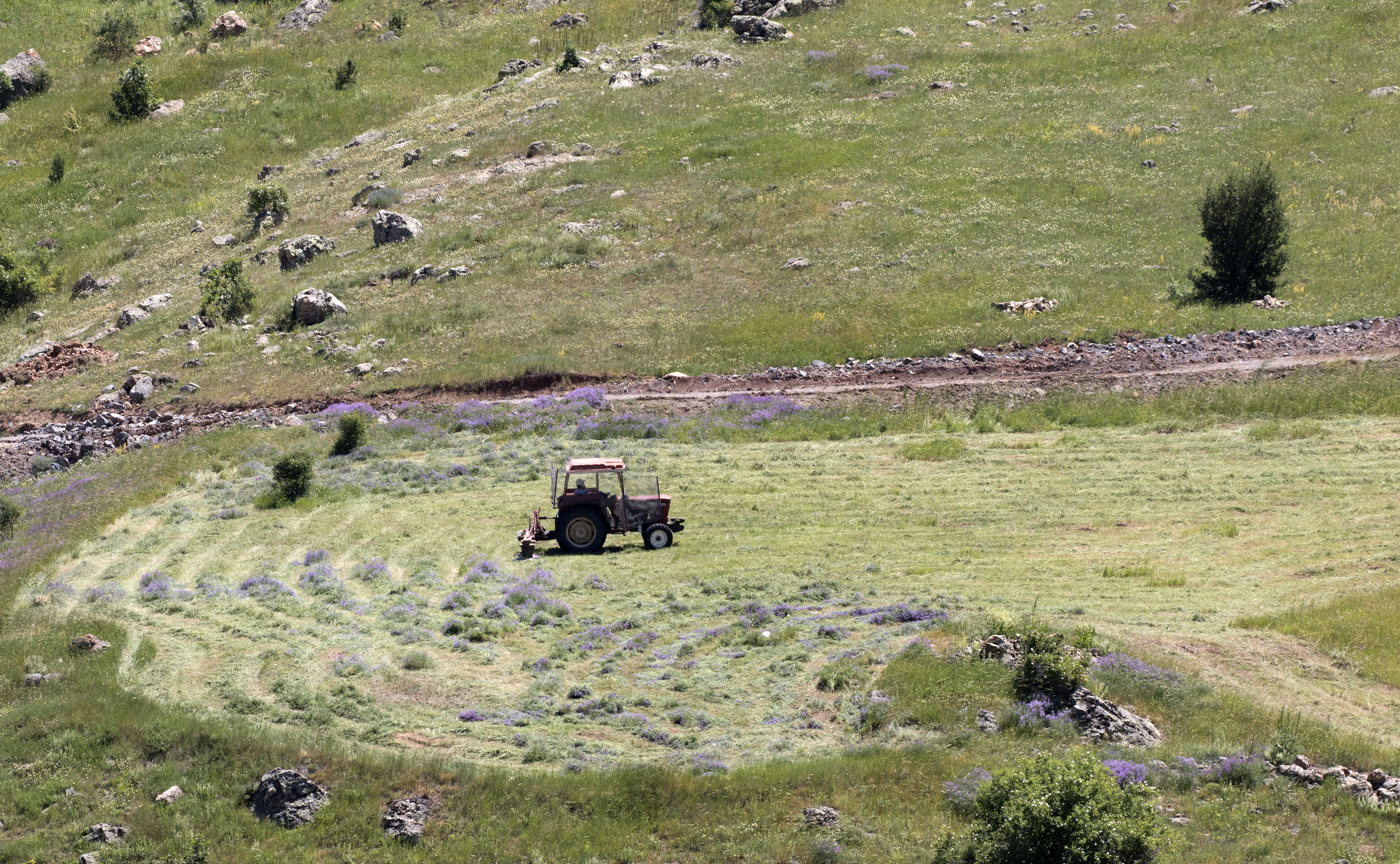
Field view in Kumoğlu, Zara - Sivas, Turkey.

Kumoğlu is a village in the Zara District of Sivas Province in Turkey. It is populated by Kurds and had a population of 132 in 2023.
