= Şenyayla, Zara =

Village in Sivas Province, Turkey

Şenyayla
- Village
- Location in Turkey Şenyayla (Turkey Central Anatolia)
- Coordinates: 40.119°N 37.848°E
- Country: Turkey
- Province: Sivas
- District: Zara
- Population (2023): 43
- Time zone: UTC+3 (TRT)

Şenyayla is a village in the Zara District of Sivas Province in Turkey. It is populated by Kurds and had a population of 43 in 2023.
