= Düzceli, Zara =

Village in Sivas Province, Turkey

Düzceli
- Village
- Location in Turkey Düzceli (Turkey Central Anatolia)
- Coordinates: 39.750°N 37.763°E
- Country: Turkey
- Province: Sivas
- District: Zara
- Population (2023): 35
- Time zone: UTC+3 (TRT)

Düzceli is a village in the Zara District of Sivas Province in Turkey. It is populated by Kurds and had a population of 35 in 2023.
