= Seten, Zara =

Village in Sivas Province, Turkey

Seten
- Village
- Location in Turkey Seten (Turkey Central Anatolia)
- Coordinates: 39.759°N 37.944°E
- Country: Turkey
- Province: Sivas
- District: Zara
- Population (2023): 19
- Time zone: UTC+3 (TRT)

Seten is a village in the Zara District of Sivas Province in Turkey. It is populated by Kurds and had a population of 19 in 2023.
