= Büyükgüney, Zara =

Village in Sivas Province, Turkey

Büyükgüney
- Village
- Location in Turkey Büyükgüney (Turkey Central Anatolia)
- Coordinates: 40.053°N 37.841°E
- Country: Turkey
- Province: Sivas
- District: Zara
- Population (2023): 26
- Time zone: UTC+3 (TRT)

Büyükgüney is a village in the Zara District of Sivas Province in Turkey. It is populated by Kurds and had a population of 26 in 2023.
