= Çaypınar, Zara =

Village in Sivas Province, Turkey

Çaypınar
- Village
- Location in Turkey Çaypınar (Turkey Central Anatolia)
- Coordinates: 39.750°N 37.788°E
- Country: Turkey
- Province: Sivas
- District: Zara
- Population (2023): 87
- Time zone: UTC+3 (TRT)

Çaypınar is a village in the Zara District of Sivas Province in Turkey. It is populated by Kurds and had a population of 87 in 2023.
