= Zara, Turkey =

Zara
- Municipality
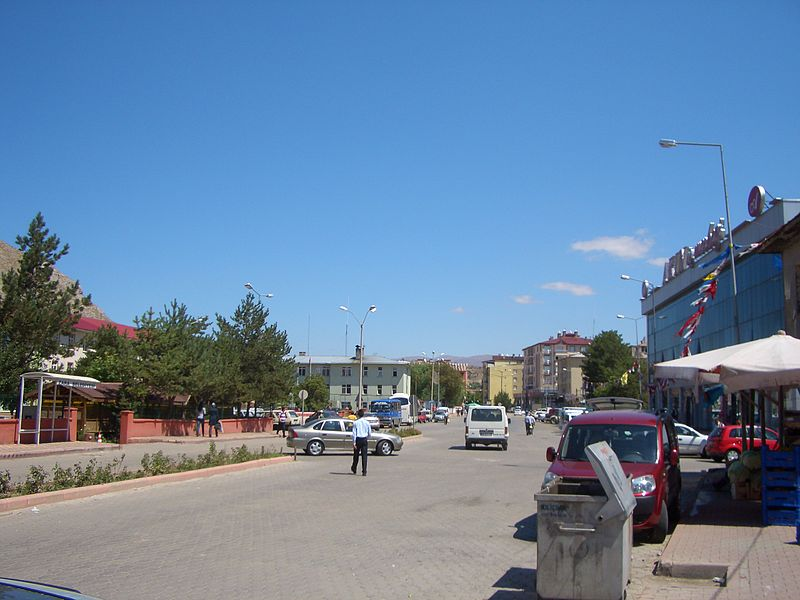
- A view from Zara city center

- Location within Turkey Location within Turkey Central Anatolia
- Coordinates: 39°53′42″N 37°45′11″E
- Country: Turkey
- Province: Sivas
- District: Zara

Government
  - Mayor: Fatih Celik (MHP)
- Elevation: 1,350 m (4,430 ft)
- Population (2022): 11,636
- Time zone: UTC+3 (TRT)
- Postal code: 58700
- Area code: 0346
- Website: www.zara.bel.tr

Zara is a town in Sivas Province of Turkey. It is the seat of Zara District. Its population is 11,636 (2022). The mayor is Fatih Celik (MHP). The town is 70 km. (appr. 45 miles) away from downtown Sivas.

== History ==
In antiquity, Zara (Ancient Greek: Ζάρα) was a town in the northern part of Armenia Minor, or perhaps more correctly in Pontus, on the road from Caesarea to Satala, and on the road from Arabissus to Nicopolis.

== Economy ==
Historically, silver was extracted from lead in Zara. Coal, asbestos, and arsenic were also produced in the area.

== Climate ==
Zara has a dry-summer humid continental climate (Köppen: Dsb), with warm, dry summers, and cold winters.

Climate data for Zara (1991–2020)
| Month | Jan | Feb | Mar | Apr | May | Jun | Jul | Aug | Sep | Oct | Nov | Dec | Year |
|---|---|---|---|---|---|---|---|---|---|---|---|---|---|
| Mean daily maximum °C (°F) | 1.4 (34.5) | 2.8 (37.0) | 8.5 (47.3) | 14.7 (58.5) | 19.6 (67.3) | 24.1 (75.4) | 28.0 (82.4) | 29.0 (84.2) | 24.9 (76.8) | 18.7 (65.7) | 10.7 (51.3) | 4.0 (39.2) | 15.6 (60.1) |
| Daily mean °C (°F) | −3.3 (26.1) | −2.3 (27.9) | 3.0 (37.4) | 8.4 (47.1) | 12.7 (54.9) | 16.5 (61.7) | 19.7 (67.5) | 20.2 (68.4) | 16.1 (61.0) | 11.1 (52.0) | 4.1 (39.4) | −0.8 (30.6) | 8.8 (47.8) |
| Mean daily minimum °C (°F) | −7.4 (18.7) | −6.9 (19.6) | −2.1 (28.2) | 2.3 (36.1) | 6.1 (43.0) | 8.8 (47.8) | 11.1 (52.0) | 11.3 (52.3) | 7.3 (45.1) | 4.0 (39.2) | −1.5 (29.3) | −4.8 (23.4) | 2.4 (36.3) |
| Average precipitation mm (inches) | 41.91 (1.65) | 35.82 (1.41) | 53.77 (2.12) | 76.01 (2.99) | 68.84 (2.71) | 43.2 (1.70) | 9.05 (0.36) | 7.62 (0.30) | 22.07 (0.87) | 47.53 (1.87) | 45.95 (1.81) | 44.68 (1.76) | 496.45 (19.55) |
| Average precipitation days (≥ 1.0 mm) | 7.4 | 7.0 | 8.3 | 11.2 | 10.6 | 6.8 | 2.4 | 1.9 | 3.4 | 6.6 | 6.9 | 7.7 | 80.2 |
| Average relative humidity (%) | 74.6 | 72.6 | 66.7 | 61.7 | 62.9 | 60.8 | 56.2 | 55.1 | 56.7 | 64.4 | 69.1 | 74.6 | 64.5 |
Source: NOAA

== Religion ==
- Saint Minas Church of Zara
