= Bulucan, Zara =

Village in Sivas Province, Turkey

Bulucan
- Village
- Location within Turkey Location within Turkey Central Anatolia
- Coordinates: 39.681°N 37.991°E
- Country: Turkey
- Province: Sivas
- District: Zara
- Population (2023): 137
- Time zone: UTC+3 (TRT)

Bulucan or Bolucan is a village in the Zara District of Sivas Province in Turkey. It is populated by Kurds and had a population of 137 in 2023.
