= Bektaşköy, Zara =

Village in Sivas Province, Turkey

Bektaşköy
- Village
- Location in Turkey Bektaşköy (Turkey Central Anatolia)
- Coordinates: 39.737°N 37.757°E
- Country: Turkey
- Province: Sivas
- District: Zara
- Population (2023): 41
- Time zone: UTC+3 (TRT)

Bektaşköy or Bektaş is a village in the Zara District of Sivas Province in Turkey. It is populated by Kurds and had a population of 41 in 2023.
