= Dipsizgöl, Zara =

Village in Sivas Province, Turkey

Dipsizgöl
- Village
- Location in Turkey Dipsizgöl (Turkey Central Anatolia)
- Coordinates: 39.738°N 37.956°E
- Country: Turkey
- Province: Sivas
- District: Zara
- Population (2023): 66
- Time zone: UTC+3 (TRT)

Dipsizgöl is a village in the Zara District of Sivas Province in Turkey. It is populated by Kurds and had a population of 66 in 2023.
