= Şerefiye, Zara =

Village in Sivas Province, Turkey

Şerefiye
- Village
- Location in Turkey Şerefiye (Turkey Central Anatolia)
- Coordinates: 40.119°N 37.761°E
- Country: Turkey
- Province: Sivas
- District: Zara
- Population (2023): 238
- Time zone: UTC+3 (TRT)

Şerefiye is a village in the Zara District of Sivas Province in Turkey. It is populated by Kurds among others and had a population of 238 in 2023.
