= Atkıran, Zara =

Village in Sivas Province, Turkey

Atkıran
- Village
- Location in Turkey Atkıran (Turkey Central Anatolia)
- Coordinates: 39.786°N 37.887°E
- Country: Turkey
- Province: Sivas
- District: Zara
- Population (2023): 63
- Time zone: UTC+3 (TRT)

Atkıran is a village in the Zara District of Sivas Province in Turkey. It is populated by Kurds and had a population of 63 in 2023.
