= Kızılkale, Zara =

Village in Sivas Province, Turkey

Kızılkale
- Village
- Location in Turkey Kızılkale (Turkey Central Anatolia)
- Coordinates: 39.736°N 37.930°E
- Country: Turkey
- Province: Sivas
- District: Zara
- Population (2023): 113
- Time zone: UTC+3 (TRT)

Kızılkale is a village in the Zara District of Sivas Province in Turkey. It is populated by Kurds and had a population of 113 in 2023.
