= Sorkun, Zara =

Village in Sivas Province, Turkey

Sorkun
- Village
- Location in Turkey Sorkun (Turkey Central Anatolia)
- Coordinates: 39.775°N 37.866°E
- Country: Turkey
- Province: Sivas
- District: Zara
- Population (2023): 18
- Time zone: UTC+3 (TRT)

Sorkun is a village in the Zara District of Sivas Province in Turkey. It is populated by Kurds and had a population of 18 in 2023.
