= Söğütlü, Zara =

Village in Sivas Province, Turkey

Söğütlü
- Village
- Location in Turkey Söğütlü (Turkey Central Anatolia)
- Coordinates: 40.036°N 37.811°E
- Country: Turkey
- Province: Sivas
- District: Zara
- Population (2023): 21
- Time zone: UTC+3 (TRT)

Söğütlü is a village in the Zara District of Sivas Province in Turkey. It is populated by Kurds and had a population of 21 in 2023.
