= Pazarcık, Zara =

Village in Sivas Province, Turkey

Pazarcık
- Village
- Location in Turkey Pazarcık (Turkey Central Anatolia)
- Coordinates: 39.664°N 37.816°E
- Country: Turkey
- Province: Sivas
- District: Zara
- Population (2023): 90
- Time zone: UTC+3 (TRT)

Pazarcık is a village in the Zara District of Sivas Province in Turkey. It is populated by Kurds and had a population of 90 in 2023.
