= Zara District =

District of Sivas Province, Turkey

- District
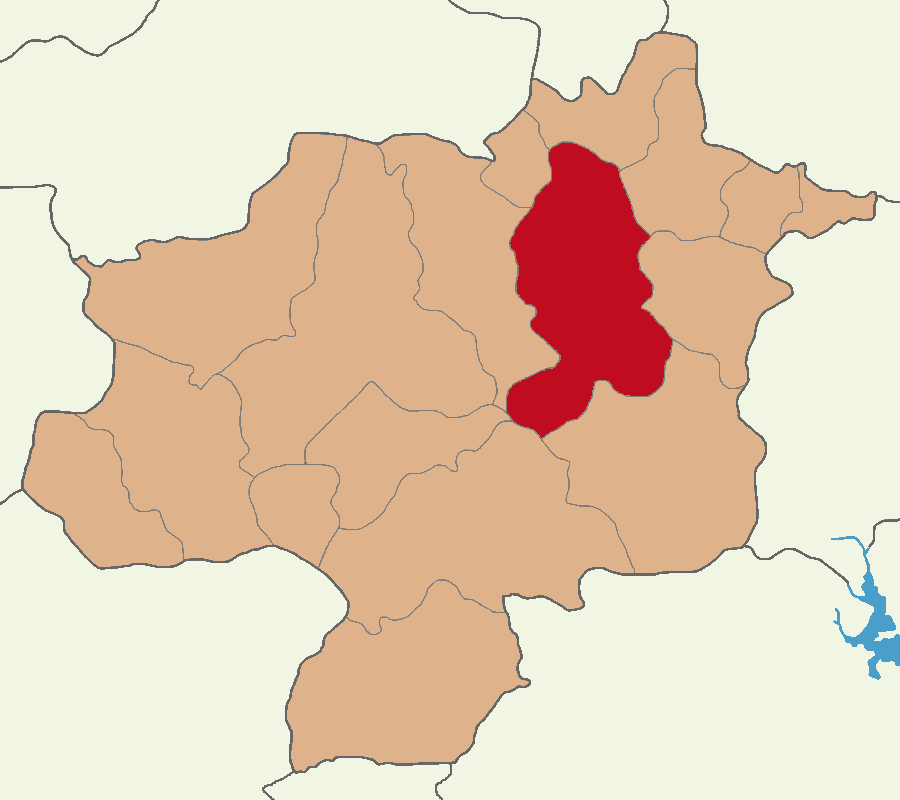
- Map showing Zara District in Sivas Province

- Location in Turkey Zara District (Turkey Central Anatolia)
- Coordinates: 39°54′N 37°45′E
- Country: Turkey
- Province: Sivas
- Seat: Zara

Government
  - Kaymakam: Meriç Dinçer
- Area: 2,616 km^{2} (1,010 sq mi)
- Population (2023): 23,873
  - Density: 9.1/km^{2} (24/sq mi)
- Time zone: UTC+3 (TRT)
- Website: www.zara.gov.tr

Zara District is a district of the Sivas Province of Turkey. Its seat is the town of Zara. Its area is 2,616 km^{2}, and its population is 23,873 (2022).

== Demographics ==
Zara District has a Sunni majority and a Kurdish Alevi minority. Lom families are moreover found in the district.

== Composition ==
There is one municipality in Zara District:

- Zara

There are 135 villages in Zara District:

- Adamfakı
- Ağlıkçay
- Ahmethacı
- Akdede
- Akdeğirmen
- Akören
- Akyazı
- Alıçbel
- Alıçlıseki
- Alişanağıllı
- Alişir
- Armutçayırı
- Aşağıçamöğü
- Aşağıçamurcu
- Aşağıkovacık
- Aşağımescit
- Atalan
- Atgeçmez
- Atkıran
- Avşar
- Bağlama
- Baharşeyh
- Ballıklar
- Becekli
- Bedirören
- Bektaşköy
- Belentarla
- Beypınarı
- Bozkır
- Bulucan
- Burhaniye
- Büyükgüney
- Büyükkaya
- Büyükköy
- Çandır
- Canova
- Çatören
- Çaylı
- Çaylıca
- Çaypınar
- Cemal
- Çevirmehan
- Çorak
- Çulhaali
- Danışık
- Derbent
- Deredam
- Dereköy
- Dilekpınarı
- Dipsizgöl
- Düzceli
- Ekinli
- Emirhan
- Esenler
- Evrencik
- Eymir
- Girit
- Göhertaş
- Göktepe
- Gölbaşı
- Güllüali
- Gümüşçevre
- İğdeli
- İğdir
- İkideğirmen
- Ilıca
- Kabaktepeler
- Kadriye
- Kanlıçayır
- Kaplan
- Karacahisar
- Karaçayır
- Karahasan
- Karaman
- Kardere
- Karslılar
- Kavasbaşı
- Kayabaşı
- Kayadibi
- Kayılıkaya
- Keçeyurdu
- Kelhasan
- Kevenli
- Kısık
- Kızık
- Kızılkale
- Korkut
- Körpınar
- Kümbet
- Kumoğlu
- Kurucaabat
- Kuruköprü
- Kürünlü
- Kuşçu
- Mahmutağaçiftliği
- Müslümabat
- Nasırköy
- Osmaniye
- Pazarbeleni
- Pazarcık
- Şafaklı
- Sancakkale
- Sarıyusuf
- Sedille
- Selimiye
- Şenyayla
- Şerefiye
- Seten
- Söğütlü
- Söğütlüağıl
- Söğütözü
- Sorkun
- Sucak
- Taşgöze
- Tepeköy
- Tödürge
- Topaktaş
- Tuzlagözü
- Üngür
- Ütük
- Ütükyurdu
- Yapak
- Yarağıl
- Yarımkaya
- Yayıközü
- Yeşildere
- Yeşilköy
- Yeşimli
- Yıkılgan
- Yoğunpelit
- Yolören
- Yukarıçamözü
- Yukarıçamurcu
- Yukarımescit
- Zoğallı
