= Becekli, Zara =

Village in Sivas Province, Turkey

Becekli
- Village
- Location in Turkey Becekli (Turkey Central Anatolia)
- Coordinates: 40.094°N 37.806°E
- Country: Turkey
- Province: Sivas
- District: Zara
- Population (2023): 94
- Time zone: UTC+3 (TRT)

Becekli is a village in the Zara District of Sivas Province in Turkey. It is populated by Kurds and had a population of 94 in 2023.
