= Osmaniye, Zara =

Village in Sivas Province, Turkey

Osmaniye
- Village
- Location in Turkey Osmaniye (Turkey Central Anatolia)
- Coordinates: 39.809°N 37.841°E
- Country: Turkey
- Province: Sivas
- District: Zara
- Population (2023): 96
- Time zone: UTC+3 (TRT)

Osmaniye is a village in the Zara District of Sivas Province in Turkey. It is inhabited by Lezgins and had a population of 96 in 2023.
