= Saint Minas Church of Zara =

Apostolic church in Turkey

Coordinates: 39°54′35″N 37°56′18″E

Saint Minas church of Zara
- Saint Minas church of Zara
- Location: Müslümabat, Zara, Sivas Province, Turkey
- Country: Armenia
- Religious institute: Armenian Apostolic church

History
- Founded: 13th-century

Architecture
- Functional status: dilapidated

St Minas (Armenian: Սուրբ Մինաս) is a 13th-century Armenian Apostolic Christian church located in the village of Alakilise, Zara city, Sivas Province, Turkey.

The church is located on the rock of Kızılırmak (Alice). Saint Minas of Zara is also known as Ala (Ala Kilise), after which the village was named.

== History ==
After the Armenian Genocide, the church was used for many years as a mosque in the village of Alakilise, before the construction of a new mosque.

It was also used as a warehouse and a stable. Saint Minas was repeatedly destroyed by treasure hunters.

The church is now registered as a cultural heritage object.

== Status ==
The church is abandoned and in a dilapidated state.
