= Yukarıçamurcu, Zara =

Village in Sivas Province, Turkey

Yukarıçamurcu
- Village
- Location in Turkey Yukarıçamurcu (Turkey Central Anatolia)
- Coordinates: 39.627°N 37.987°E
- Country: Turkey
- Province: Sivas
- District: Zara
- Population (2023): 136
- Time zone: UTC+3 (TRT)

Yukarıçamurcu is a village in the Zara District of Sivas Province in Turkey. It is populated by Kurds and had a population of 136 in 2023.
