= Belentarla, Zara =

Village in Sivas Province, Turkey

Belentarla
- Village
- Location in Turkey Belentarla (Turkey Central Anatolia)
- Coordinates: 39.459°N 37.618°E
- Country: Turkey
- Province: Sivas
- District: Zara
- Population (2023): 57
- Time zone: UTC+3 (TRT)

Belentarla is a village in the Zara District of Sivas Province in Turkey. It is populated by Kurds of the Ginîyan tribe and had a population of 57 in 2023.

== History ==
The village's name was recorded as Eski Hargün in 1928 and as Muratpaşa in 1960.

== Geography ==
The village is located 145 km from the Sivas city center and 84 km from the Zara district center.
