= Yukarımescit, Zara =

Village in Sivas Province, Turkey

Yukarımescit
- Village
- Location in Turkey Yukarımescit (Turkey Central Anatolia)
- Coordinates: 39.658°N 37.938°E
- Country: Turkey
- Province: Sivas
- District: Zara
- Population (2023): 19
- Time zone: UTC+3 (TRT)

Yukarımescit is a village in the Zara District of Sivas Province in Turkey. It is populated by Kurds and had a population of 19 in 2023.
