= Beypınarı, Zara =

Village in Sivas Province, Turkey

Beypınarı
- Village
- Location in Turkey Beypınarı (Turkey Central Anatolia)
- Coordinates: 39.514°N 37.710°E
- Country: Turkey
- Province: Sivas
- District: Zara
- Population (2023): 152
- Time zone: UTC+3 (TRT)

Beypınarı (Kurdish: Bekpar) is a village in the Zara District of Sivas Province in Turkey. It is populated by Kurds of the Ginîyan tribe and had a population of 152 in 2023.
