= Selimiye, Zara =

Village in Sivas Province, Turkey

Selimiye
- Village
- Location in Turkey Selimiye (Turkey Central Anatolia)
- Coordinates: 39.652°N 37.688°E
- Country: Turkey
- Province: Sivas
- District: Zara
- Population (2023): 28
- Time zone: UTC+3 (TRT)

Selimiye is a village in the Zara District of Sivas Province in Turkey. It is inhabited by Lezgins and had a population of 28 in 2023.
