= Kuruköprü, Zara =

Village in Sivas Province, Turkey

Kuruköprü
- Village
- Location in Turkey Kuruköprü (Turkey Central Anatolia)
- Coordinates: 39.491°N 37.596°E
- Country: Turkey
- Province: Sivas
- District: Zara
- Population (2023): 25
- Time zone: UTC+3 (TRT)

Kuruköprü is a village in the Zara District of Sivas Province in Turkey. It is populated by Kurds and had a population of 25 in 2023.
