= Çulhaali, Zara =

Village in Sivas Province, Turkey

Çulhaali
- Village
- Location in Turkey Çulhaali (Turkey Central Anatolia)
- Coordinates: 39.657°N 37.774°E
- Country: Turkey
- Province: Sivas
- District: Zara
- Population (2023): 14
- Time zone: UTC+3 (TRT)

Çulhaali is a village in the Zara District of Sivas Province in Turkey. It is populated by Kurds and had a population of 14 in 2023.
