= Bağlama, Zara =

Village in Sivas Province, Turkey

Bağlama
- Village
- Location in Turkey Bağlama (Turkey Central Anatolia)
- Coordinates: 39.787°N 37.814°E
- Country: Turkey
- Province: Sivas
- District: Zara
- Population (2023): 39
- Time zone: UTC+3 (TRT)

Bağlama is a village in the Zara District of Sivas Province in Turkey. It is predominantly populated by Kurds and had a population of 39 in 2023.
