= Göktepe, Zara =

Village in Sivas Province, Turkey

Göktepe
- Village
- Location in Turkey Göktepe (Turkey Central Anatolia)
- Coordinates: 40.096°N 37.774°E
- Country: Turkey
- Province: Sivas
- District: Zara
- Population (2023): 71
- Time zone: UTC+3 (TRT)

Göktepe is a village in the Zara District of Sivas Province in Turkey. It is populated by Kurds and had a population of 71 in 2023.
