= Karslılar, Zara =

Village in Sivas Province, Turkey

Karslılar
- Village
- Location in Turkey Karslılar (Turkey Central Anatolia)
- Coordinates: 39.659°N 37.745°E
- Country: Turkey
- Province: Sivas
- District: Zara
- Population (2023): 77
- Time zone: UTC+3 (TRT)

Karslılar is a village in the Zara District of Sivas Province in Turkey. It is populated by Kurds and had a population of 77 in 2023.
