= Aşağımescit, Zara =

Village in Sivas Province, Turkey

Aşağımescit
- Village
- Location in Turkey Aşağımescit (Turkey Central Anatolia)
- Coordinates: 39.643°N 37.947°E
- Country: Turkey
- Province: Sivas
- District: Zara
- Population (2023): 163
- Time zone: UTC+3 (TRT)

Aşağımescit is a village in the Zara District of Sivas Province in Turkey. It is populated by Kurds and had a population of 163 in 2023.
