= Kardere, Zara =

Village in Sivas Province, Turkey

Kardere
- Village
- Location in Turkey Kardere (Turkey Central Anatolia)
- Coordinates: 39.659°N 38.011°E
- Country: Turkey
- Province: Sivas
- District: Zara
- Population (2023): 63
- Time zone: UTC+3 (TRT)

Kardere is a village in the Zara District of Sivas Province in Turkey. It is populated by Kurds and had a population of 63 in 2023.
