= Karaman, Zara =

Village in Sivas Province, Turkey

Karaman
- Village
- Location in Turkey Karaman (Turkey Central Anatolia)
- Coordinates: 39.799°N 37.946°E
- Country: Turkey
- Province: Sivas
- District: Zara
- Population (2023): 62
- Time zone: UTC+3 (TRT)

Karaman is a village in the Zara District of Sivas Province in Turkey. It is populated by Kurds and had a population of 62 in 2023.
