= Evrencik, Zara =

Village in Sivas Province, Turkey

Evrencik
- Village
- Location in Turkey Evrencik (Turkey Central Anatolia)
- Coordinates: 39.697°N 38.060°E
- Country: Turkey
- Province: Sivas
- District: Zara
- Population (2023): 15
- Time zone: UTC+3 (TRT)

Evrencik is a village in the Zara District of Sivas Province in Turkey. It is populated by Kurds and had a population of 15 in 2023.
