= İğdeli, Zara =

Village in Sivas Province, Turkey

İğdeli
- Village
- Location in Turkey İğdeli (Turkey Central Anatolia)
- Coordinates: 39.498°N 37.582°E
- Country: Turkey
- Province: Sivas
- District: Zara
- Population (2023): 88
- Time zone: UTC+3 (TRT)

İğdeli is a village in the Zara District of Sivas Province in Turkey. It is populated by Kurds and had a population of 88 in 2023.
