= Üngür, Zara =

Village in Sivas Province, Turkey

Üngür
- Village
- Location in Turkey Üngür (Turkey Central Anatolia)
- Coordinates: 39.781°N 37.735°E
- Country: Turkey
- Province: Sivas
- District: Zara
- Population (2023): 24
- Time zone: UTC+3 (TRT)

Üngür is a village in the Zara District of Sivas Province in Turkey. It is populated by Kurds and had a population of 24 in 2023.
