= Büyükkaya, Zara =

Village in Sivas Province, Turkey

Büyükkaya
- Village
- Location in Turkey Büyükkaya (Turkey Central Anatolia)
- Coordinates: 39.674°N 37.802°E
- Country: Turkey
- Province: Sivas
- District: Zara
- Population (2023): 42
- Time zone: UTC+3 (TRT)

Büyükkaya is a village in the Zara District of Sivas Province in Turkey. It is populated by Kurds and had a population of 42 in 2023.
