= Armutçayırı, Zara =

Village in Sivas Province, Turkey

Armutçayırı
- Village
- Location in Turkey Armutçayırı (Turkey Central Anatolia)
- Coordinates: 40.091°N 37.727°E
- Country: Turkey
- Province: Sivas
- District: Zara
- Population (2023): 120
- Time zone: UTC+3 (TRT)

Armutçayırı is a village in the Zara District of Sivas Province in Turkey. It is populated by Kurds and had a population of 120 in 2023.
