= Ağlıkçay, Zara =

Village in Sivas Province, Turkey

Ağlıkçay
- Village
- Location in Turkey Ağlıkçay (Turkey Central Anatolia)
- Coordinates: 39.536°N 37.762°E
- Country: Turkey
- Province: Sivas
- District: Zara
- Population (2023): 34
- Time zone: UTC+3 (TRT)

Ağlıkçay is a village in the Zara District of Sivas Province in Turkey. It is populated by Kurds of the Ginîyan tribe and had a population of 34 in 2023.
