= Ballıklar, Zara =

Village in Sivas Province, Turkey

Ballıklar
- Village
- Location in Turkey Ballıklar (Turkey Central Anatolia)
- Coordinates: 39.821°N 37.983°E
- Country: Turkey
- Province: Sivas
- District: Zara
- Population (2023): 33
- Time zone: UTC+3 (TRT)

Ballıklar is a village in the Zara District of Sivas Province in Turkey. It is populated by Kurds and had a population of 33 in 2023.
