= Cemal, Zara =

Village in Sivas Province, Turkey

Cemal
- Village
- Location in Turkey Cemal (Turkey Central Anatolia)
- Coordinates: 39.758°N 37.918°E
- Country: Turkey
- Province: Sivas
- District: Zara
- Population (2023): 11
- Time zone: UTC+3 (TRT)

Cemal is a village in the Zara District of Sivas Province in Turkey. It is populated by Kurds and had a population of 11 in 2023.
