= Zoğallı, Zara =

Village in Sivas Province, Turkey

Zoğallı
- Village
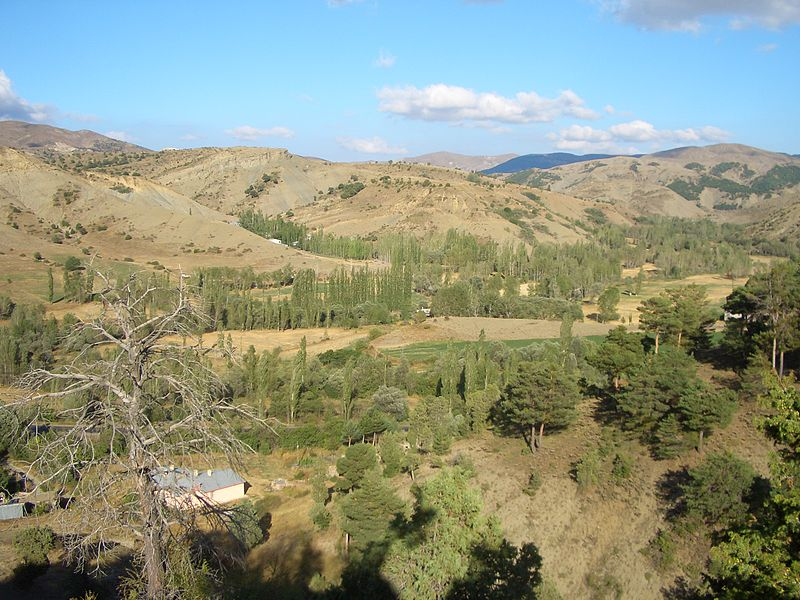

- Location within Turkey Location within Turkey Central Anatolia
- Coordinates: 39.623°N 37.807°E
- Country: Turkey
- Province: Sivas
- District: Zara
- Population (2023): 52
- Time zone: UTC+3 (TRT)

Zoğallı is a village in the Zara District of Sivas Province in Turkey. It is populated by Kurds and had a population of 52 in 2023.
