= Girit, Zara =

Village in Sivas Province, Turkey

Girit
- Village
- Location in Turkey Girit (Turkey Central Anatolia)
- Coordinates: 39.732°N 37.898°E
- Country: Turkey
- Province: Sivas
- District: Zara
- Population (2023): 106
- Time zone: UTC+3 (TRT)

Girit is a village in the Zara District of Sivas Province in Turkey. It is populated by Turks and had a population of 106 in 2023.
