= Pazarbeleni, Zara =

Village in Sivas Province, Turkey

Pazarbeleni
- Village
- Location in Turkey Pazarbeleni (Turkey Central Anatolia)
- Coordinates: 40.131°N 37.842°E
- Country: Turkey
- Province: Sivas
- District: Zara
- Population (2023): 82
- Time zone: UTC+3 (TRT)

Pazarbeleni is a village in the Zara District of Sivas Province in Turkey. It is populated by Kurds and had a population of 82 in 2023.
