= GADM =

Database of administrative boundaries

Global Administrative Database (GADM)
- Level 1 administrative divisions of Germany, created from GADM data
- Original author: Robert J. Hijmans
- Release: 2009; 17 years ago
- Stable release: 4.1 / 16 July 2022; 3 years ago
- Written in: GeoPackage
- Type: Geographic information systems, data visualization
- License: Copyrighted with academic friendly policy
- Website: gadm.org

GADM, the Database of Global Administrative Areas, is a high-resolution database of country administrative areas, with a goal of "all countries, at all levels, at any time period." Although it is a public database, GADM has a higher spatial resolution than other free databases, and also higher than commercial software such as ArcGIS. Those sources are commonly use to complete data analysis with data visualisation such as data plots, choropleth map, etc.

== Format ==
The database is available in a few export formats, including shapefiles that are used in most common GIS applications. Files for use with the data analysis language R are also available.

== License ==
GADM is not freely available for commercial use. The GADM project created the spatial data for many countries from spatial databases provided by national governments, NGO, and/or from maps and lists of names available on the Internet (e.g. from Wikipedia).

== See also ==
- Natural Earth
