= Çandır, Zara =

Village in Sivas Province, Turkey

Çandır
- Village
- Location in Turkey Çandır (Turkey Central Anatolia)
- Coordinates: 39.801°N 37.999°E
- Country: Turkey
- Province: Sivas
- District: Zara
- Population (2023): 13
- Time zone: UTC+3 (TRT)

Çandır is a village in the Zara District of Sivas Province in Turkey. It is populated by Kurds and had a population of 13 in 2023. It is the least populated village in the district.
