= Çandır District =

District of Yozgat Province, Turkey

- District
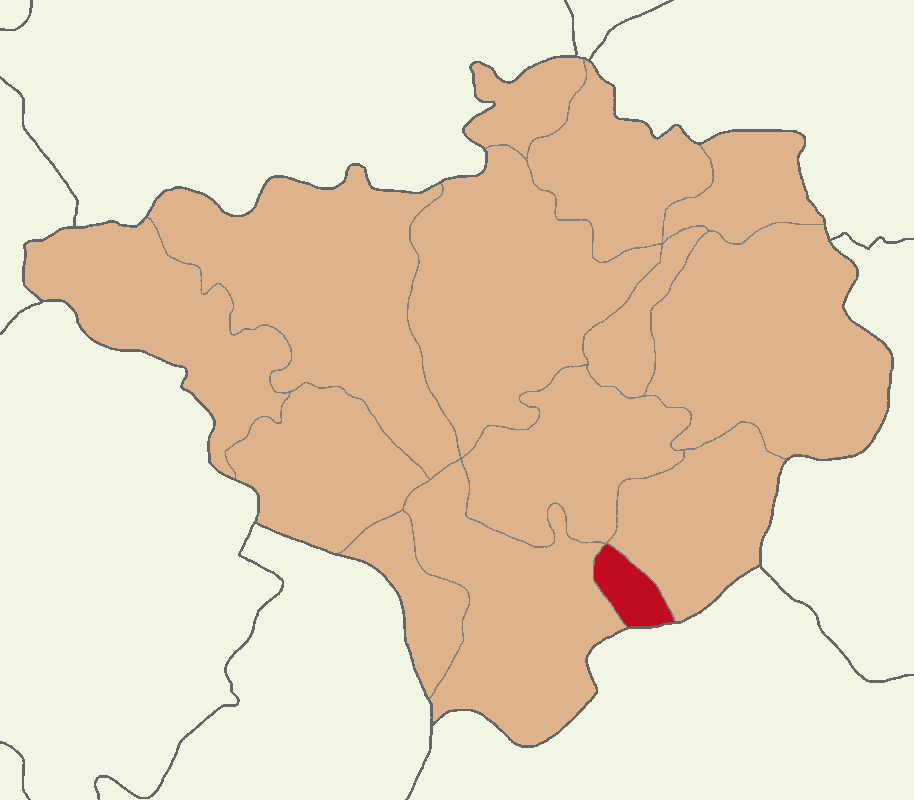
- Map showing Çandır District in Yozgat Province

- Location in Turkey Çandır District (Turkey Central Anatolia)
- Coordinates: 39°15′N 35°31′E
- Country: Turkey
- Province: Yozgat
- Seat: Çandır

Government
  - Kaymakam: Tugay Cingirt
- Area: 205 km^{2} (79 sq mi)
- Population (2022): 4,227
  - Density: 21/km^{2} (53/sq mi)
- Time zone: UTC+3 (TRT)
- Website: www.candir.gov.tr

Çandır District is a district of the Yozgat Province of Turkey. Its seat is the town of Çandır. Its area is 205 km^{2}, and its population is 4,227 (2022).

== Composition ==
There is one municipality in Çandır District:

- Çandır

There are four villages in Çandır District:

- Büyükkışla
- Gülpınar
- İğdeli
- Kozan
