= Akyazı, Zara =

Village in Sivas Province, Turkey

Akyazı
- Village
- Location in Turkey Akyazı (Turkey Central Anatolia)
- Coordinates: 39°46′34″N 37°44′22″E
- Country: Turkey
- Province: Sivas
- District: Zara
- Population (2023): 15
- Time zone: UTC+3 (TRT)

Akyazı, also known as Kuzören, is a village in the Zara District of Sivas Province in Turkey. It is populated by Kurds and had a population of 15 in 2023.
