= Natural Earth =

Public domain geographic data collection

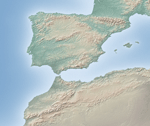
Example of a public domain map in the Natural Earth database

Natural Earth is a public domain map dataset available at 1:10 million (1 cm = 100 km), 1:50 million, and 1:110 million map scales. Natural Earth's data set contains integrated vector and raster mapping data.

The original authors of the map dataset are Tom Patterson and Nathaniel Vaughn Kelso, but Natural Earth has expanded to be a collaboration of many volunteers and is supported by the North American Cartographic Information Society (NACIS). It is free for public use in any type of project.

The dataset includes the fictitious 1-meter-square Null Island at 0°N 0°E for error-checking purposes.

== Public domain data and software ==
All versions of Natural Earth raster and vector map data on the Natural Earth website are in the public domain. Anyone may use the maps in any manner, including modifying the content and design.

== Crimea and the 'de facto' border standard ==
To avoid dealing with border disputes, Natural Earth uses a "de facto control" standard for where to draw borders, causing – for example – Taiwan to be shown as independent but Crimea as part of Russia, and Palestine as part of Israel. This policy draws regular criticism from Ukraine and allies as 'Mapaganda'. Working around this is possible but is generally regarded as a significant hassle. The policy routinely faces complaints on GitHub (generally focused around a 'de facto' standard being in the interests of oppressors, and inconsistent application of the policy, e.g. not showing Ukrainian-controlled areas of Russia as Ukrainian), with a maintainer referring to the Crimea problem as "permanently open ... issues" that "steals our rare time".

== See also ==
- Natural Earth projection
- OpenStreetMap
