= Pareidolia =

Perception of meaningful patterns or images in random or vague stimuli

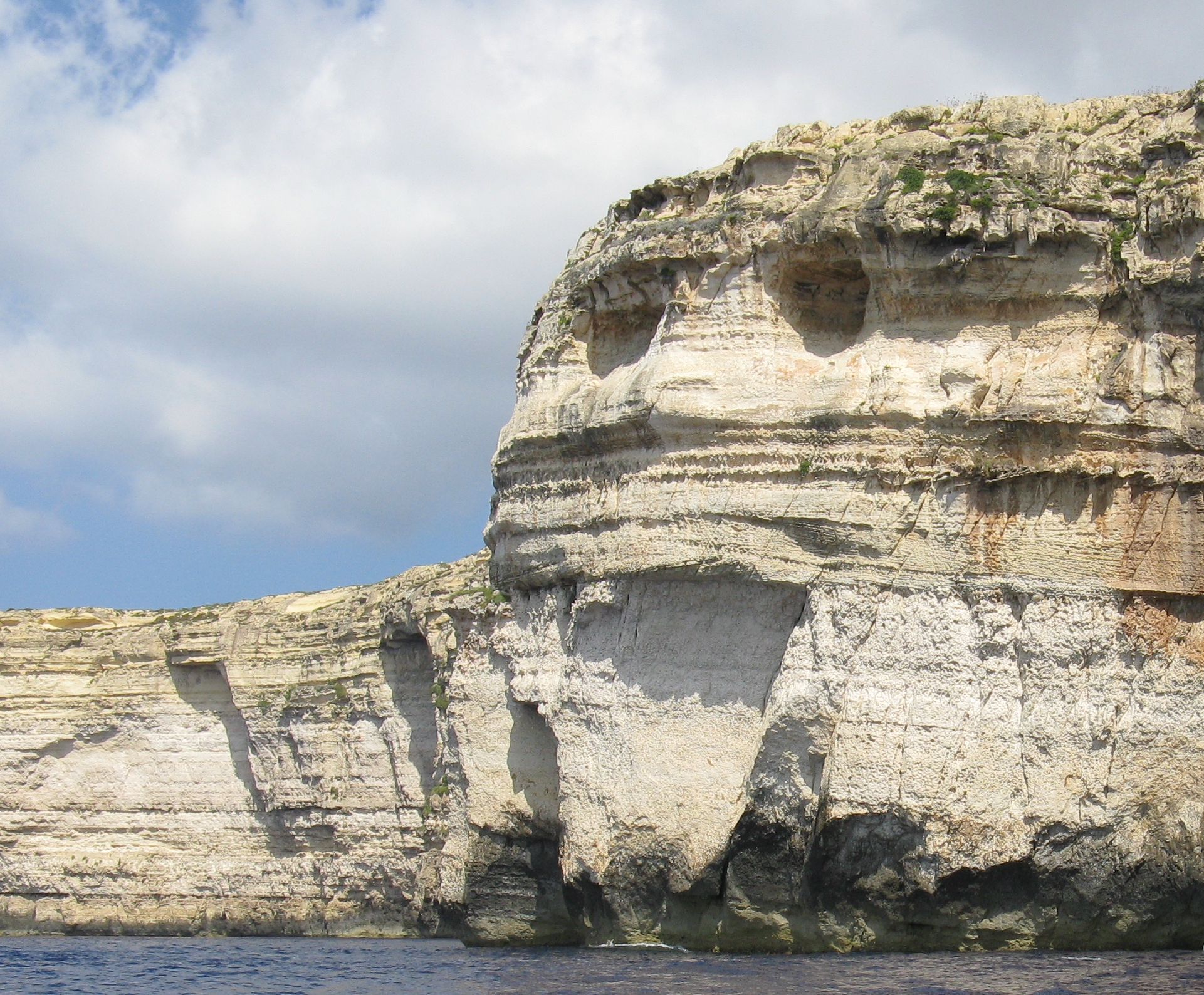
An example of pareidolia in the Rocks of Dwejra at Gozo, Malta, which looks like a face

Pareidolia (/ˌpærəˈdoʊliə/) is the tendency for perception to impose a meaningful interpretation on a nebulous stimulus, usually visual, so that one detects an object, pattern, or meaning where there is none. Pareidolia is a specific but common type of apophenia (the tendency to perceive meaningful connections between unrelated things or ideas).

Common examples include perceived images of animals, faces, or objects in cloud formations; seeing faces in inanimate objects; or lunar pareidolia like the Man in the Moon or the Moon rabbit. The concept of pareidolia may extend to include hidden messages in recorded music played in reverse or at higher- or lower-than-normal speeds, and hearing voices (mainly indistinct) or music in random noise, such as that produced by air conditioners or by fans. Face pareidolia has also been demonstrated in rhesus macaques.

== Etymology ==
The word derives from the Greek words pará (παρά, "beside, alongside, instead [of]") and the noun eídōlon (εἴδωλον, "image, form, shape").

Karl Ludwig Kahlbaum introduced the German term Pareidolie in his 1866 paper "Die Sinnesdelierien" ("On Delusion of the Senses"). When Kahlbaum's paper was reviewed the following year (1867) in The Journal of Mental Science, Volume 13, Pareidolie was translated into English as "pareidolia", and noted to be synonymous with the terms "...changing hallucination, partial hallucination, [and] perception of secondary images."

== Link to other conditions ==
Pareidolia correlates with age and is frequent among patients with Parkinson's disease and dementia with Lewy bodies.

Several case studies report intrusive pareidolia as a symptom presentation in obsessive compulsive disorder.

== Explanations ==
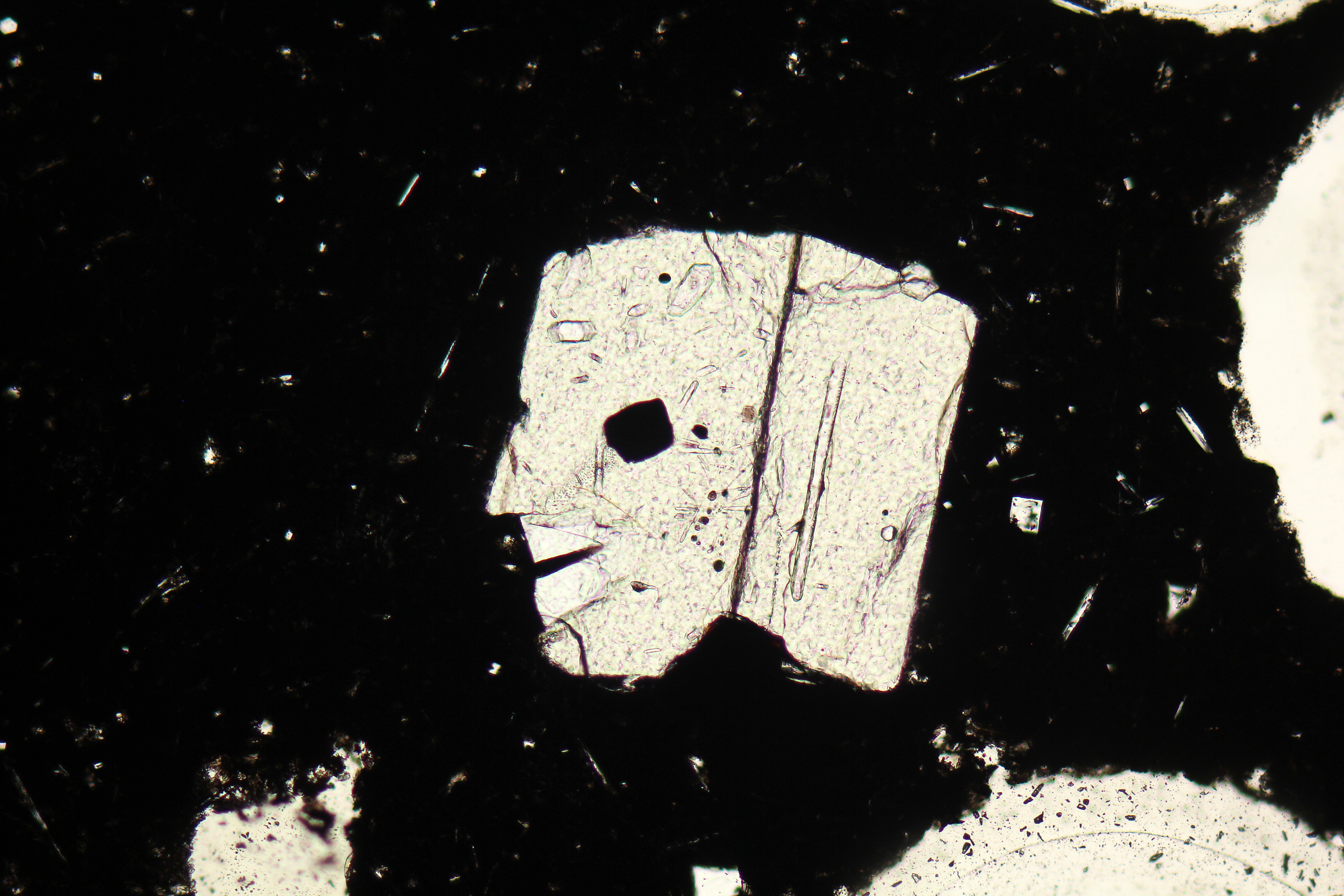
A pyroxene crystal in a piece of basalt that resembles a human face, facing to the left

Pareidolia can cause people to interpret random images, or patterns of light and shadow, as faces. A 2009 magnetoencephalography study found that objects perceived as faces evoke an early (165 ms) activation of the fusiform face area at a time and location similar to that evoked by faces, whereas other common objects do not evoke such activation. This activation is similar to a slightly faster time (130 ms) that is seen for images of real faces. The authors suggest that face perception evoked by face-like objects is a relatively early process, and not a late cognitive reinterpretation phenomenon.

A functional magnetic resonance imaging (fMRI) study in 2011 similarly showed that repeated presentation of novel visual shapes that were interpreted as meaningful led to decreased fMRI responses for real objects. These results indicate that the interpretation of ambiguous stimuli depends upon processes similar to those elicited by known objects.

Pareidolia was found to affect brain function and brain waves. In a 2022 study, EEG records show that responses in the frontal and occipitotemporal cortexes begin prior to when one recognizes faces and later, when they are not recognized. By displaying these proactive brain waves, scientists can then have a basis for data rather than relying on self-reported sightings.

These studies help to explain why people generally identify a few lines and a circle as a "face" so quickly and without hesitation. Cognitive processes are activated by the "face-like" object which alerts the observer to both the emotional state and identity of the subject, even before the conscious mind begins to process or even receive the information. A "stick figure face", despite its simplicity, can convey mood information, and be drawn to indicate emotions such as happiness or anger. This robust and subtle capability is hypothesized to be the result of natural selection favoring people most able to quickly identify the mental state, for example, of threatening people, thus providing the individual an opportunity to flee or attack preemptively. This ability, though highly specialized for the processing and recognition of human emotions, also functions to determine the demeanor of wildlife.

== Pareidolia and creative thinking ==
Pareidolia plays a significant role in creative cognition, enabling artists and viewers to perceive novel forms and meanings in ambiguous stimuli. Joanne Lee highlights that this phenomenon has been harnessed in artistic practices for centuries (Da Vinci for example). The phenomenon was particularly important to surrealism, where artists like Salvador Dali, influenced by André Breton, embraced pareidolic ambiguity to challenge rationalist perceptions and provoke new ways of seeing.

== Examples ==
=== Mimetoliths ===
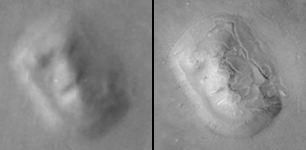
A more detailed photograph taken in different lighting in 2001 clarifies the "Face on Mars" to be a natural rock formation.

A mimetolithic pattern is a pattern created on rocks that may come to mimic recognizable forms through the random processes of formation, weathering and erosion. Many examples exist, from the Old Man of the Mountain (a face-like profile in a cliff) to Iztaccíhuatl, a range in Mexico whose name is Nahuatl for "White (like salt) woman", reflecting the four individual snow-capped peaks which depict the head, chest, knees and feet of a sleeping female when seen from east or west.

A well-known example is the Face on Mars, a rock formation on Mars that resembled a human face in certain satellite photos. Most mimetoliths are much larger than the subjects they resemble, such as a cliff profile that looks like a human face.

Picture jaspers exhibit combinations of patterns, such as banding from flow or depositional patterns (from water or wind), or dendritic or color variations, resulting in what appear to be miniature scenes on a cut section, which is then used for jewelry.

Chert nodules, concretions, or pebbles may in certain cases be mistakenly identified as skeletal remains, egg fossils, or other antiquities of organic origin by amateur enthusiasts.

In the late 1970s and early 1980s, Japanese researcher Chonosuke Okamura self-published a series of reports titled Original Report of the Okamura Fossil Laboratory, in which he described tiny inclusions in polished limestone from the Silurian period (425 mya) as being preserved fossil remains of tiny humans, gorillas, dogs, dragons, dinosaurs and other organisms, all of them only millimeters long, leading him to claim, "There have been no changes in the bodies of mankind since the Silurian period... except for a growth in stature from 3.5 mm to 1,700 mm." Okamura's research earned him an Ig Nobel Prize (a parody of the Nobel Prize) in biodiversity in 1996.

Some sources describe various mimetolithic features on Pluto, including a heart-shaped region.

=== Clouds ===
Seeing shapes in cloud patterns is another example of this phenomenon. Rogowitz and Voss (1990) showed a relationship between seeing shapes in cloud patterns and fractal dimension. They varied the fractal dimension of the boundary contour from 1.2 to 1.8, and found that the lower the fractal dimension, the more likely people were to report seeing nameable shapes of animals, faces, and fantasy creatures. From above, pareidolia may be perceived in satellite imagery of tropical cyclones. Notably hurricanes Matthew and Milton gained much attention for resembling a human face or skull when viewed from the side.

=== Mars canals ===
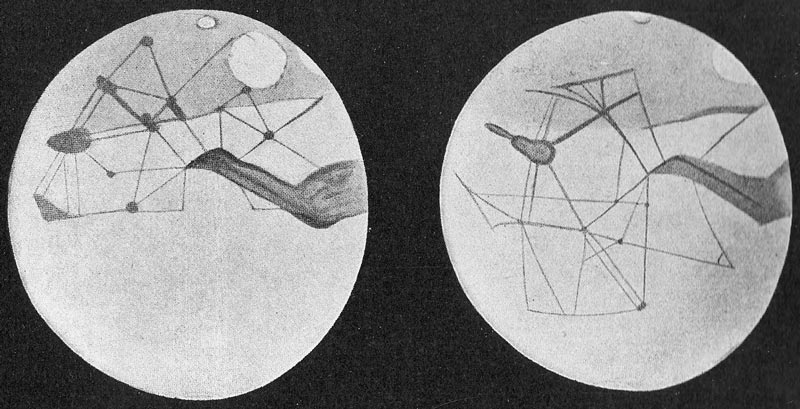
Map of Martian "canals" by Percival Lowell

A notable example of pareidolia occurred in 1877, when observers using telescopes to view the surface of Mars thought that they saw faint straight lines, which were then interpreted by some as canals. It was theorized that the canals were possibly created by sentient beings. This created a sensation. In the next few years better photographic techniques and stronger telescopes were developed and applied, which resulted in new images in which the faint lines disappeared, and the canal theory was debunked as an example of pareidolia.

=== Lunar surface ===
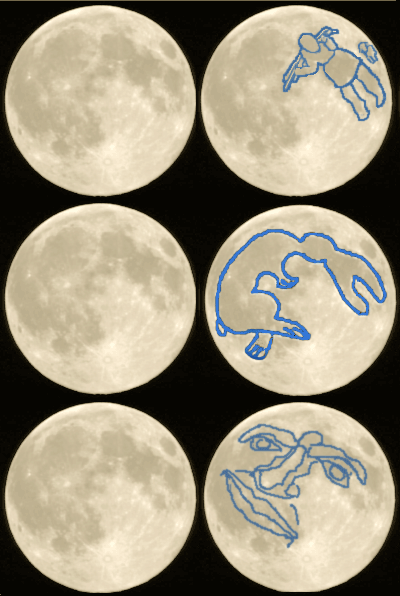
Pareidolias in the moon

Many cultures recognize pareidolic images in the disc of the full moon, including the human face known as the Man in the Moon in many Northern Hemisphere cultures and the Moon rabbit in East Asian and indigenous American cultures. Other cultures see a walking figure carrying a wide burden on their back, including in Germanic tradition, Haida mythology, and Latvian mythology.

=== Projective tests ===
The Rorschach inkblot test uses pareidolia in an attempt to gain insight into a person's mental state. The Rorschach is a projective test that elicits thoughts or feelings of respondents that are "projected" onto the ambiguous inkblot images. Rorschach inkblots have low-fractal-dimension boundary contours, which may elicit general shape-naming behaviors, serving as vehicles for projected meanings.

=== Banknotes ===
Owing to the way designs are engraved and printed, occurrences of pareidolia have occasionally been reported in banknotes.

One example is the 1954 Canadian Landscape Canadian dollar banknote series, known among collectors as the "Devil's Head" variety of the initial print runs. The obverse of the notes features what appears to be an exaggerated grinning face, formed from patterns in the hair of Queen Elizabeth II. The phenomenon generated enough attention for revised designs to be issued in 1956, which removed the effect.

=== Literature ===
Renaissance authors have shown a particular interest in pareidolia. In William Shakespeare's play Hamlet, for example, Prince Hamlet points at the sky and "demonstrates" his supposed madness in this exchange with Polonius:

Hamlet: "Do you see yonder cloud that's almost in the shape of a camel?"
Polonius: "By th'Mass and 'tis, like a camel indeed."
Hamlet: "Methinks it is a weasel."
Polonius: "It is backed like a weasel."
Hamlet: "Or a whale."
Polonius: "Very like a whale."

Nathaniel Hawthorne wrote a short story called "The Great Stone Face" in which a face seen in the side of a mountain (based on the real-life The Old Man of the Mountain) is revered by a village.

=== Art ===
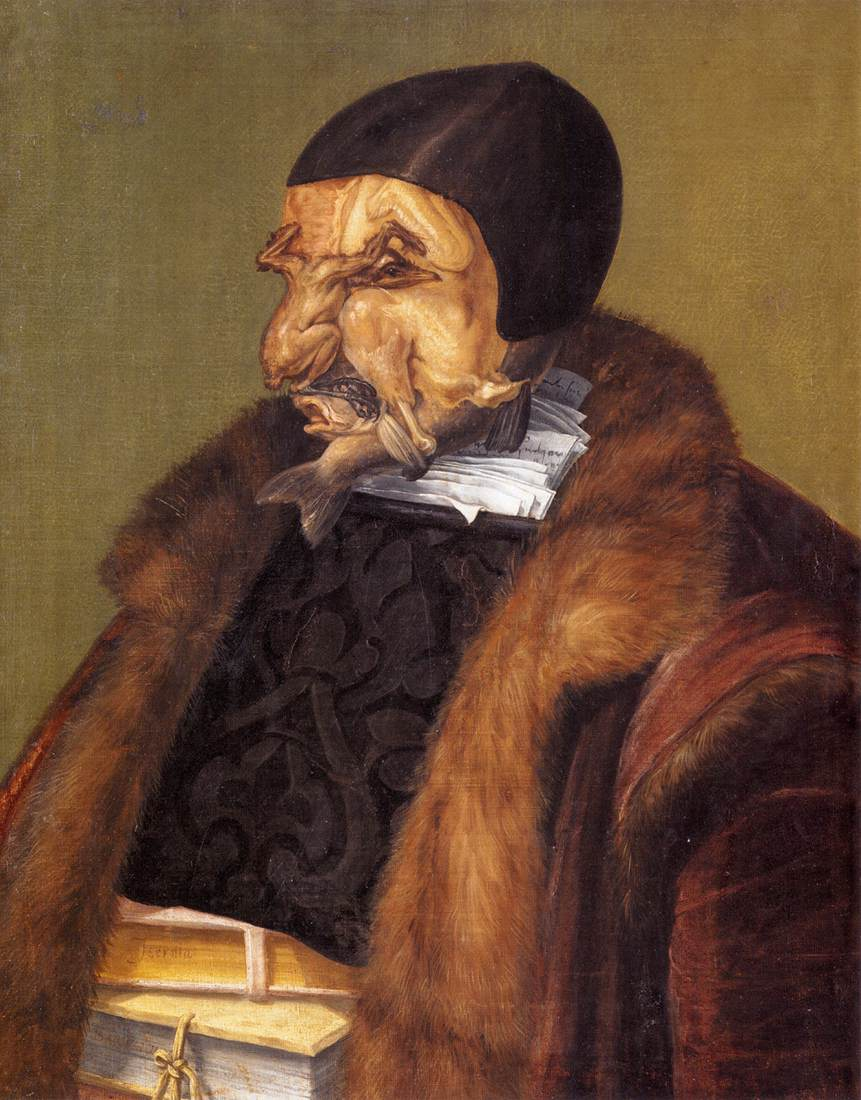
The Jurist by Giuseppe Arcimboldo, 1566. What appears to be his face is a collection of fish and poultry, while his body is a collection of books dressed in a coat.

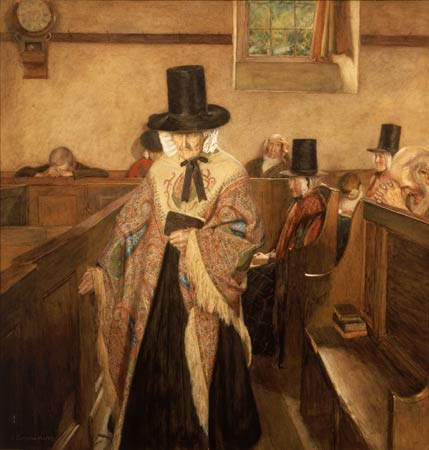
Salem by Sydney Curnow Vosper (1908), a painting notorious for the belief that the face of the devil was hidden in the main character's shawl

Renaissance artists often used pareidolia in paintings and drawings: Andrea Mantegna, Leonardo da Vinci, Giotto, Hans Holbein, Giuseppe Arcimboldo, and many more have shown images—often human faces—that due to pareidolia appear in objects or clouds.

In his notebooks, Leonardo da Vinci wrote of pareidolia as a device for painters, writing:

If you look at any walls spotted with various stains or with a mixture of different kinds of stones, if you are about to invent some scene you will be able to see in it a resemblance to various different landscapes adorned with mountains, rivers, rocks, trees, plains, wide valleys, and various groups of hills. You will also be able to see divers combats and figures in quick movement, and strange expressions of faces, and outlandish costumes, and an infinite number of things which you can then reduce into separate and well conceived forms.

Salem, a 1908 painting by Sydney Curnow Vosper, gained notoriety due to a rumour that it contained a hidden face, that of the devil. This led many commentators to visualize a demonic face depicted in the shawl of the main figure, despite the artist's denial that any faces had deliberately been painted into the shawl.

Surrealist artists such as Salvador Dalí would intentionally use pareidolia in their works, often in the form of a hidden face.

=== Architecture ===
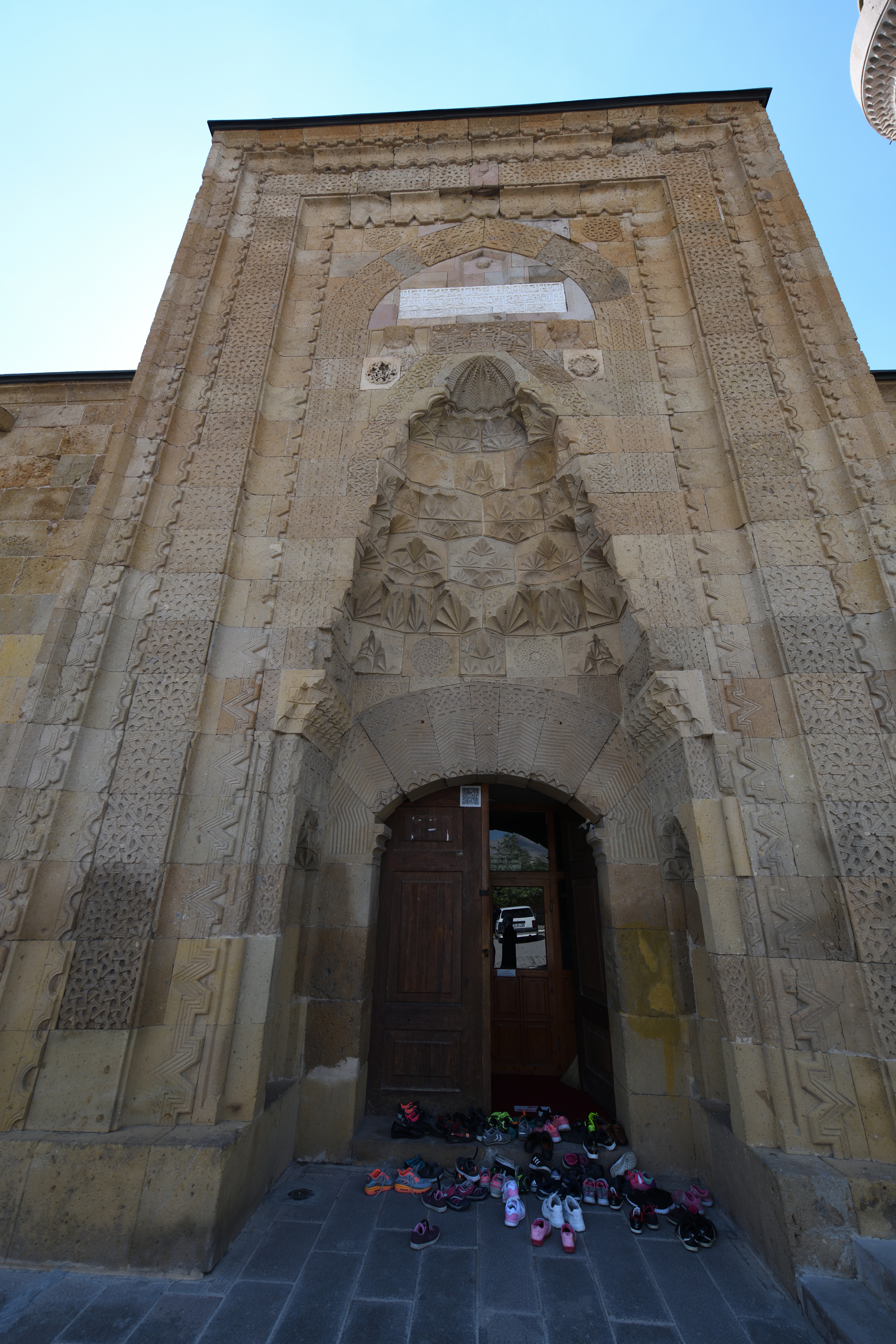
Illusory woman in the Niğde Alaaddin Mosque portal

Two 13th-century edifices in Turkey display architectural use of shadows of stone carvings at the entrance. Outright pictures are avoided in Islam but tessellations and calligraphic pictures were allowed, so designed "accidental" silhouettes of carved stone tessellations became a creative escape.

- Niğde Alaaddin Mosque in Niğde, Turkey (1223), with its "mukarnas" art where the shadows of three-dimensional ornamentation with stone masonry around the entrance form a chiaroscuro drawing of a woman's face with a crown and long hair appearing at a specific time, at some specific days of the year.
- Divriği Great Mosque and Hospital in Sivas, Turkey (1229), shows shadows of the three-dimensional ornaments of both entrances of the mosque part, to cast a giant shadow of a praying man that changes pose as the sun moves, as if to illustrate what the purpose of the building is. Another detail is the difference in the impressions of the clothing of the two shadow-men indicating two different styles, possibly to tell who is to enter through which door.

=== Religion ===
There have been many instances of perceptions of religious imagery and themes, especially the faces of religious figures, in ordinary phenomena. Many involve images of Jesus, the Virgin Mary, the word Allah, or other religious phenomena: in September 2007 in Singapore, for example, a callus on a tree resembled a monkey, leading believers to pay homage to the "Monkey god" (either Sun Wukong or Hanuman) in the monkey tree phenomenon.

Publicity surrounding sightings of religious figures and other surprising images in ordinary objects has spawned a market for such items on online auctions like eBay. One famous instance was a grilled cheese sandwich with the face of the Virgin Mary. This was parodied in the Glee episode "Grilled Cheesus".

During the September 11 attacks, television viewers supposedly saw the face of Satan in clouds of smoke billowing out of the World Trade Center after it was struck by the airplane. Another example of face recognition pareidolia originated in the fire at Notre Dame Cathedral, when a few observers claimed to see Jesus in the flames.

While attempting to validate the imprint of a crucified man on the Shroud of Turin as Jesus, a variety of objects have been described as being visible on the linen. These objects include a number of plant species, a coin with Roman numerals, and multiple insect species. In an experimental setting using a picture of plain linen cloth, participants who had been told that there could possibly be visible words in the cloth, collectively saw 2 religious words. Those told that the cloth was of some religious importance saw 12 religious words, and those who were also told that it was of religious importance, but also given suggestions of possible religious words, saw 37 religious words. The researchers posit that the reason the Shroud has been said to have so many different symbols and objects is because it was already deemed to have the imprint of Jesus prior to the search for symbols and other imprints in the cloth, and therefore it was simply pareidolia at work.

=== Computer vision ===
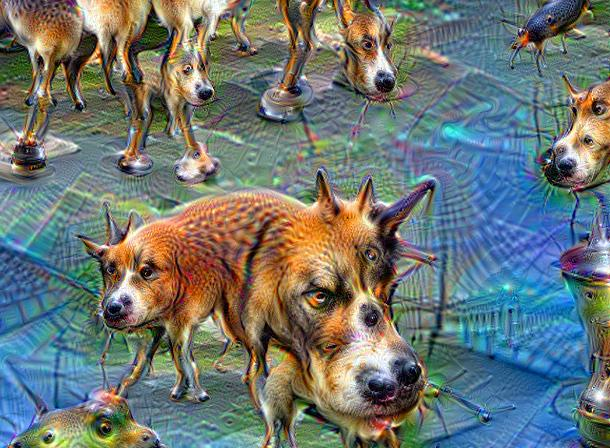
Given an image of jellyfish swimming, the DeepDream program can be encouraged to "see" dogs.

Pareidolia can occur in computer vision, specifically in image recognition programs, in which vague clues can spuriously detect images or features. In the case of an artificial neural network, higher-level features correspond to more recognizable features, and enhancing these features brings out what the computer sees. These examples of pareidolia reflect the training set of images that the network has "seen" previously.

Striking visuals can be produced in this way, notably in the DeepDream software, which falsely detects and then exaggerates features such as eyes and faces in any image. The features can be further exaggerated by creating a feedback loop where the output is used as the input for the network. (The adjacent image was created by iterating the loop 50 times.) Additionally the output can be modified such as slightly zooming in to create an animation of the images perspective flying through the surrealistic imagery.

=== Auditory ===
In 1971 Konstantīns Raudive wrote Breakthrough, detailing what he believed was the discovery of electronic voice phenomena (EVP). EVP has been described as auditory pareidolia. Allegations of backmasking in popular music, in which a listener claims a message has been recorded backward onto a track meant to be played forward, have also been described as auditory pareidolia. In 1995, the psychologist Diana Deutsch invented an algorithm for producing phantom words and phrases with the sounds coming from two stereo loudspeakers, one to the listener's left and the other to his right, producing a phase offset in time between the speakers. After listening for a while, phantom words and phrases suddenly emerge, and these often appear to reflect what is on the listener's mind.

== Deliberate practical use ==
=== Medical education, radiology images ===
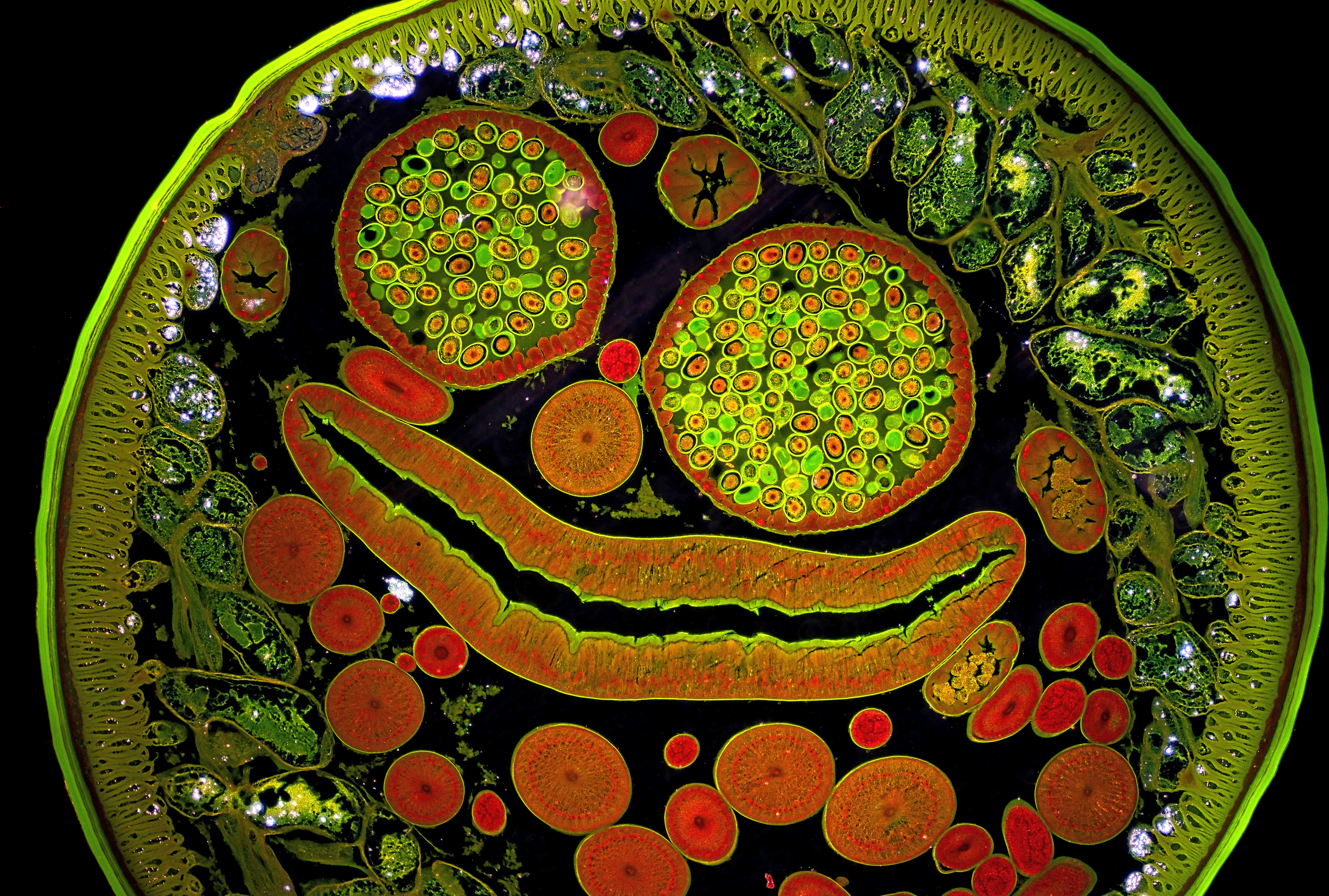
Cross-section of nematode worm Ascaris

Medical educators sometimes teach medical students and resident physicians (doctors in training) to use pareidolia and patternicity to learn to recognize human anatomy on radiology imaging studies.

Examples include assessing radiographs (X-ray images) of the human vertebral spine. Patrick Foye, M.D., professor of physical medicine and rehabilitation at Rutgers University, New Jersey Medical School, has written that pareidolia is used to teach medical trainees to assess for spinal fractures and spinal malignancies (cancers). When viewing spinal radiographs, normal bony anatomic structures resemble the face of an owl. (The spinal pedicles resemble an owl's eyes and the spinous process resembles an owl's beak.) But when cancer erodes the bony spinal pedicle, the radiographic appearance changes such that now that eye of the owl seems missing or closed, which is called the "winking owl sign". Another common pattern is a "Scottie dog sign" on a spinal X-ray.

In 2021, Foye again published in the medical literature on this topic, in a medical journal article called "Baby Yoda: Pareidolia and Patternicity in Sacral MRI and CT Scans". Here, he introduced a novel way of visualizing the sacrum when viewing MRI magnetic resonance imaging and CT scans (computed tomography scans). He noted that in certain image slices the human sacral anatomy resembles the face of "Baby Yoda" (also called Grogu), a fictional character from the television show The Mandalorian. Sacral openings for exiting nerves (sacral foramina) resemble Baby Yoda's eyes, while the sacral canal resembles Baby Yoda's mouth.

=== In popular culture ===
Many Internet memes about the online game Among Us exploit pareidolia, by showing everyday items (in this case, a fire alarm) that look similar to characters from the game.

In January 2017, an anonymous user placed an eBay auction of a Cheeto that looked like the gorilla Harambe. Bidding began at US$11.99, but the Cheeto was eventually sold for US$99,000.

Starting from 2021, an Internet meme emerged around the online game Among Us, where users presented everyday items such as dogs, statues, garbage cans, big toes, and pictures of the Boomerang Nebula that looked like the game's "crewmate" protagonists. In May 2021, an eBay user named Tav listed a Chicken McNugget shaped like a crewmate from Among Us for online auction. The Chicken McNugget was sold for US$99,997 to an anonymous buyer.

== Related phenomena ==
A shadow person (also known as a shadow figure, shadow being or black mass) is often attributed to pareidolia. It is the perception of a patch of shadow as a living, humanoid figure, particularly as interpreted by believers in the paranormal or supernatural as the presence of a spirit or other entity.

Pareidolia is also what some skeptics believe causes people to believe that they have seen ghosts.

== See also ==
- Clustering illusion – Erroneously seeing patterns in randomness
- Conspiracy theory – Attributing events to an improbable conspiracy (another example of apophenia)
- Eigenface – Set of eigenvectors used in the computer vision problem of human face recognition
- Hitler teapot – Kettle perceived to resemble Adolf Hitler
- Madonna of the Toast – 2007 book about pareidolia
- Mondegreen – Misinterpretation of a spoken phrase
- Optical illusion – Visually perceived images that differ from objective reality
- Perceptions of religious imagery in natural phenomena
- Signal-to-noise ratio – Ratio of the desired signal to the background noise
