= Madonna of the Toast =

2007 book about pareidolia

- Author: Buzz Poule
- Publisher: Mark Batty
- Publication date: 2007
- Pages: 95
- ISBN: 9780977282777

Madonna of the Toast is a book by American author Buzz Poole. It was published in March 2007 by Mark Batty Publisher and is the first book to document the common occurrence of religious and secular icons appearing in unexpected places – such as the Virgin Mary on a grilled cheese sandwich, Mickey Mouse on the side of a cow, or Mother Teresa on a cinnamon bun – a phenomenon known as pareidolia.

Author Buzz Poole writes:

Whether on the level of sacrosanct devotion or pop culture kitsch, these forms become as relevant as the world’s finest art because they compel people to react; the objects in this book, emblazoned with faces and symbols recognized the world over, have been appraised at stunningly high sums, been toured around the globe and have inspired people to travel, pray and steal.

Madonna of the Toast has been featured in the Miami Herald, Miami New Times, Nashville Scene and San Francisco Chronicle, as well as on CBC Radio and WFMU in New York. It was named one of 2007’s Best Underground books by the New Statesman.
