= Niğde Alaaddin Mosque =

Historical mosque in Niğde, Turkey

- Alâeddin Camii
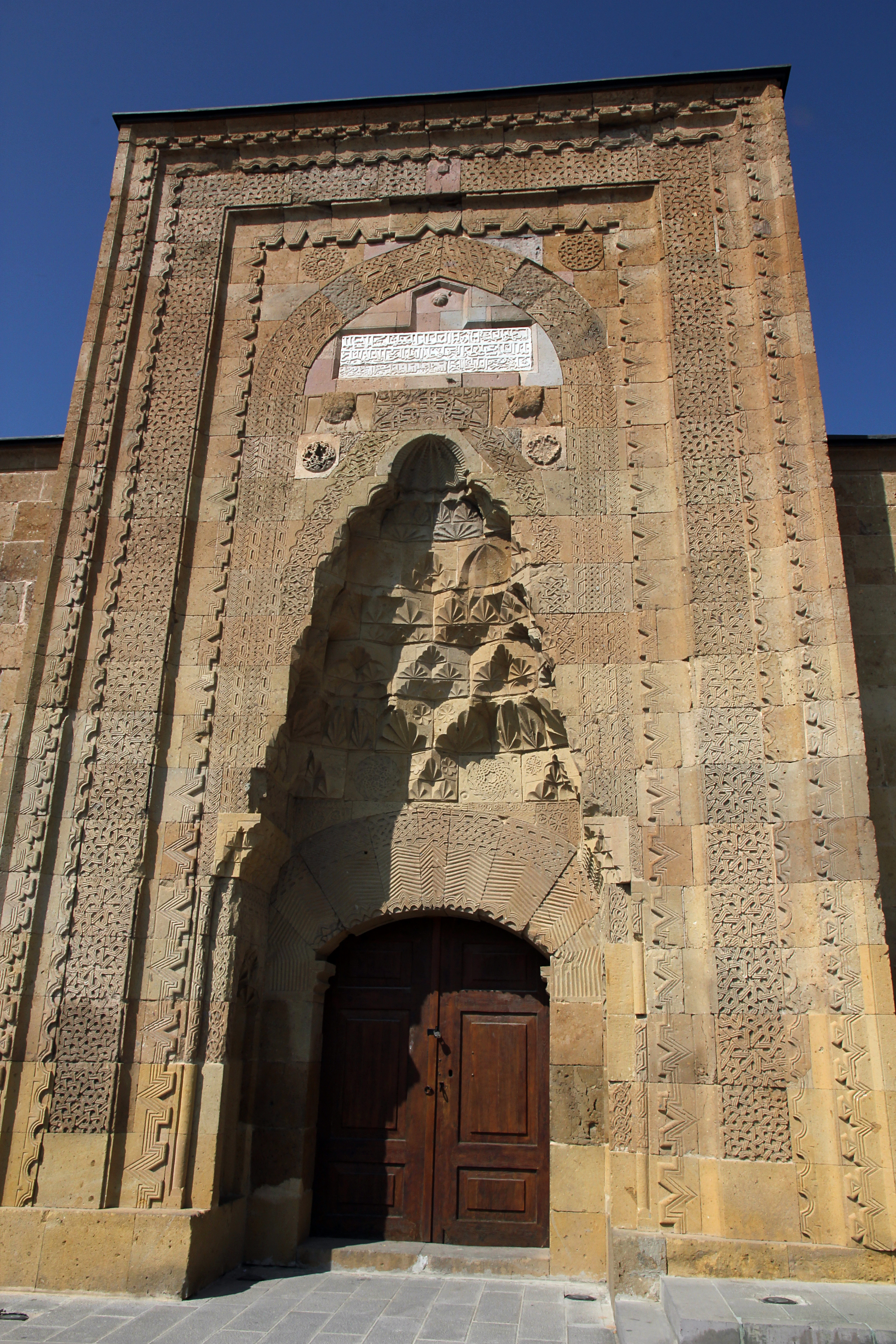

- Location within Turkey

Religion
- Affiliation: Islam
- District: Niğde
- Region: Central Anatolia
- Rite: Sunni Islam
- Status: Active

Location
- Location: Kale mahallesi, Niğde
- Coordinates: 37°57′59″N 34°40′44″E

Architecture
- Architect: Sıddık
- Type: Mosque
- Completed: 1223

Specifications
- Dome: 3
- Minaret: 1
- Materials: Cut stone

Niğde Alaaddin Mosque is a historic mosque in Niğde, Turkey.

The mosque is in the historical castle of Niğde at 37°57′59″N 34°40′44″E. The mosque was constructed in 1223 during the reign of Keyqubad I (r. 1220–1237) of the Sultanate of Rum (precursor of the Ottoman Empire). It was commissioned by Ziynettin Beşare, the local governor of Niğde on behalf of the sultan. The chief architect of the mosque was Sıddık, the son of Mahmut. His brother Gazi was his assistant.

The building material is cut stone. There are two portals: the one on the east side is monumental. The second gate is in the north side. There are three domes in the southern part of the mosque. The minaret is located in the northeastern corner of the square building.

According to local legend, the shape of the muqarnas-carved eastern portal casts a shadow that resembles the silhouette of a crowned girl, ostensibly the founder's daughter with whom the stonemason who built the mosque fell in love.
