= Niğde =

- Municipality
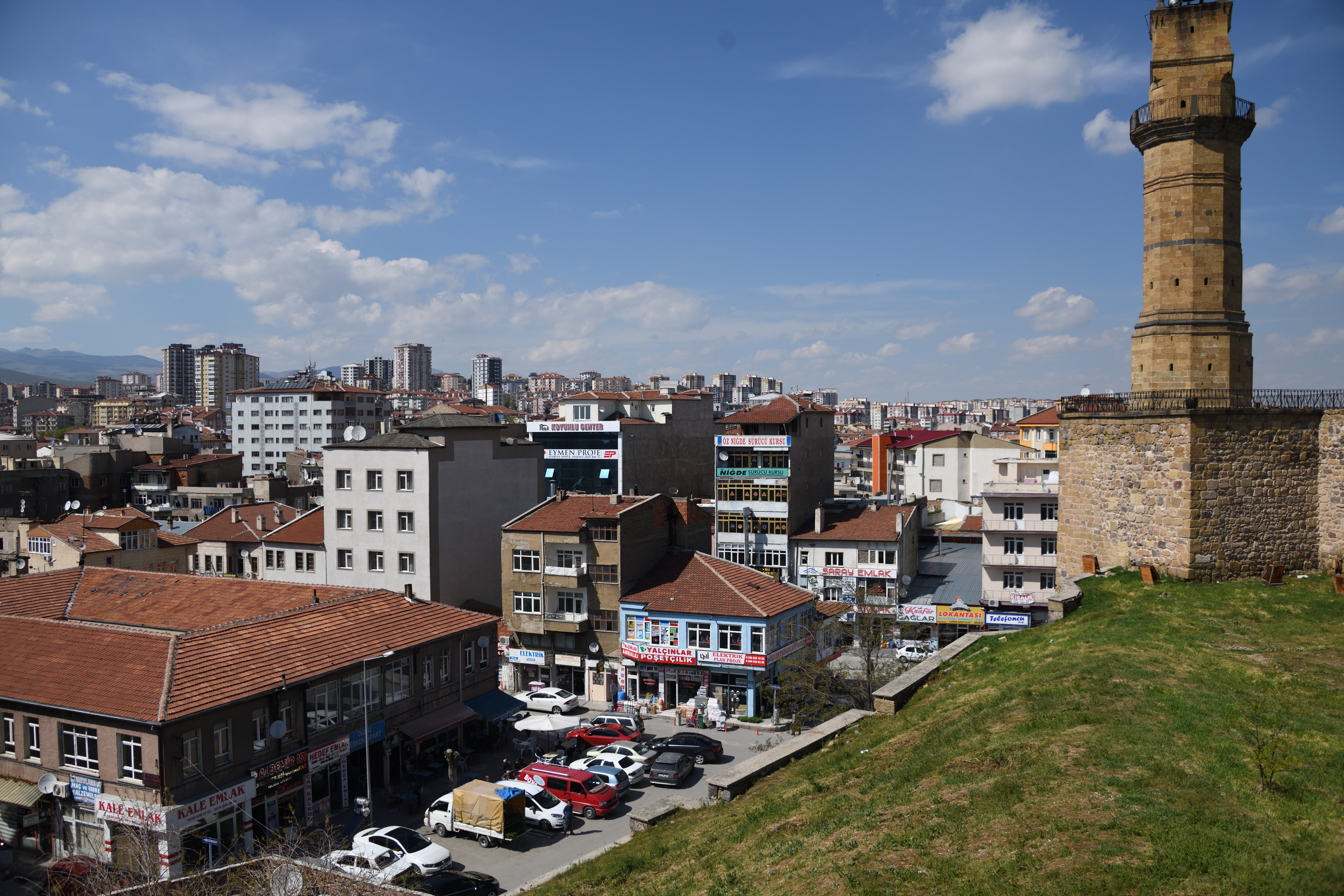
- View from Niğde Castle

- Location within Turkey Location within Turkey Central Anatolia
- Coordinates: 37°58′00″N 34°40′45″E
- Country: Turkey
- Province: Niğde
- District: Niğde

Government
  - Mayor: Emrah Özdemir (AK Party)
- Elevation: 1,276 m (4,186 ft)
- Population (2022): 170,511
- Time zone: UTC+3 (TRT)
- Postal code: 51660
- Area code: 0388
- Website: www.nigde.bel.tr

Niğde (Turkish pronunciation: [ni:de]) is a city and is located in the Central Anatolia region of Turkey. It is the seat of Niğde Province and Niğde District. Its population is 170,511 (2022). It lies at an elevation of 1,276 m (4,186 ft).

The city is small with plenty of green space and gardens around the houses. Its people generally tend to be religious and conservative.

Medieval monuments are scattered about the centre of the town, especially around the market place.

The nearest airport is Nevşehir Kapadokya Airport (NAV) which is 90.6 km (50.6 miles) away.

== History ==
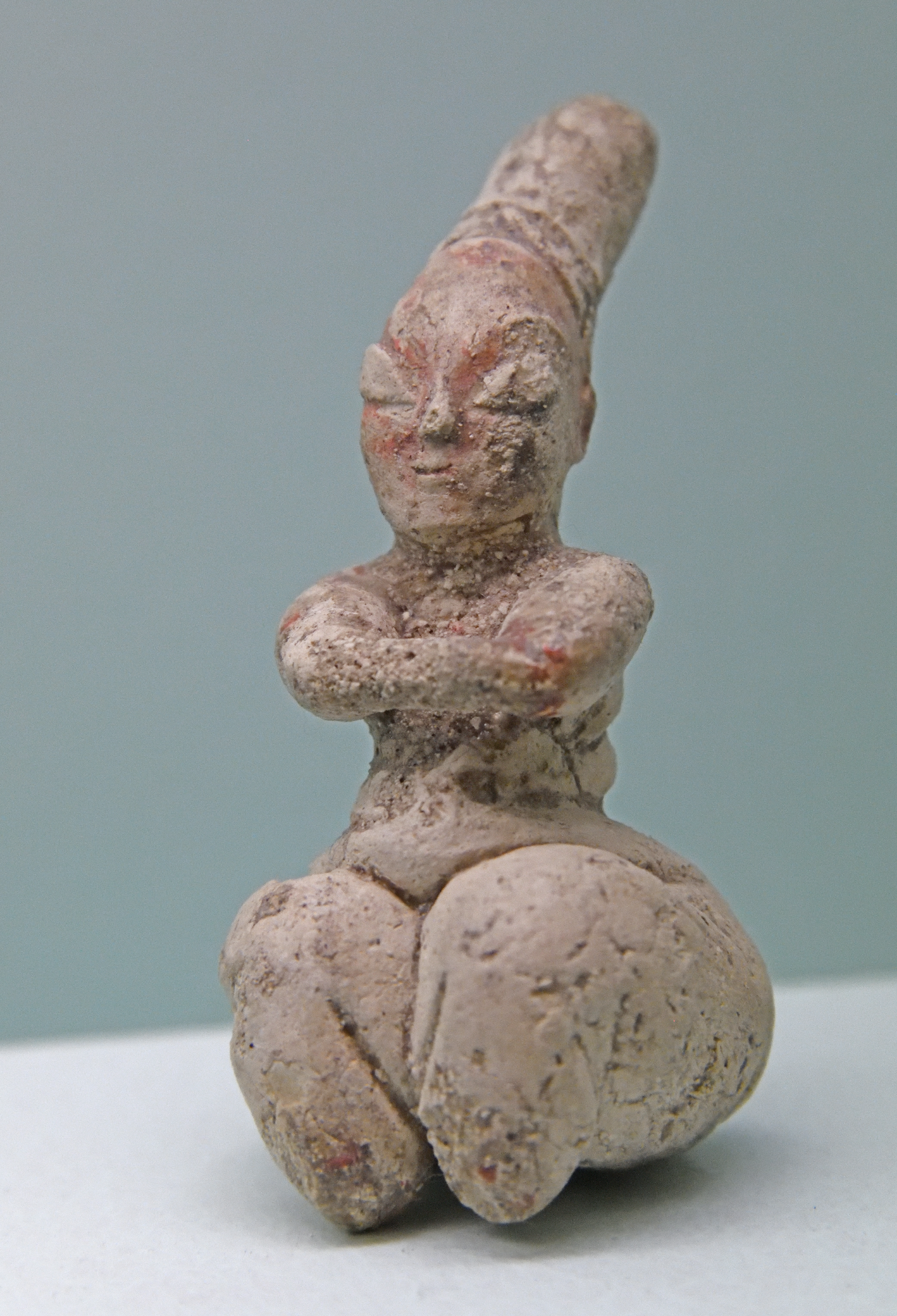
Statue from Köşk Höyük in the Niğde Archaeological Museum.

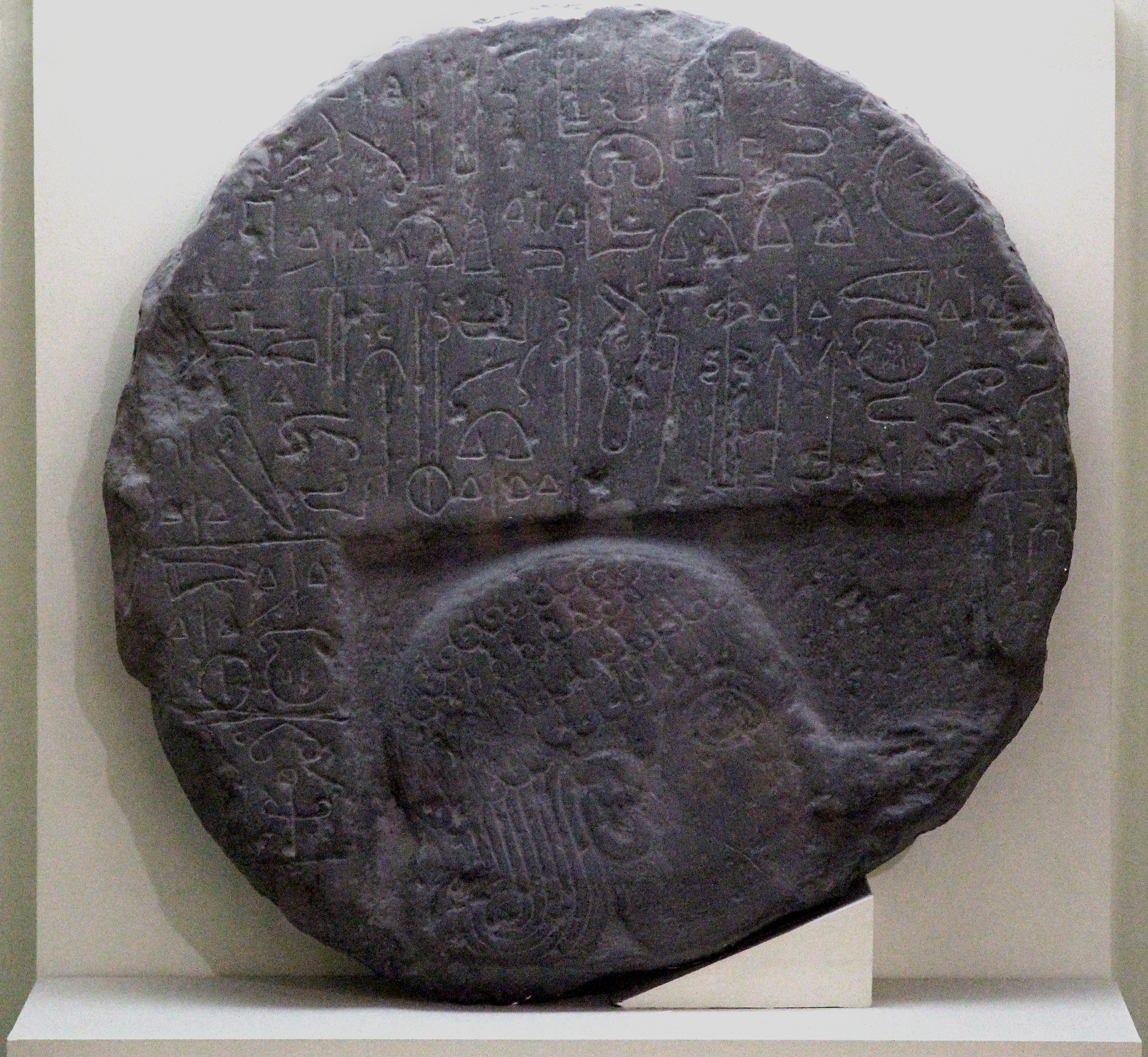
Late Hittite stele fragment from Andaval, plaster cast in the Niğde Archaeological Museum.

Niğde is located near a number of ancient trade routes, particularly the road from Kayseri (ancient Caesarea Mazaca) to the Cilician Gates and thence to the Mediterranean coast. The area has been settled by Hittites, Assyrians, Greeks, Armenians, Romans, Byzantines and Turks.

=== Middle Ages ===
In the early Middle Ages, it was known as Magida (Greek: Μαγίδα), and was settled by the remaining inhabitants of nearby Tyana after it fell to the Arabs in 708/709.

By the early 13th century Niğde was one of the largest cities in Anatolia. After the fall of the Sultanate of Rûm (of which it had been one of the principal cities), Niğde was captured by Anatolian beyliks such as the Karaman Beylik and Eretna Beylik. Passing through in the 14th century, the explorer Ibn Battuta reported it ruinous. It did not pass into Ottoman hands until 1467.

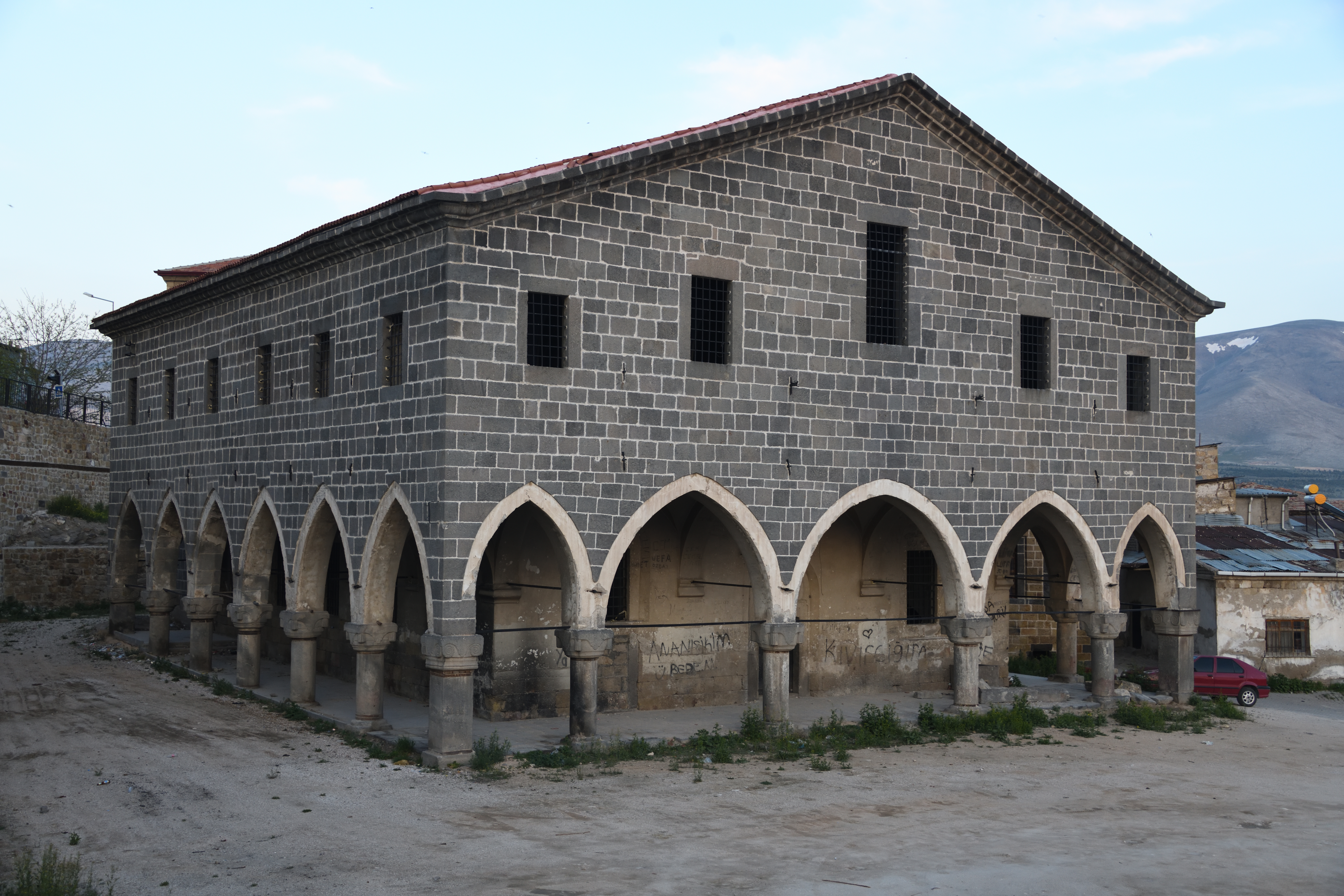
Prodromos Church in Niğde Province.

According to the Ottoman population statistics of 1914, the sanjak of Niğde, then part of the Konya Vilayet, had a total population of 291,117, consisting of 227,100 Muslims, 58,312 Greeks, 4,935 Armenians and 769 Protestants. The demographics of the town of Niğde, which was part of the Niğde sanjak, consisted of 52.754 Muslims, 26.156 Greeks, 1.149 Armenians and 137 Protestants. Most of the Christian population of late 19th-century Niğde lived in the Eski Saray Mahallesi near the Sungur Bey Mosque where the remains of two large stone churches still survive in a neglected condition.

=== Republican era ===
More recent immigrants include Turks from Bulgaria and other Balkan countries, who were settled here by the Turkish authorities in the 1950s and 1960s.

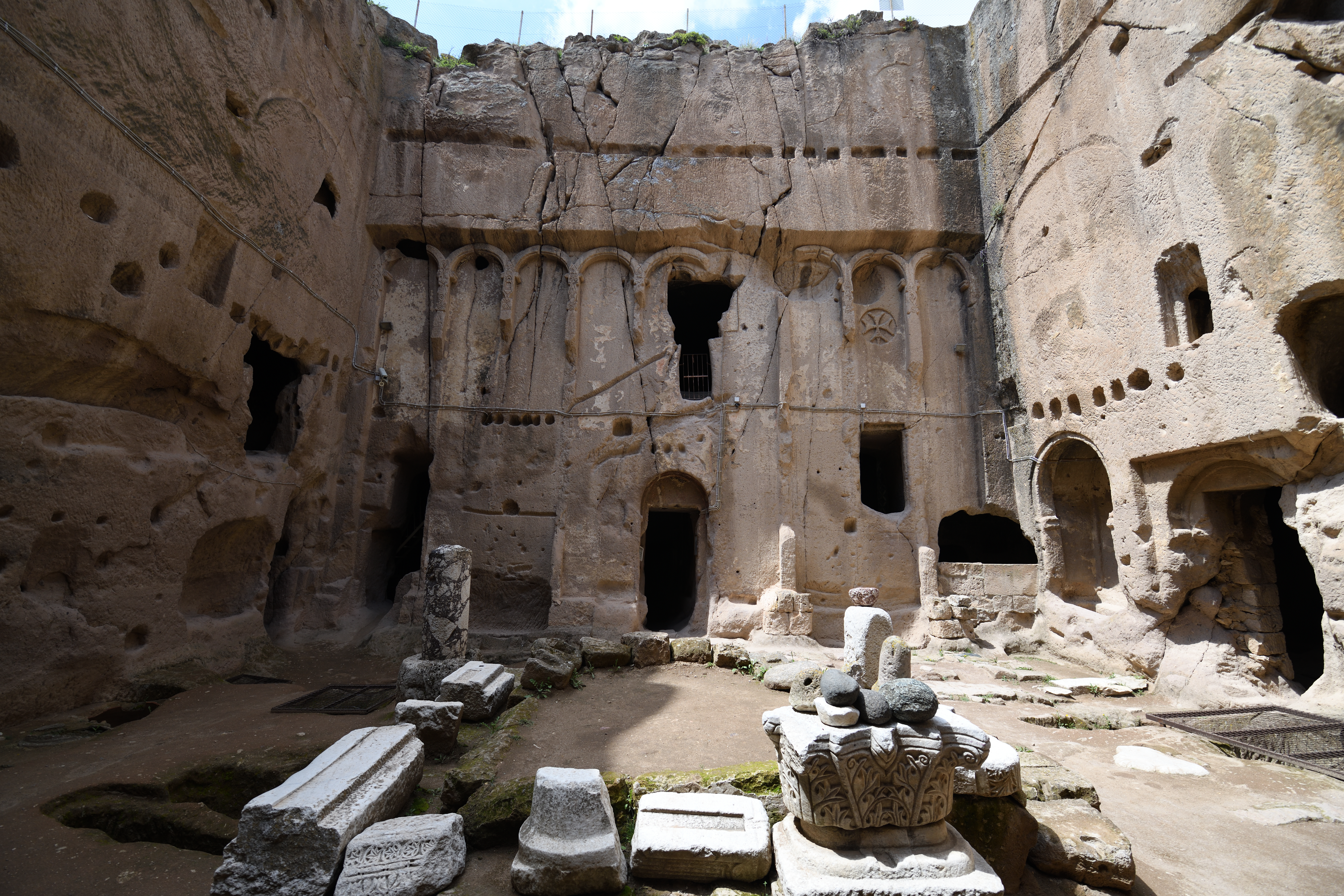
Eski Gümüşler Monastery in Niğde

The opening of Niğde University in 1992 started to bring more cultural and social amenities to what was at the time essentially a large town with a rather rural feel to it.

== Geography ==
Niğde consists of 26 neighbourhoods: Alaaddin, Ahipaşa, A.Kayabaşı, Balhasan, Burhan, Çayır, Dere, Efendibey, Esenbey, Eskisaray, İlhanlı, Kale, Nar, Saruhan, Selçuk, Sırali, Sungur, Ş.Süleyman, Şahinali, Şehitler, Yenice, Y.Kayabaşı, İnönü, Fertek, Kumluca and Hamamlı.

=== Climate ===
Niğde has a cold semi-arid climate (Köppen: BSk, Trewartha: BS), bordering on a temperate continental climate (Köppen: Dsa, Trewartha: Dc). Niğde has hot, dry summers and cold, snowy winters.

Climate data for Niğde (1991–2020, extremes 1935–2023)
Month	Jan	Feb	Mar	Apr	May	Jun	Jul	Aug	Sep	Oct	Nov	Dec	Year
Record high °C (°F)	19.9 (67.8)	20.5 (68.9)	26.4 (79.5)	30.8 (87.4)	33.0 (91.4)	35.0 (95.0)	38.5 (101.3)	39.7 (103.5)	37.3 (99.1)	32.0 (89.6)	25.0 (77.0)	21.2 (70.2)	39.7 (103.5)
Mean daily maximum °C (°F)	5.3 (41.5)	7.0 (44.6)	11.9 (53.4)	17.2 (63.0)	22.2 (72.0)	26.6 (79.9)	30.2 (86.4)	30.3 (86.5)	26.3 (79.3)	20.4 (68.7)	13.2 (55.8)	7.4 (45.3)	18.2 (64.8)
Daily mean °C (°F)	0.0 (32.0)	1.4 (34.5)	6.0 (42.8)	11.0 (51.8)	15.6 (60.1)	19.8 (67.6)	23.2 (73.8)	23.1 (73.6)	18.8 (65.8)	13.3 (55.9)	6.5 (43.7)	2.0 (35.6)	11.7 (53.1)
Mean daily minimum °C (°F)	−4.1 (24.6)	−3.2 (26.2)	0.8 (33.4)	5.0 (41.0)	9.1 (48.4)	12.9 (55.2)	15.8 (60.4)	15.6 (60.1)	11.4 (52.5)	7.0 (44.6)	1.3 (34.3)	−2.2 (28.0)	5.8 (42.4)
Record low °C (°F)	−25.6 (−14.1)	−24.2 (−11.6)	−23.9 (−11.0)	−6.9 (19.6)	−2.6 (27.3)	3.5 (38.3)	6.6 (43.9)	6.5 (43.7)	−0.7 (30.7)	−6.2 (20.8)	−19.5 (−3.1)	−24.0 (−11.2)	−25.6 (−14.1)
Average precipitation mm (inches)	34.3 (1.35)	32.0 (1.26)	38.8 (1.53)	41.1 (1.62)	43.4 (1.71)	29.2 (1.15)	5.5 (0.22)	7.7 (0.30)	12.4 (0.49)	30.3 (1.19)	32.7 (1.29)	42.5 (1.67)	349.9 (13.78)
Average precipitation days	10.27	9.87	10.67	11.30	12.17	7.47	2.03	1.87	3.10	6.47	6.97	10.20	92.39
Average snowy days	6.6	5.4	4.3	1.0	0.1	0	0	0	0	0.1	1.2	4.1	22.8
Average relative humidity (%)	73.3	69.0	61.8	56.6	55.7	50.3	43.0	43.8	47.6	57.8	66.3	73.2	58.2
Mean monthly sunshine hours	116.5	139.8	177.9	207.3	253.0	294.8	343.7	334.9	287.0	224.3	165.3	113.3	2,657.7
Mean daily sunshine hours	3.8	5.0	5.7	6.9	8.2	9.8	11.1	10.8	9.6	7.2	5.5	3.6	7.3
Source 1: Turkish State Meteorological Service
Source 2: NOAA (humidity, sun 1991-2020), Meteomanz(snowy days 2000-2024)

=== Geology ===
The town is located between the volcanic Melandiz Mountains, which include the Mount Hasan Stratovolcano near the city of Aksaray to the north, and the Niğde Massif to the south-southeast. The massif is a metamorphic rock dome that contains abandoned antimony and iron mines. Several marble quarries are currently being used to dig out the pure white crystalline marble of the massif.

== Sightseeing ==
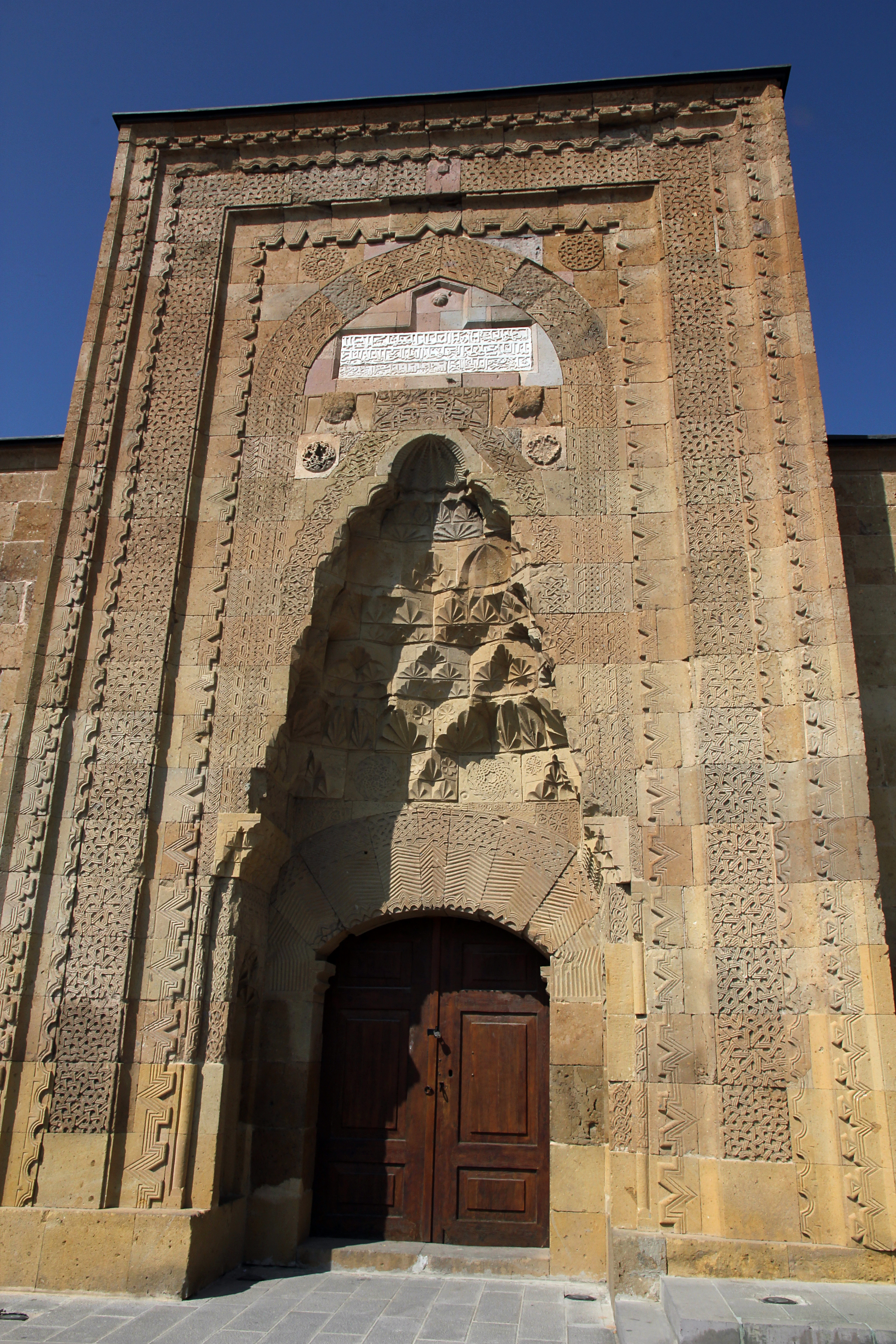
Portal of Alaaddin Mosque, Niğde

=== In town ===
- Sungur Bey Mosque, a unique early 14th-century mosque in the town centre which combines elements of Selçuk and Gothic architecture, including quadripartite vaulting and a rose window. Standing on a platform above the market place, it was recently restored.
- Alaaddin Mosque, a 13th-century mosque whose portal is decorated with muqarnas. Shadows cast on the stone masonry around the entrance at a specific time on specific days of the year are said to form an image of a woman's face with a crown and long hair (Islam forbade human imagery but tessellations and calligraphic pictures were allowed, so "accidental" silhouettes became a creative escape).
- Hudavend Hatun Türbe, the finest of several Selçuk tombs in the centre of Niğde, dates back to the early 14th century.
- Ak Medrese (White Medrese), built in 1409 during the years when the Karamanoğlu dynasty ruled Niğde.
- Niğde Castle (Niğde Kalesi) looms above the town, its location made obvious by a clocktower (1902) inside it. It dates back in part to Selçuk times. Its interior is now a public park.
- Niğde Archaeological Museum, one of whose star attractions is the Niğde Stele which was recovered from the Dışarı Mosque where it was being used as a door lintel.

=== Around town ===
- Eski Gümüşler Monastery, a rock-cut frescoed monastery built by the Byzantines and containing unique paintings of stories from Aesop's Fables. It was only rediscovered in 1963
- Kemerhisar, the site of ancient Tyana, especially noted for a lengthy surviving stretch of Roman aqueduct.
- Aladağlar and Bolkar Mountains, which are popular with mountaineers and trekkers.
- Çiniligöl
- Çiftehan thermal springs

== Gallery ==
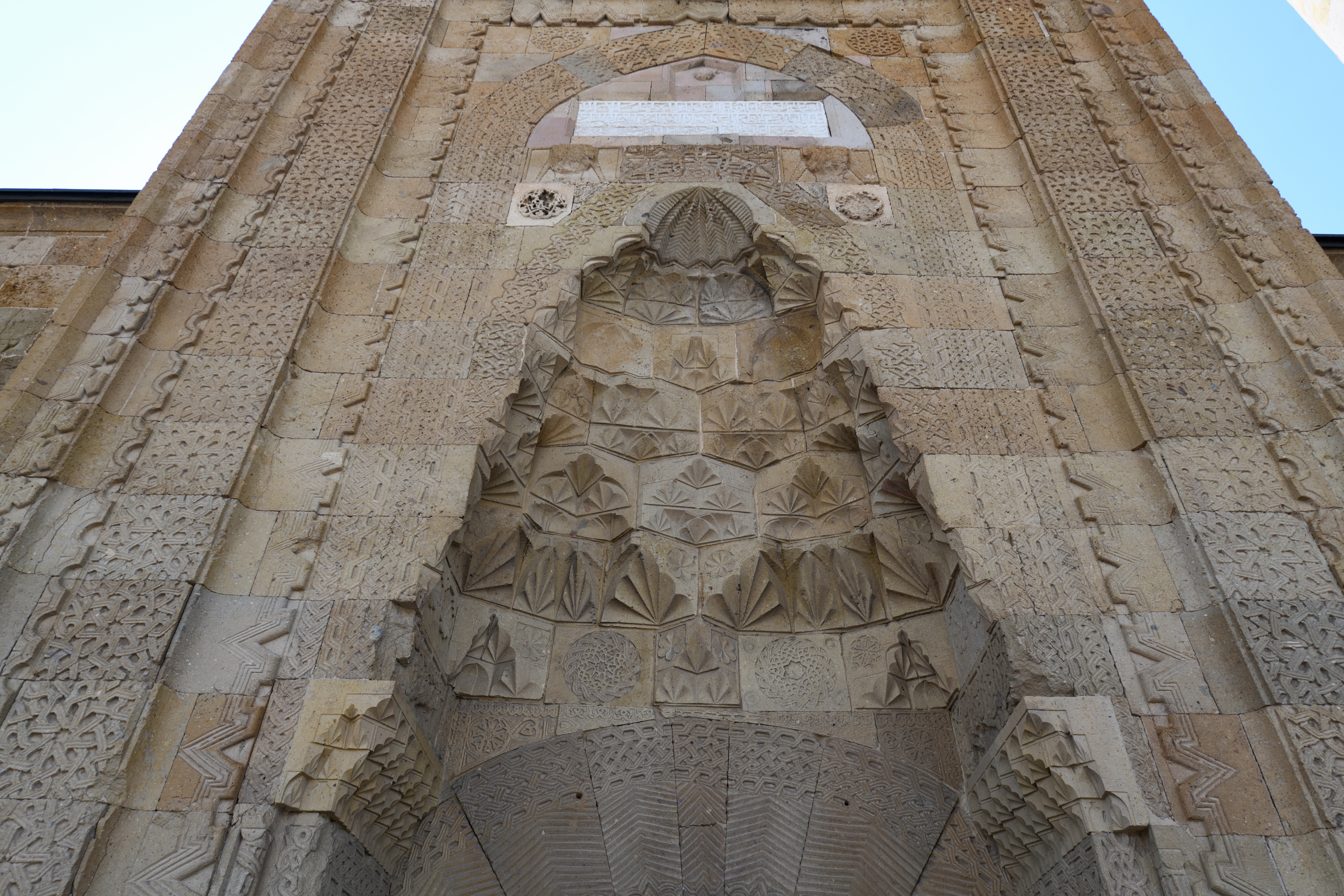
Portal of Alaadin Mosque, Niğde

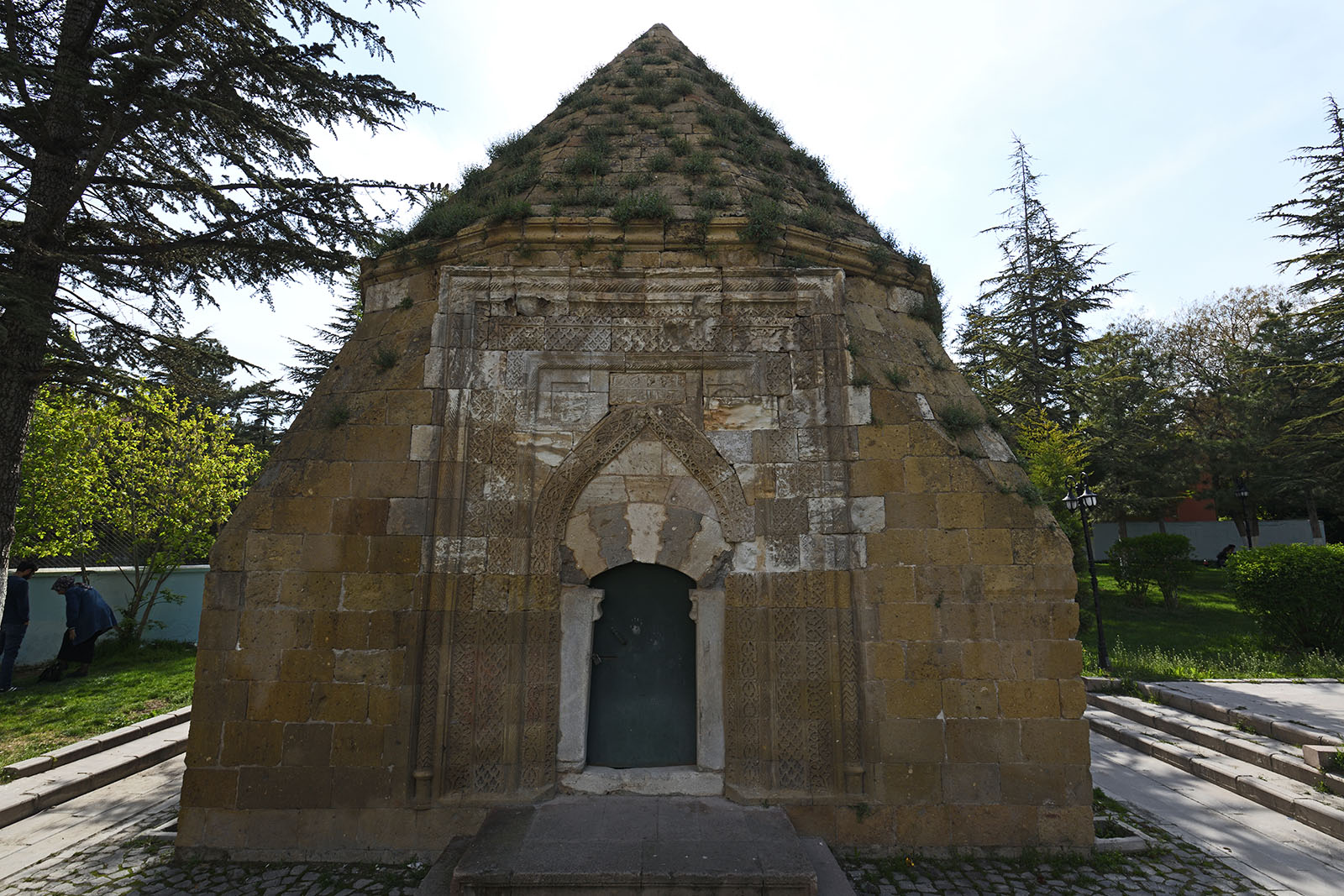
Gündoğdü türbe (tomb), Niğde

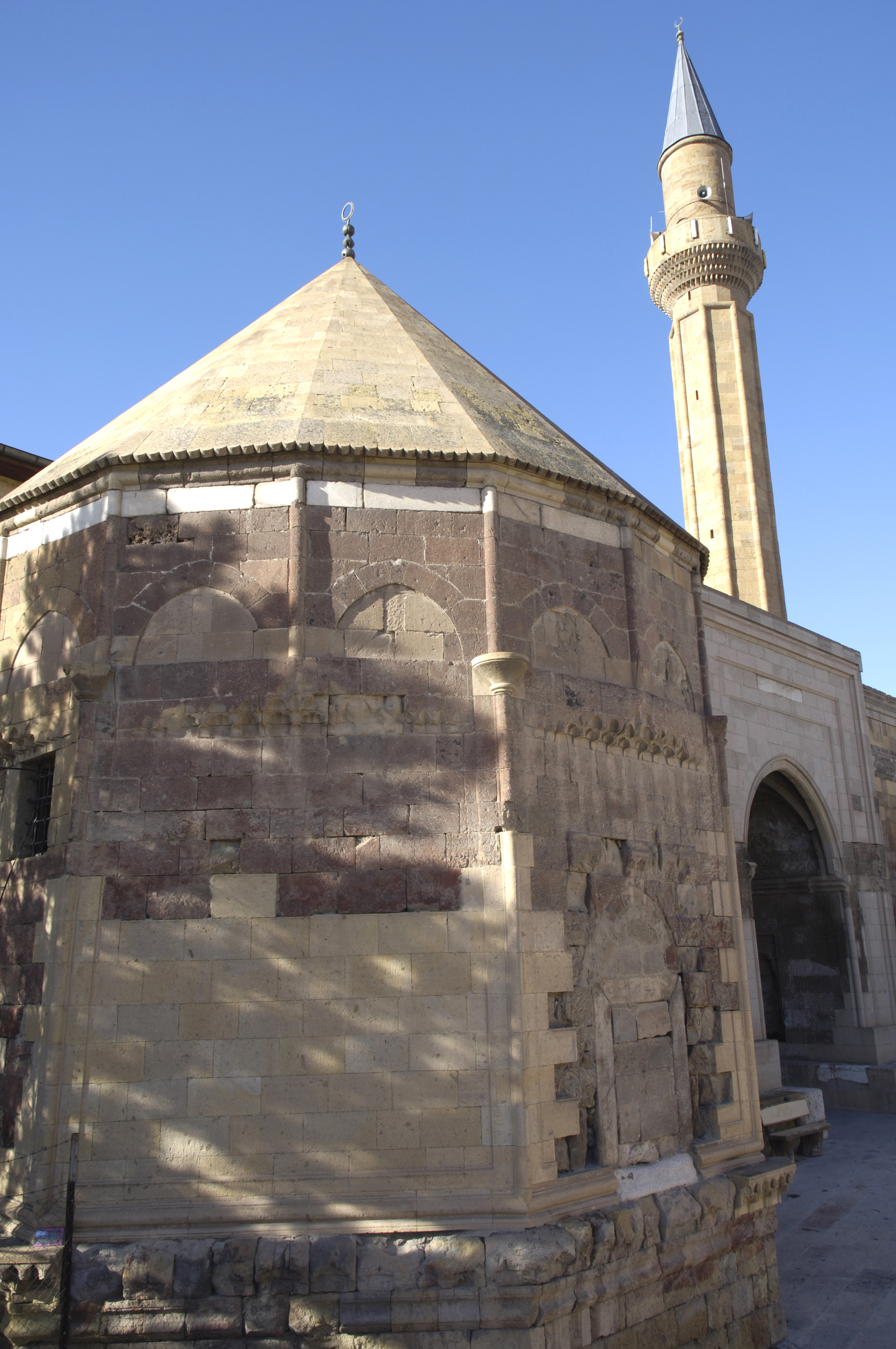
Sungurbey Mosque and mausoleum, Niğde

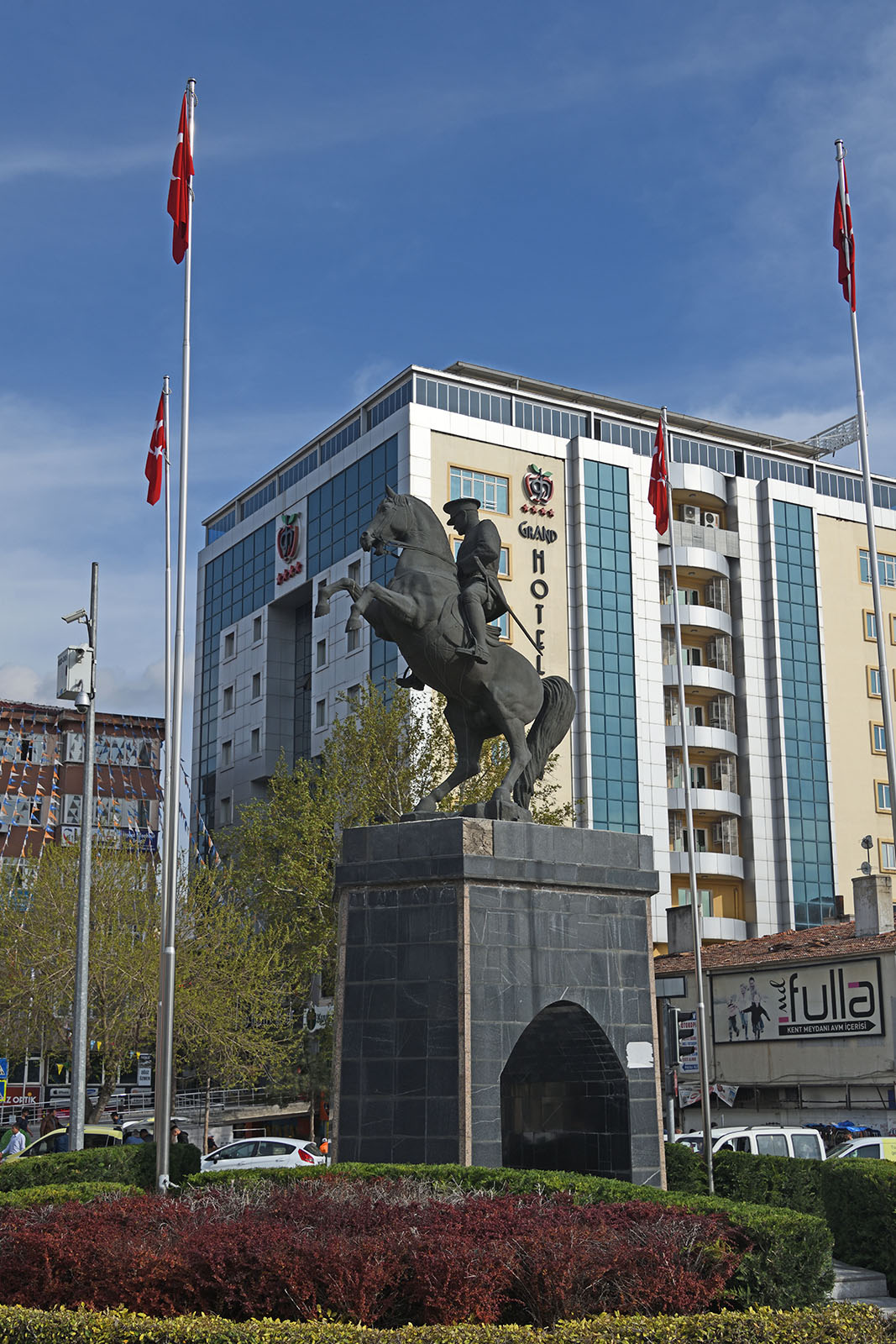
Hükümet Meydan (Government Square) in Niğde

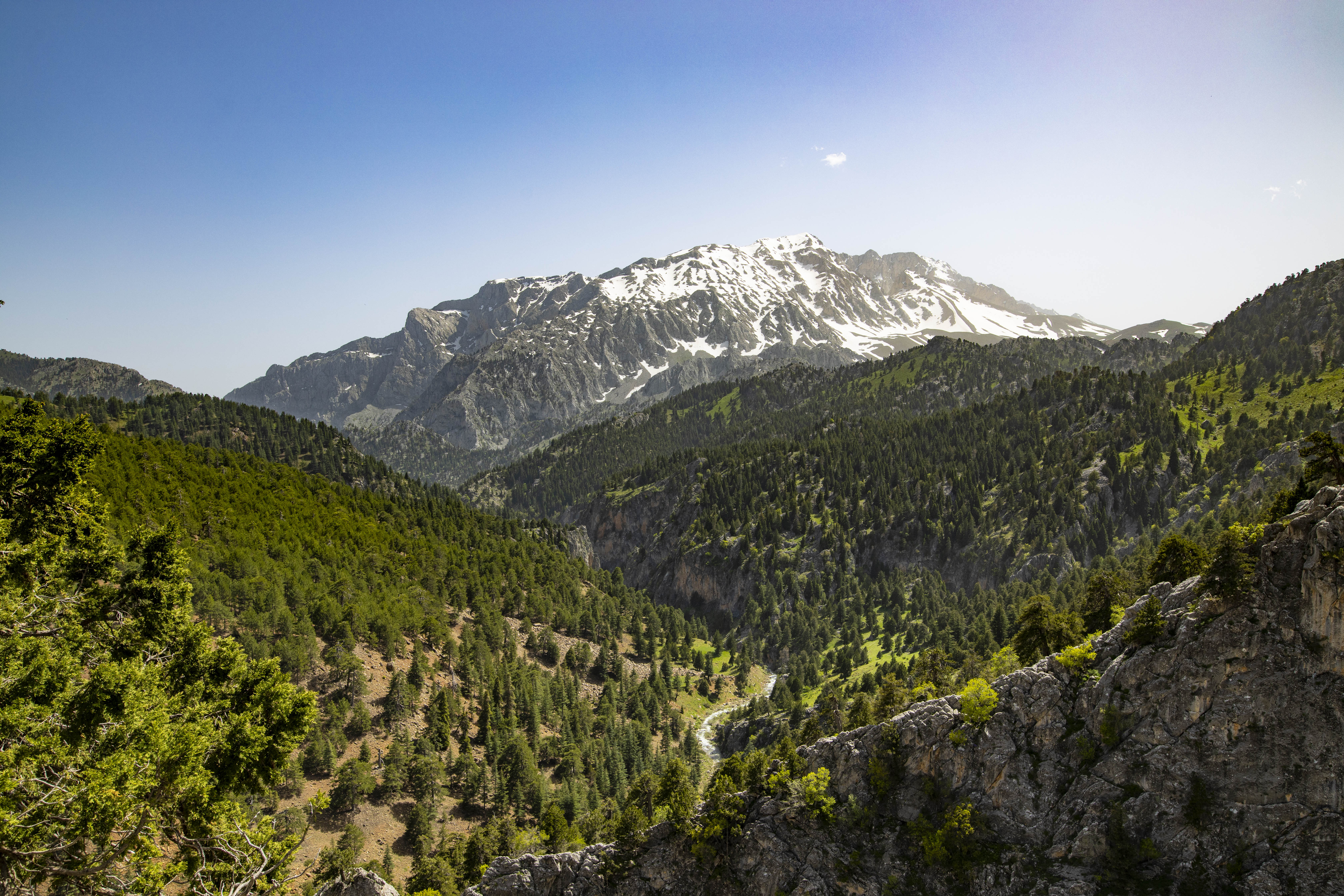
Aladağlar (Ala Mountains), near Niğde

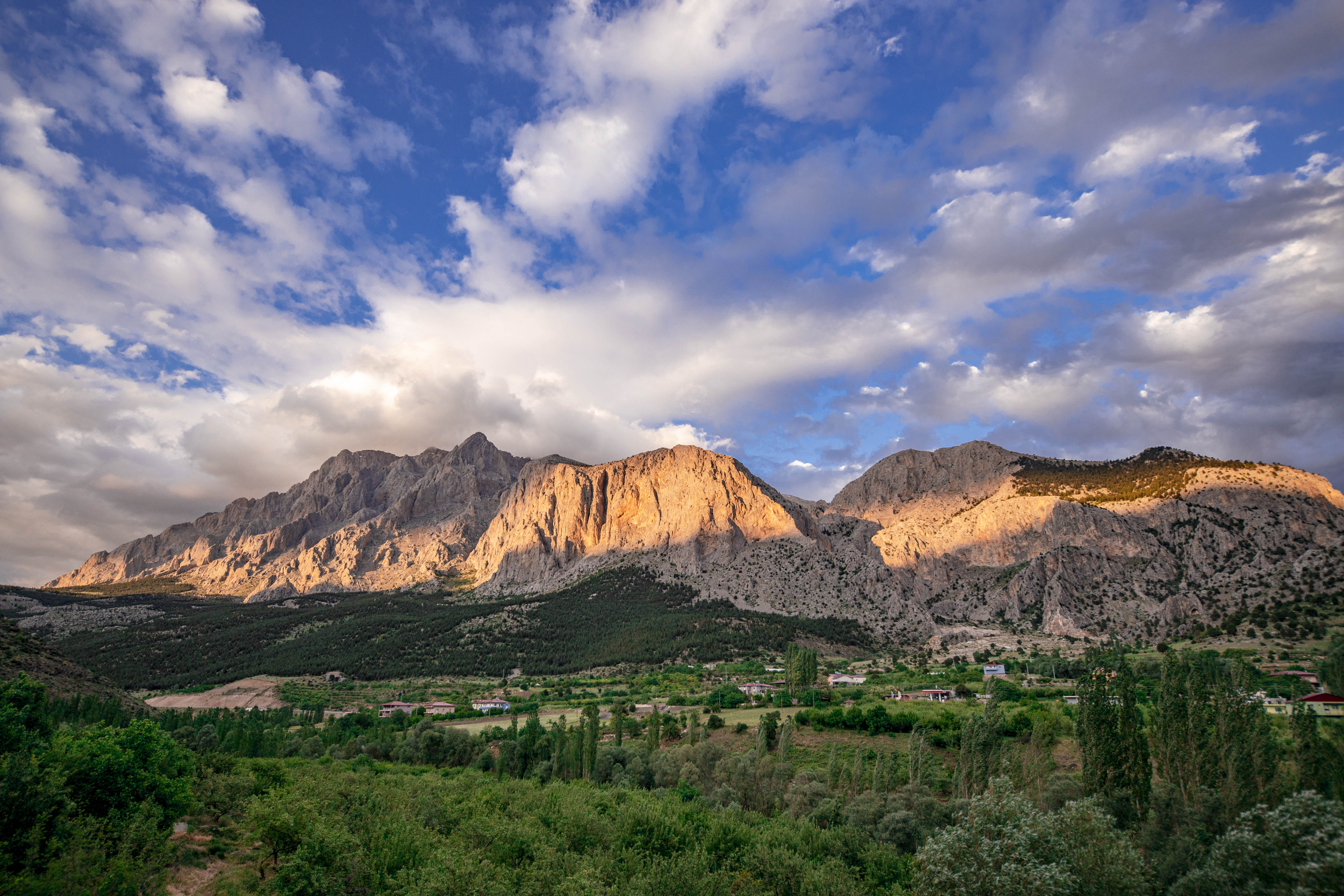
Aladağlar (Ala Mountains), near Niğde

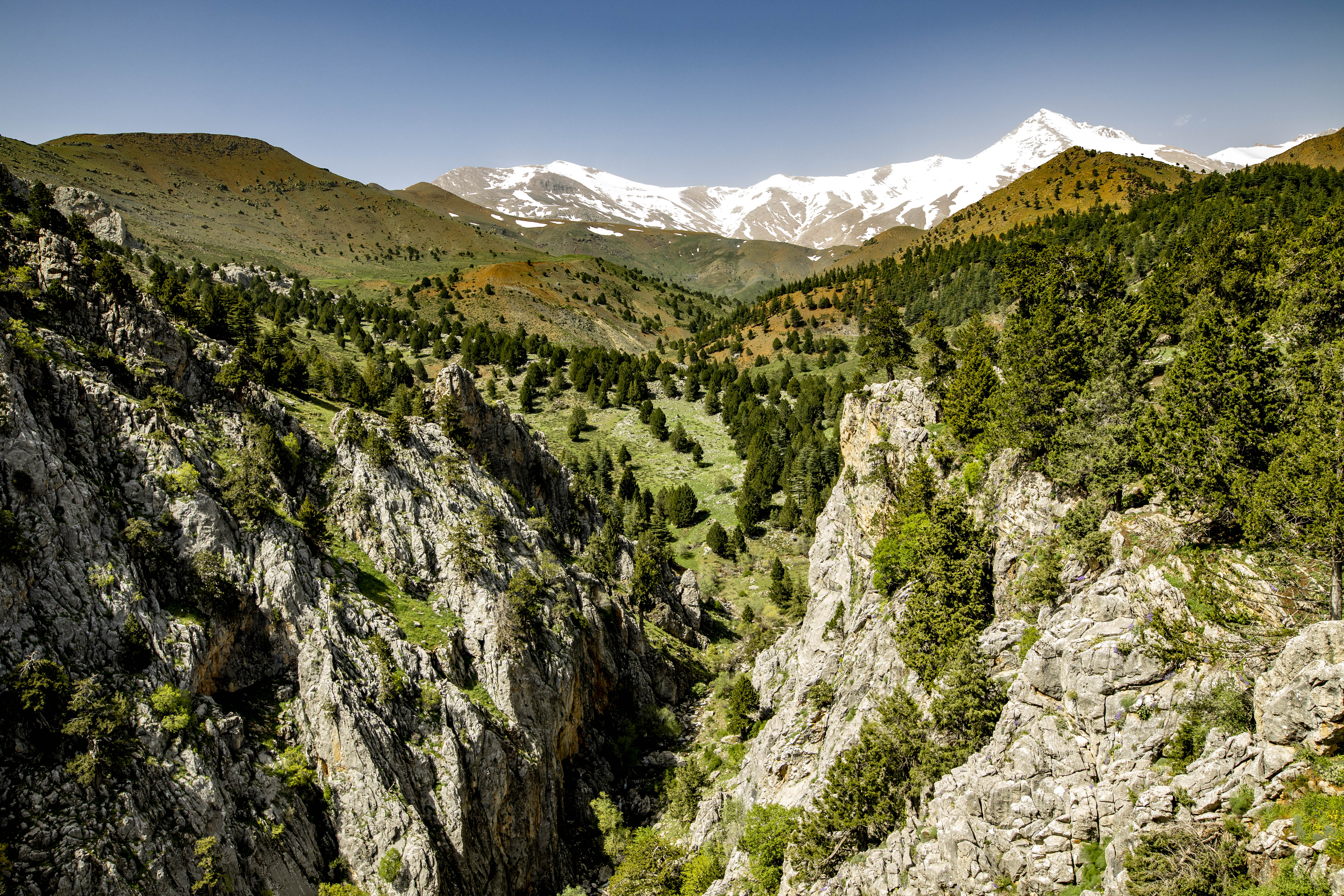
Aladağlar (Ala Mountains), near Niğde

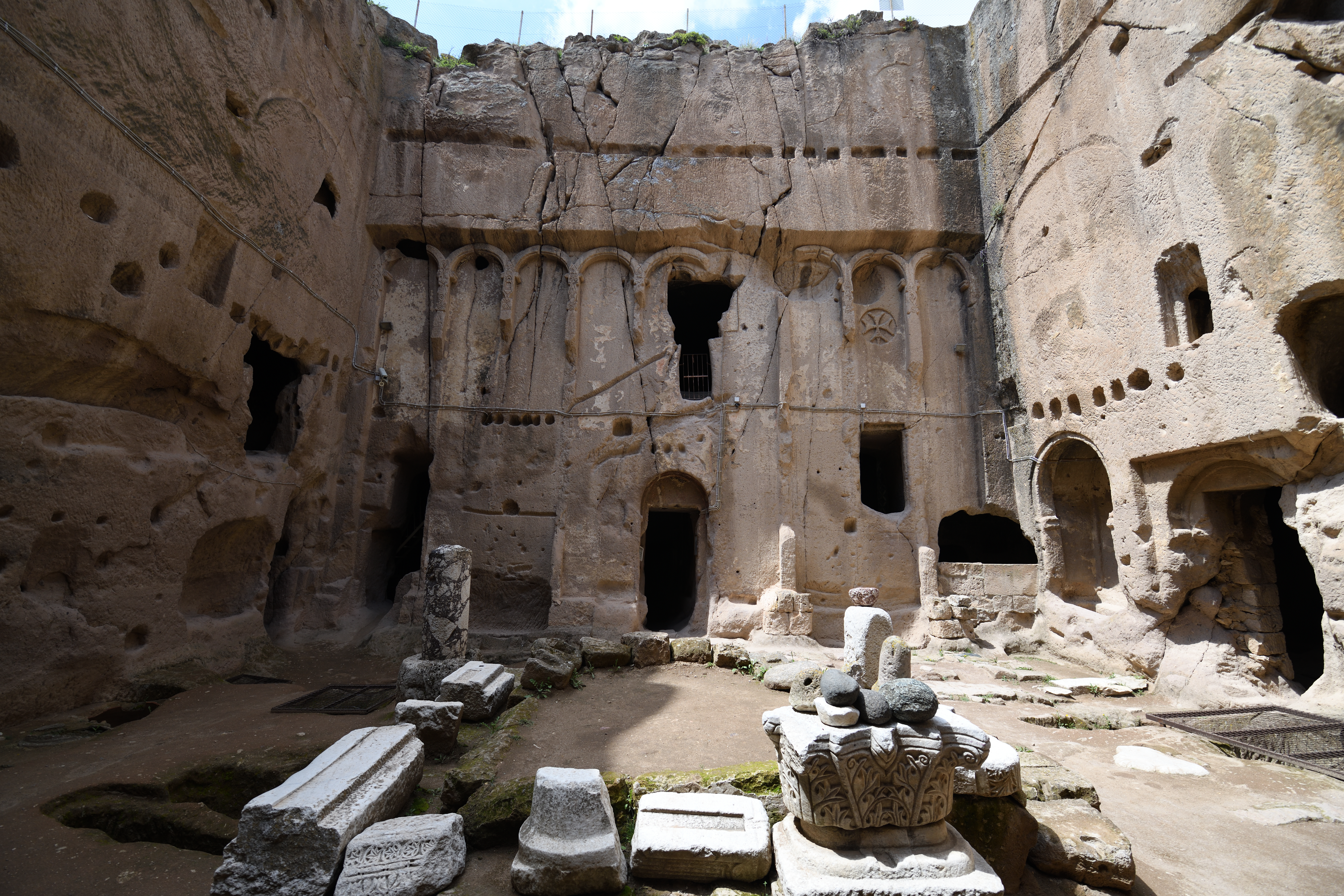
Eski Gümüşler Monastery, near Niğde

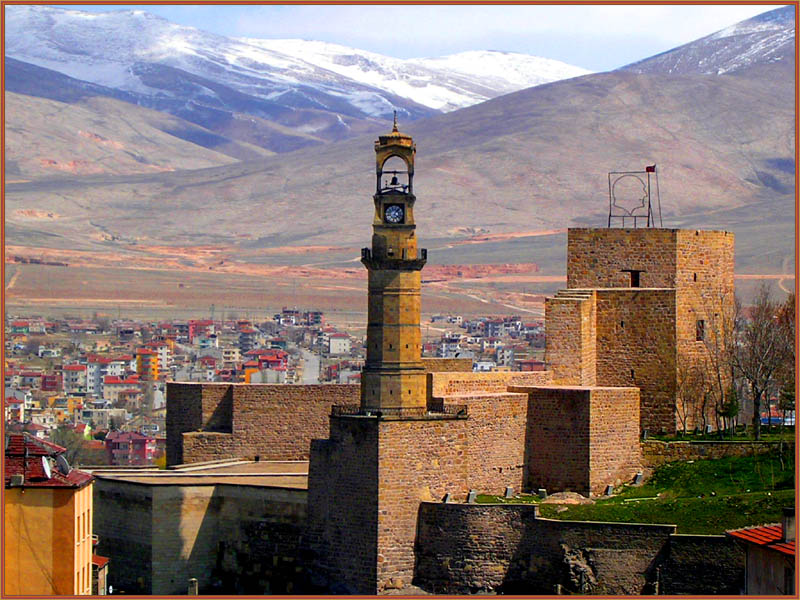
Niğde Castle and Clock tower

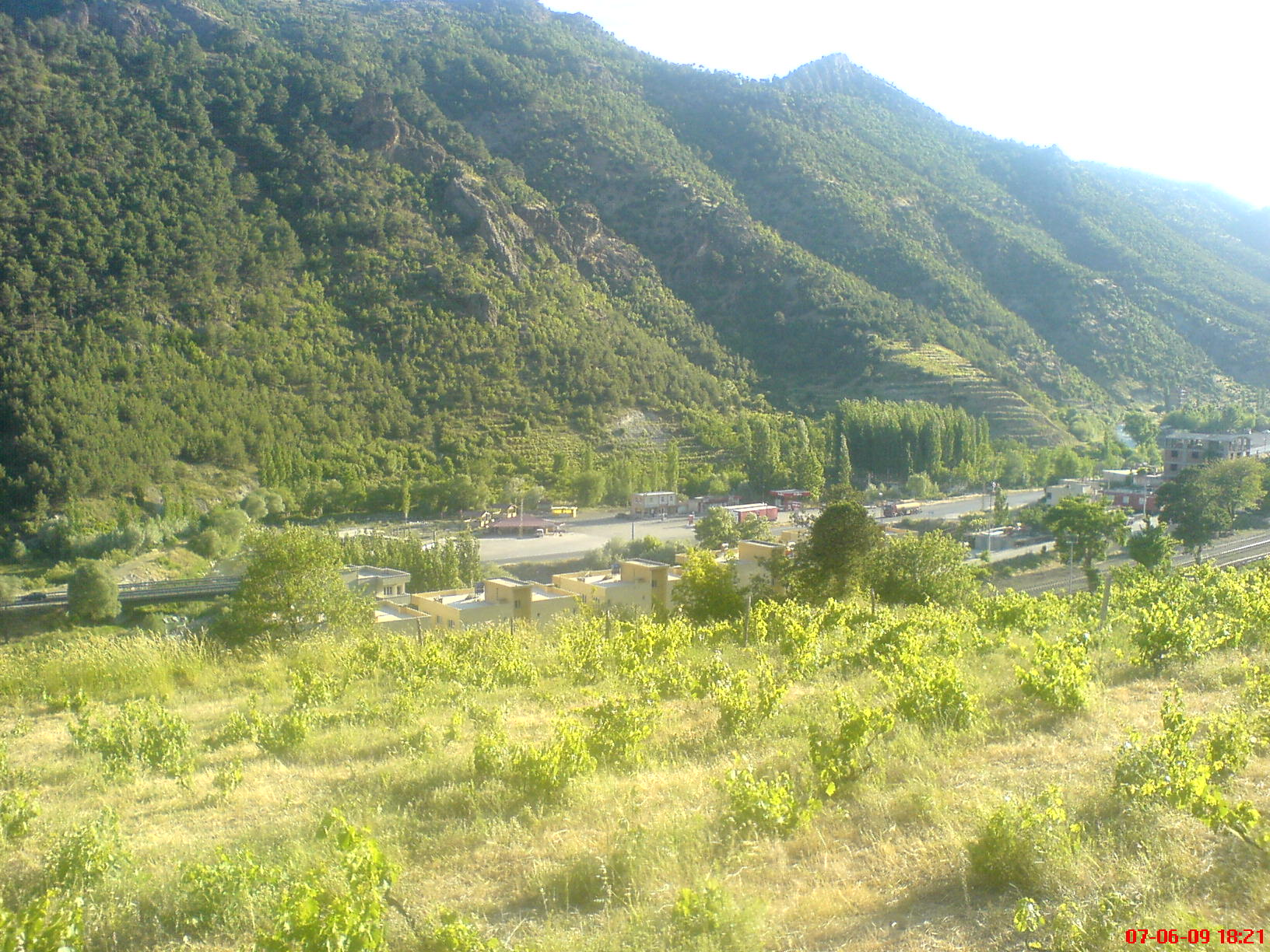
Çiftehan

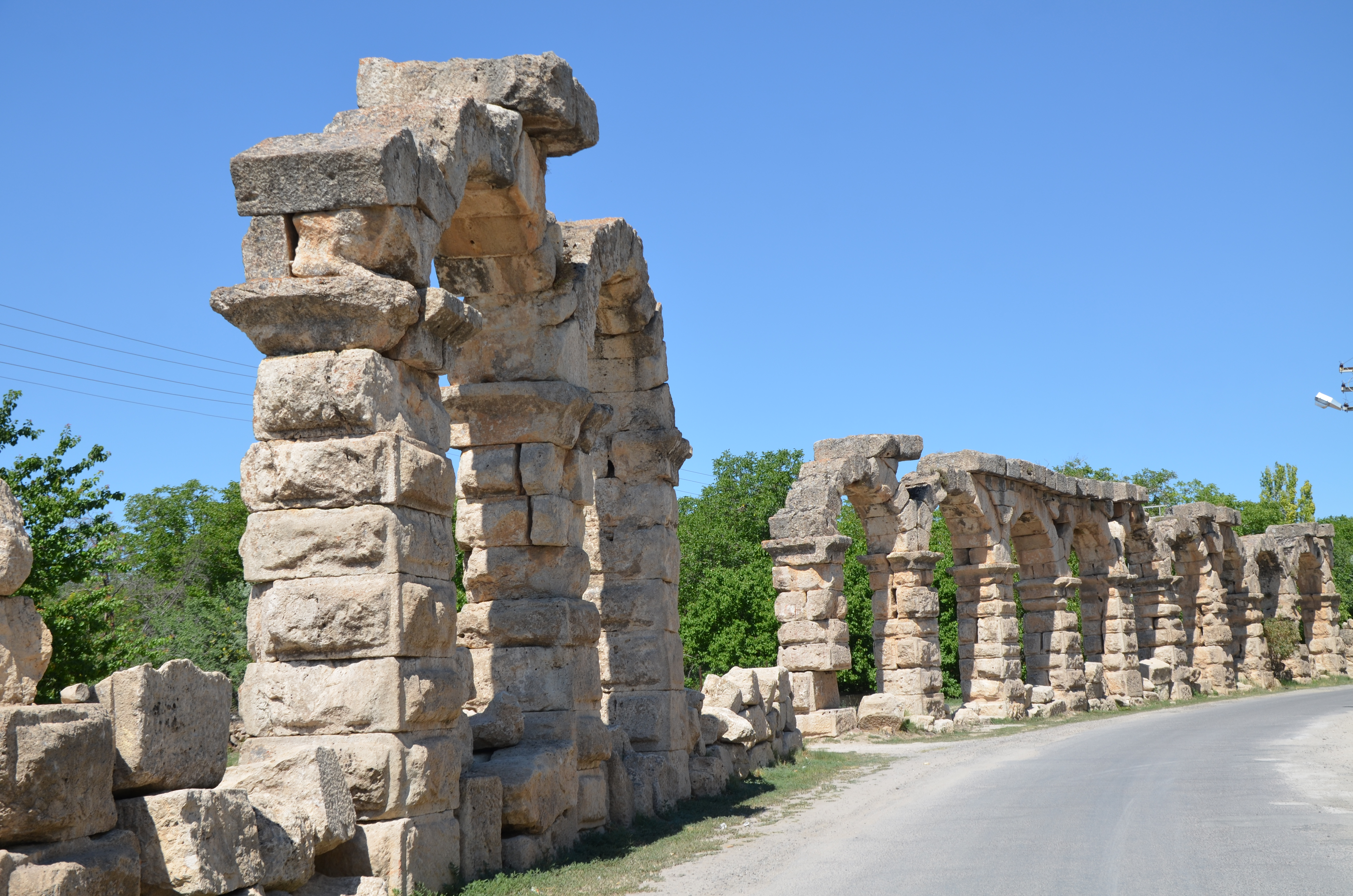
Ruins of Roman aqueduct in Tyana (Kemerhisar), near Niğde

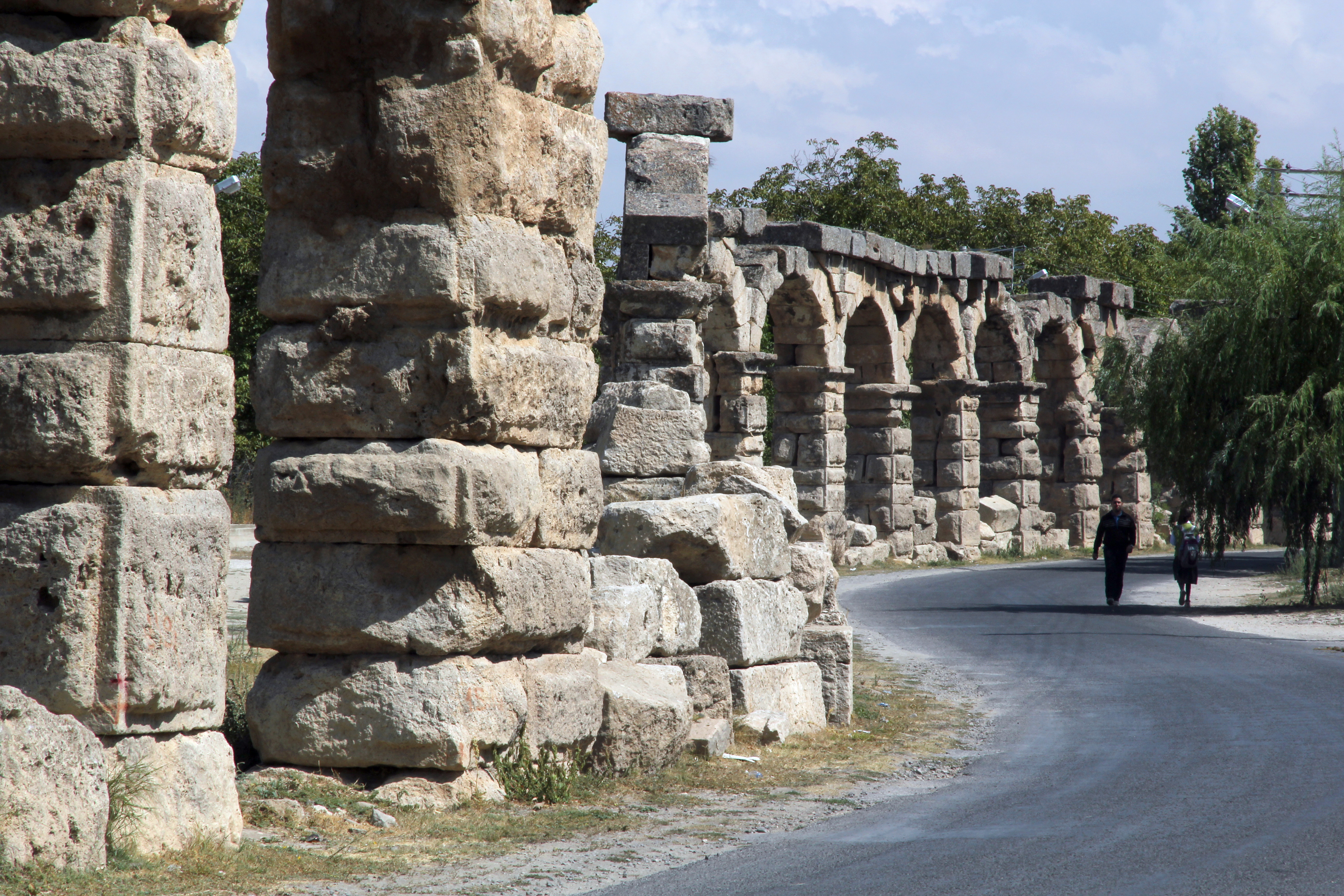
Ruins of Tyana (Kemerhisar) aqueduct, near Niğde

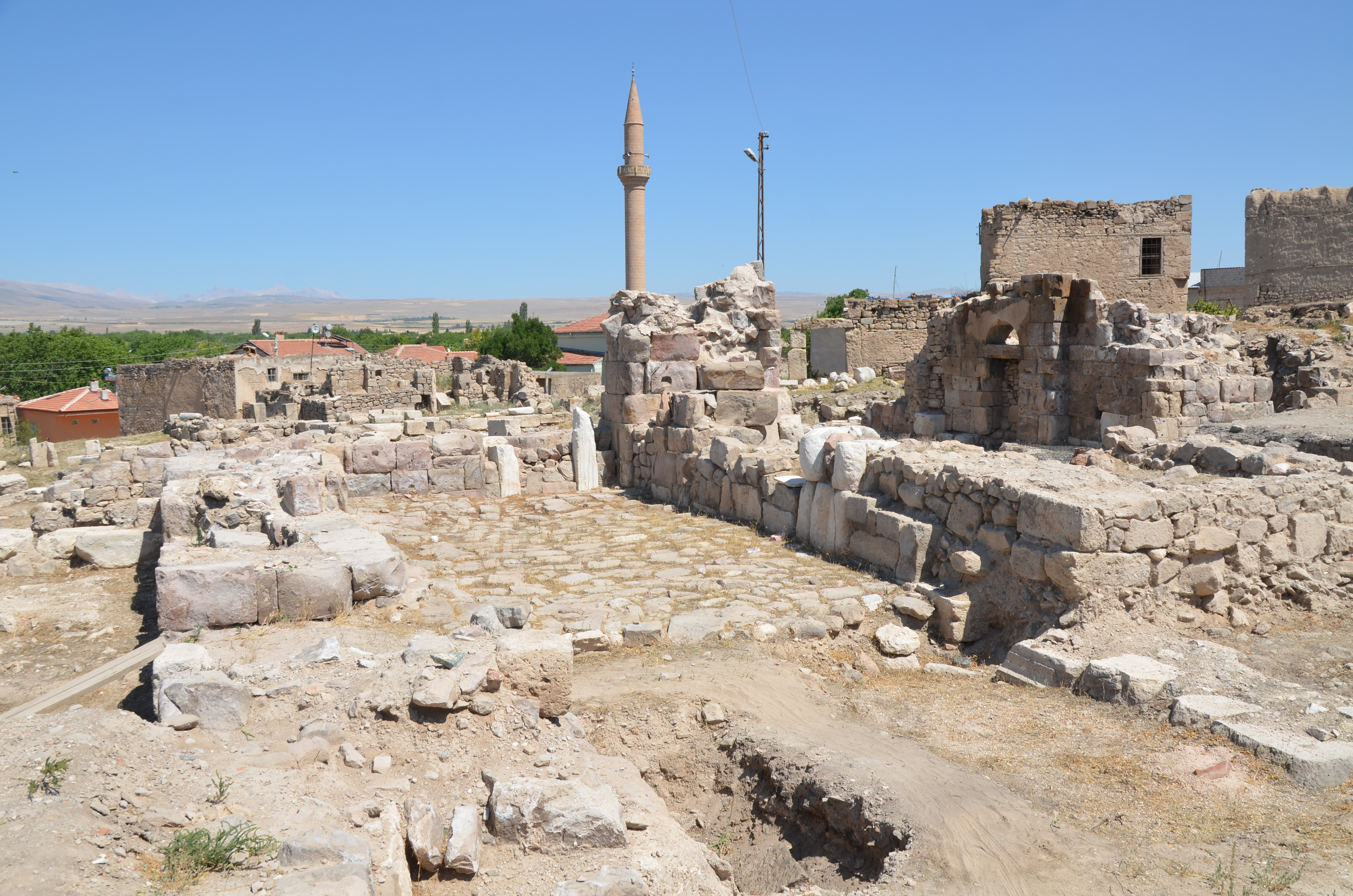
Ancient Tyana

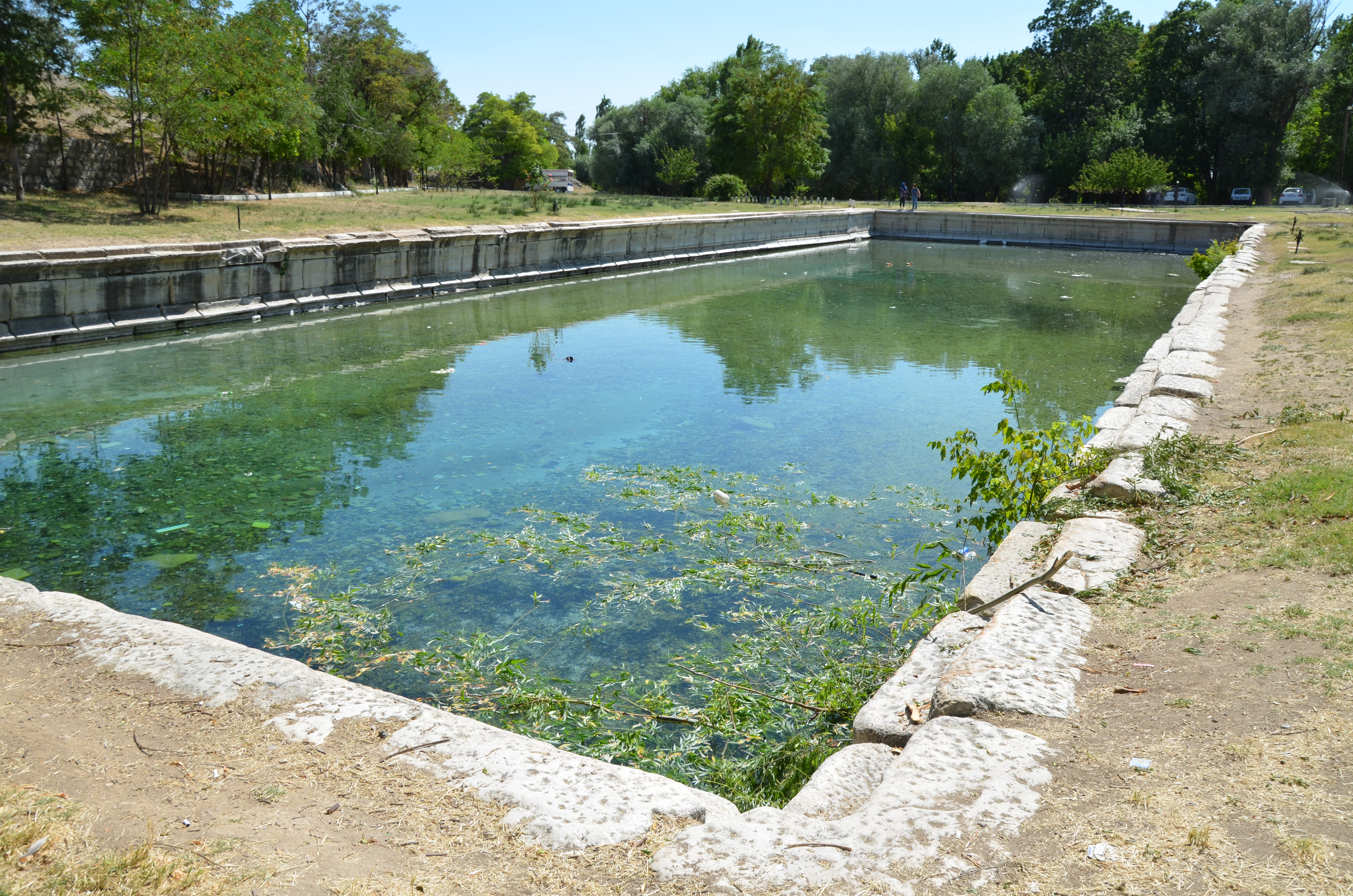
Roman pool in ancient Tyana (Kemerhisar), near Niğde

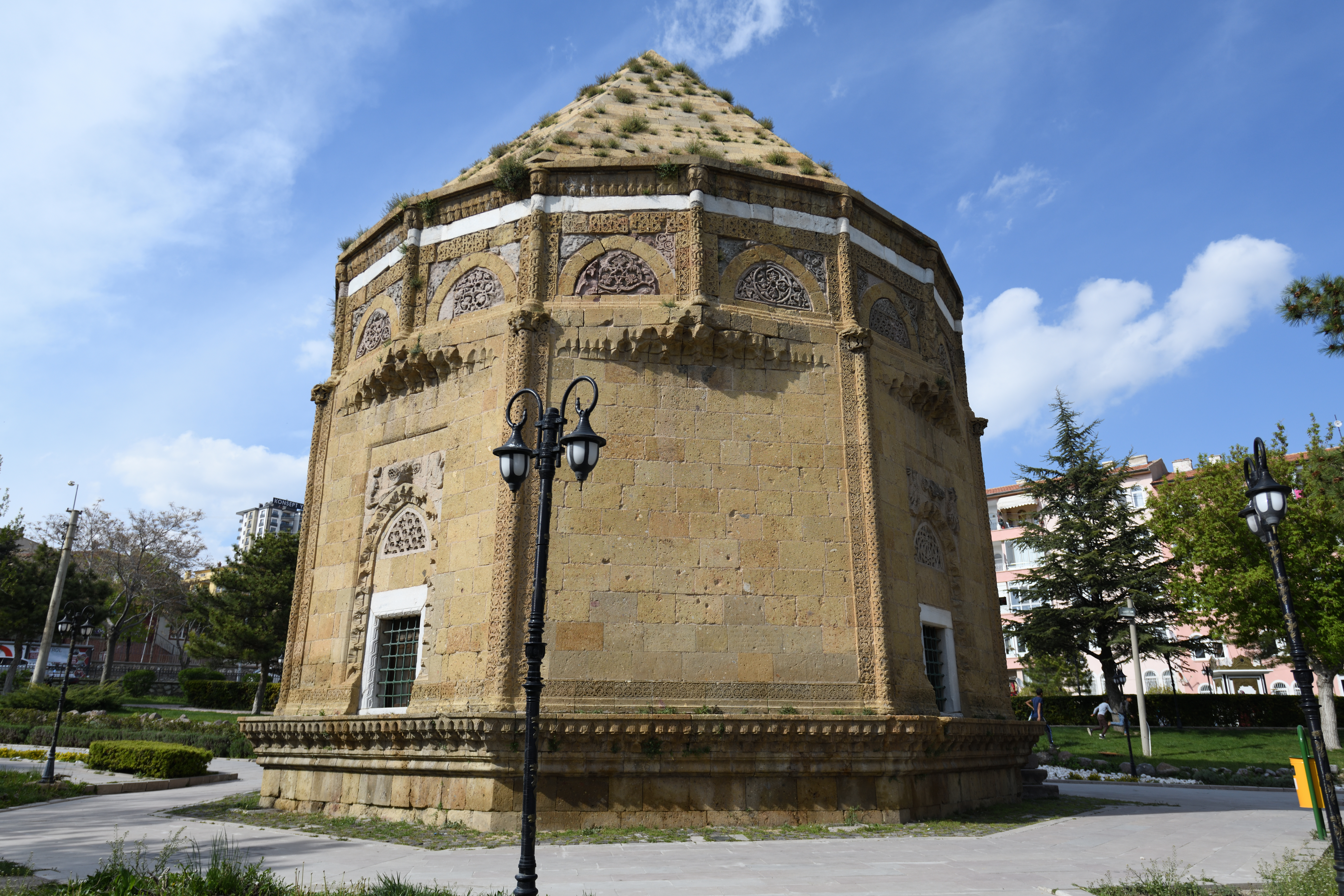
Hüdavent Hatun Mausoleum, Niğde

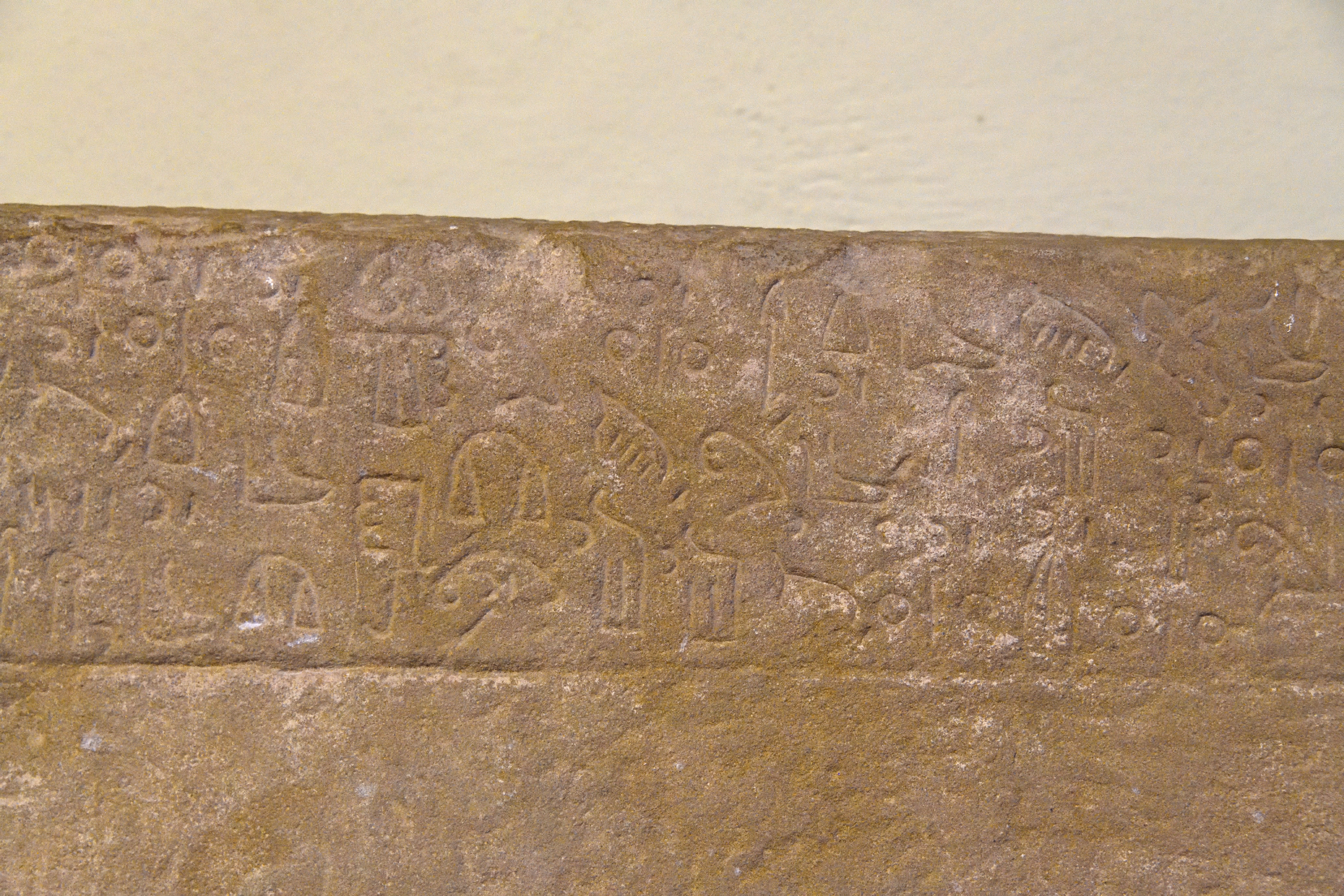
Late Hittite inscription from Porsuk (8th century) in Nigde museum

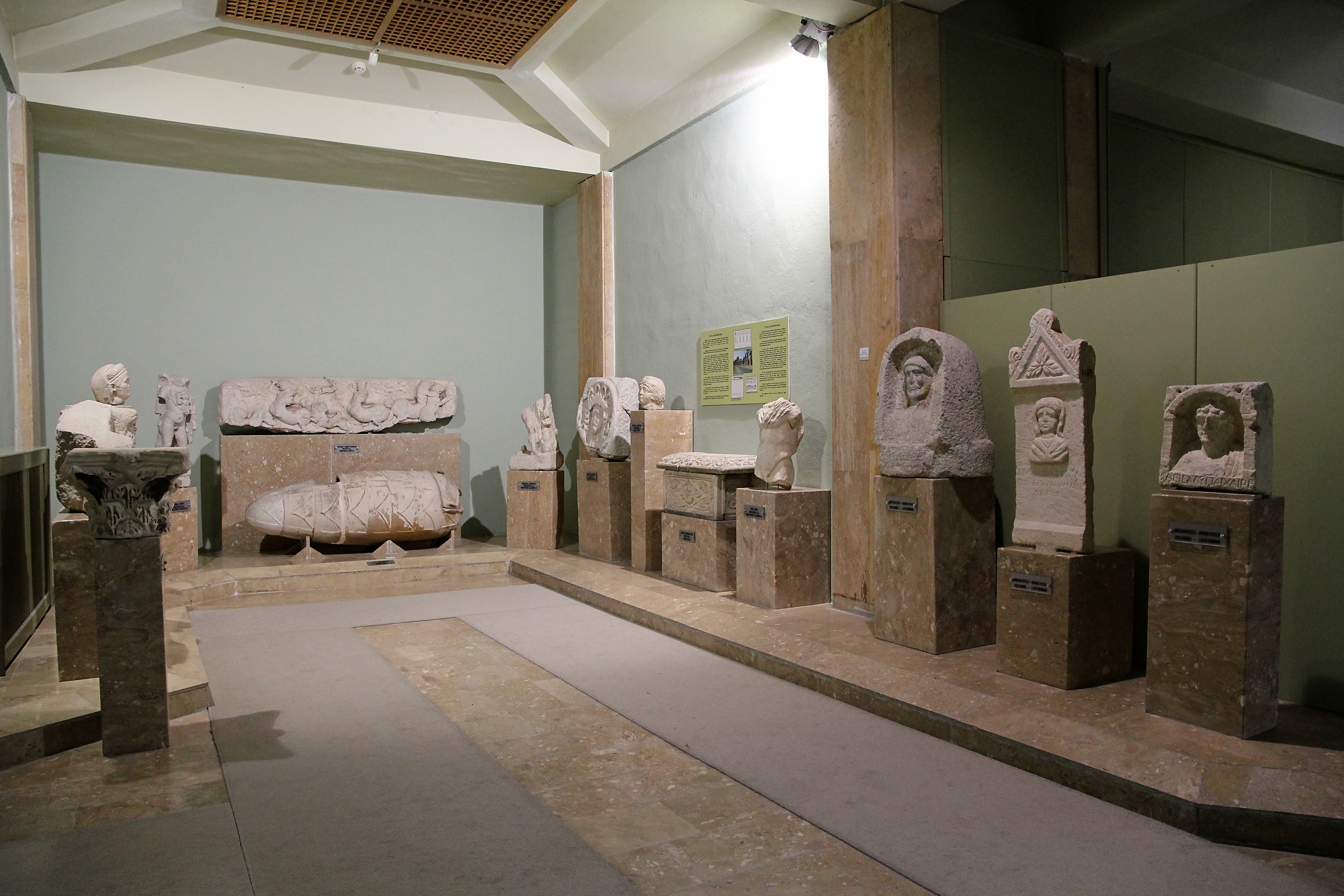
Finds from Tyana in Niğde Museum

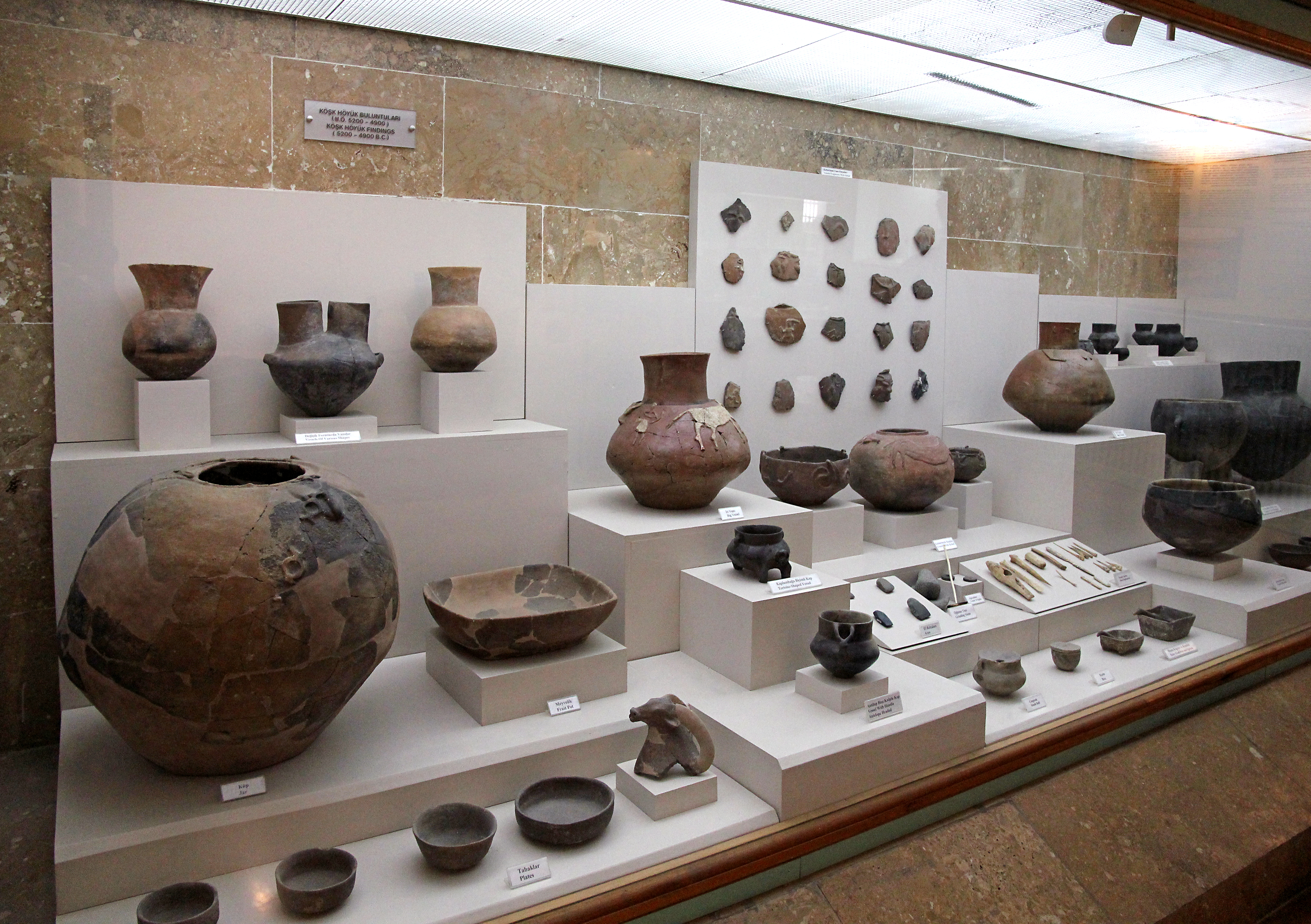
Niğde Museum

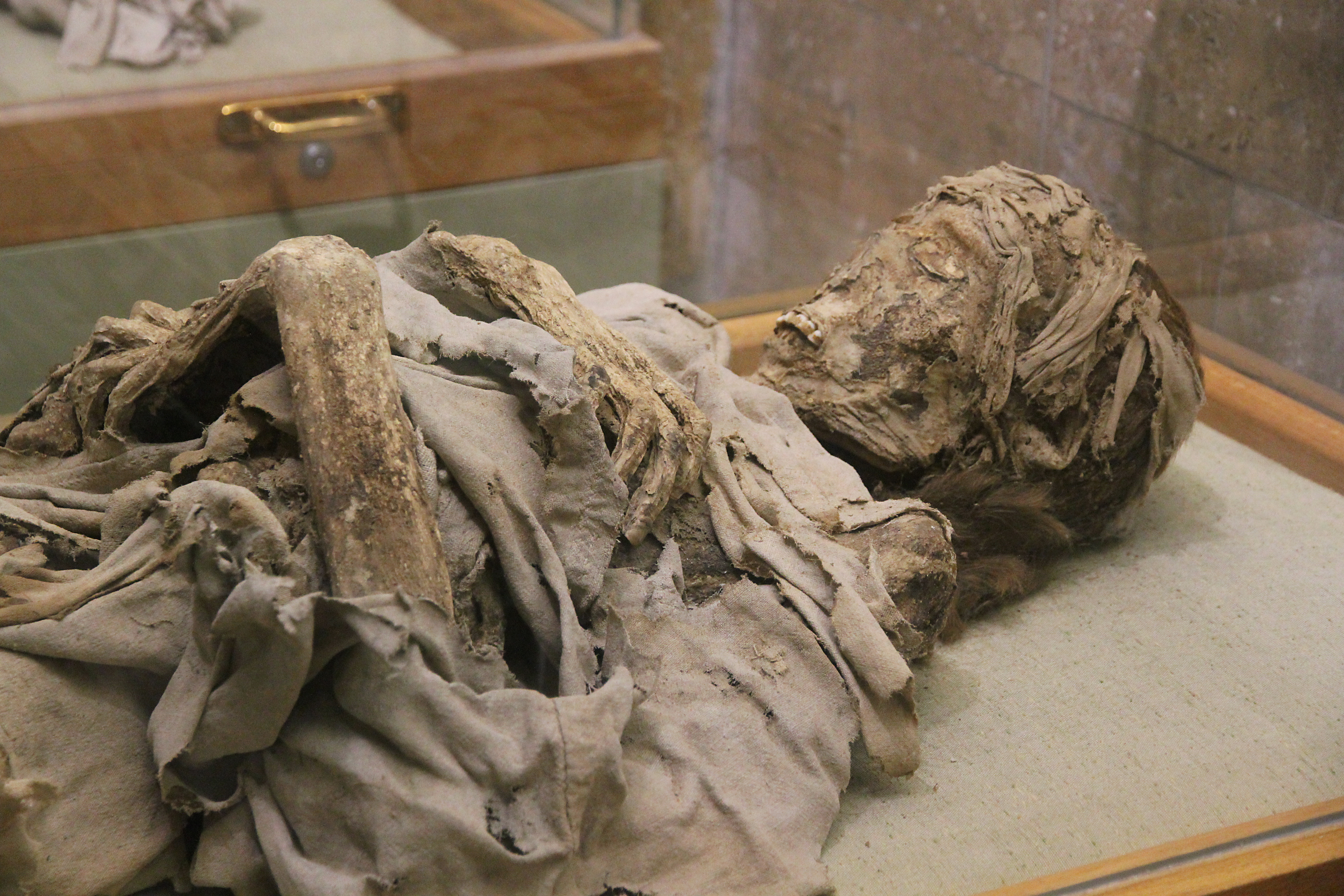
Niğde Museum: mummy thought to be of 1000-year-old nun

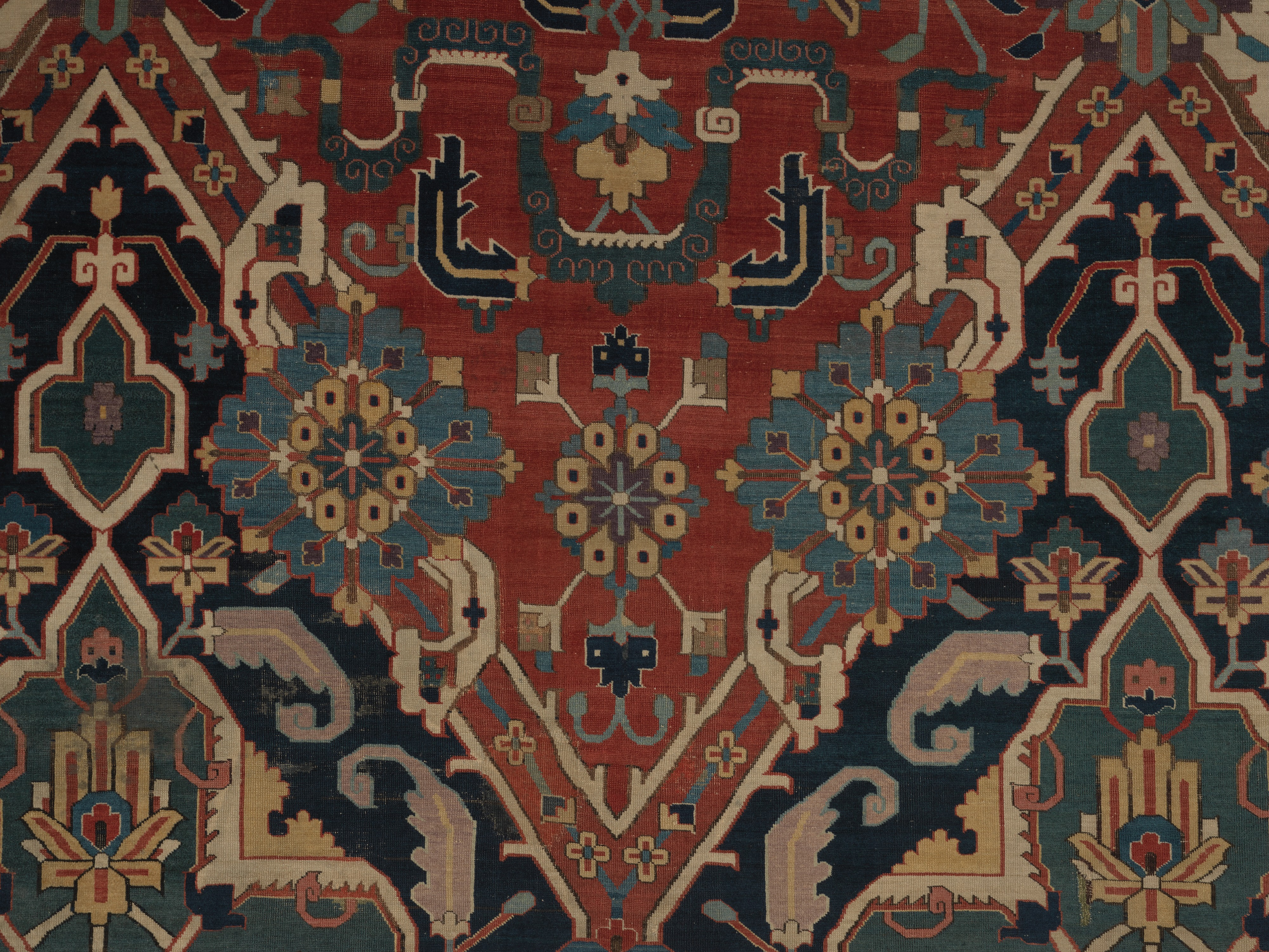
Niğde Carpet

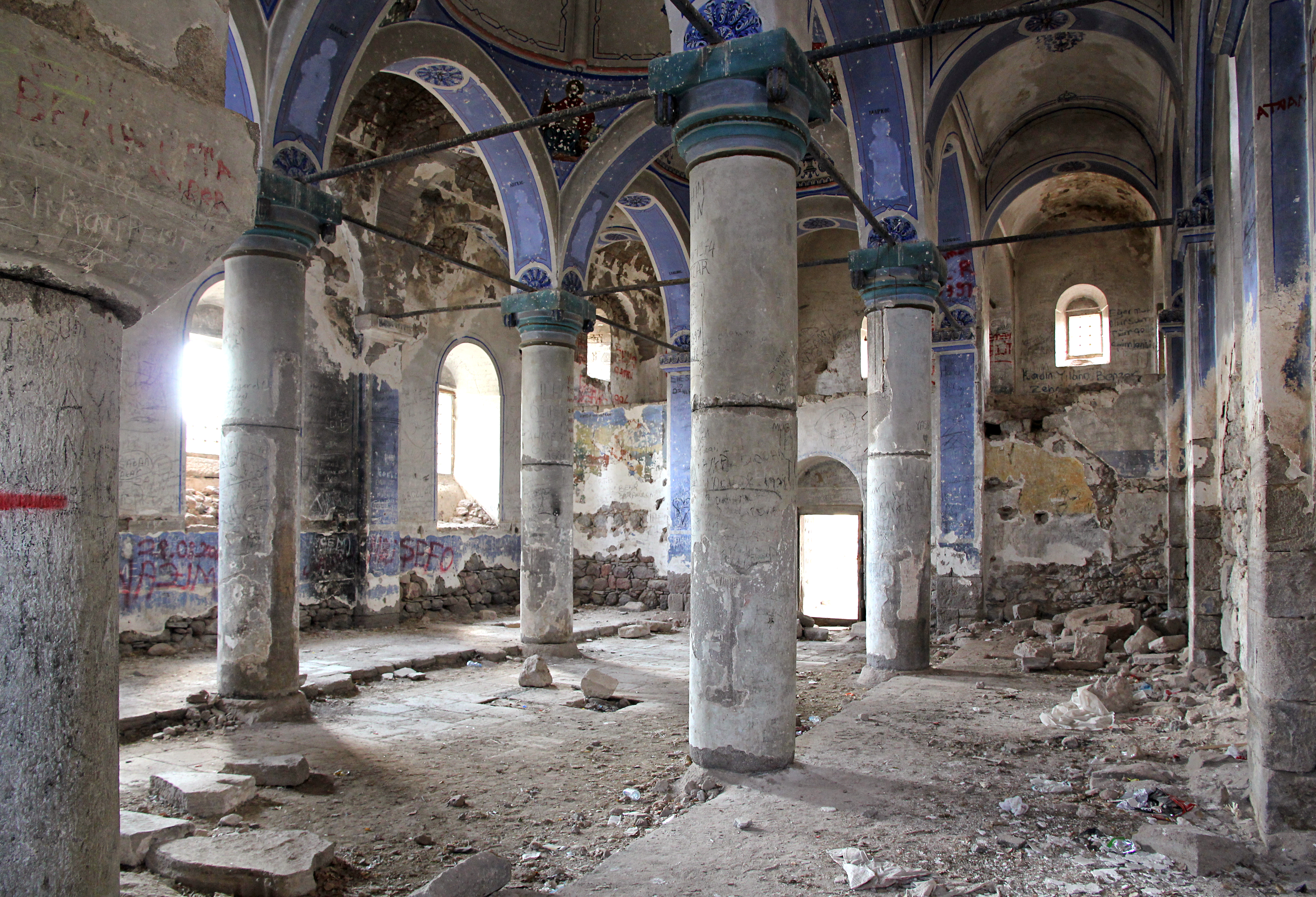
Inside Küçükköy Church

== Notable people ==
- Abdullah Durak, footballer
- Ayhan Şahenk, businessman
- Nükhet Duru, singer
- Emre Altuğ, Singer and actor
- Ebubekir Hazım Tepeyran
- Yılmaz Cemal Bor, (1934-2014), Member of Parliament (1977-1980) from the Nigde District
- Yıldız Kenter, actress
- Leonidas Kestekides (1876–1954), a Cappadocian Greek chocolate manufacturer from Nigde, Cappadocia and founder of the internationally famous Leonidas company in Belgium
- Petros Petridis (1892–1977), prominent Cappadocian Greek composer and conductor, born in Nigde (Cappodocia)
- Thanassis P. Aghnidès, (1889–1980), born in family estates (Kayabashi), graduated from Université Impériale de Constantinople with a law degree and the Sorbonne in Paris, France. He was a Greek-Ottoman diplomat, joined the SDN in 1919 and became undersecretary Geneva 1938-1942, chairman of the disarmament section at U.N. 1946-1960. He also served as Greek ambassador to the Court of St James in London 1942-1945.
- Elie P. Aghnidès (1901–1988), iInventor, best known of his inventions is the faucet aerator and the massage shower. Another of his inventions was the Rhino, an amphibious, 5-ton, 4-wheeled vehicle designed for multiple terrains. The prototype was built by Marmon-Harrington in Indianapolis.
- Nicholas P. Aghnidès, (1883–1974), author, Professor at Columbia University best seller Mohammedan Theories of finance.

== See also ==
- Anatolian Tigers
- Niğde Stele
