= Hacılar =

Hacılar or Hajjilar or Gadzhilyar or Gadzhylar or Gadzhilar may refer to:

== Places ==
=== Armenia ===
- Hajjilar, the former name of Mrgastan, Armenia

=== Azerbaijan ===
- Hacılar, Agdash, Azerbaijan
- Hacılar, Aghjabadi, Azerbaijan
- Hacılar, Barda, Azerbaijan
- Hacılar, Gadabay, Azerbaijan
- Hacılar, Khachmaz, Azerbaijan
- Hacılar, Lachin, Azerbaijan
- Hacılar, Tovuz, Azerbaijan

=== Turkey ===
- Hacılar Höyük, a town and district in Kayseri Province
- Hacılar, Kırıkkale, a town in Kırıkkale Province
- Hacılar, Burdur
- Hacılar, Çan
- Hacılar, Çerkeş
- Hacılar, Çubuk, a village in the district of Çubuk, Ankara Province
- Hacılar, Dursunbey, a village
- Hacılar, Gerede, a village in the district of Gerede, Bolu Province
- Hacılar, Gölbaşı, a village in the district of Gölbaşı, Adıyaman Province
- Hacılar, Güdül, a village in the district of Güdül, Ankara Province
- Hacılar, Gülşehir, a village in the district of Gülşehir, Nevşehir Province
- Hacılar, Kayseri, a town and district of Kayseri Province
- Hacılar, Kızılırmak
- Hacılar, Pazaryolu
- Hacılar, Sivrice
- Hacılar, Yenice
- Hacılar, Yığılca

== See also ==
- Hacılı (disambiguation)
