= Hacılar, Azerbaijan =

Hacılar, Azerbaijan may refer to:

- Hacılar, Agdash
- Hacılar, Aghjabadi
- Hacılar, Barda
- Hacılar, Gadabay
- Hacılar, Khachmaz
- Hacılar, Lachin
- Hacılar, Tovuz
