= Çeşməli =

Çeşməli may refer to:

- Çeşməli, Shaki, Azerbaijan
- Çeşməli, Tovuz, Azerbaijan
- Çeşmeli, Mersin Province, Turkey
