= Bozalqanlı =

Bozalqanlı may refer to:

- Bozalqanlı (Bozalganly), Azerbaijan
- Bozalqanlı (Boz Bozalganly), Azerbaijan
