= Kalagan =

Kalagan may refer to:

- Kalagan, Azerbaijan
- Kalagan, Iran
- Kalagan people
- Kalagan language
