= Dondarlı =

Dondarlı or Dondarly may refer to:

- Dondarlı, Qubadli, Azerbaijan
- Dondarlı, Tovuz, Azerbaijan
