= Abbasqulular =

Abbasqulular may refer to:

- Abbasqulular, Goranboy, Azerbaijan
- Abbasqulular, Tovuz, Azerbaijan
