= Hacılı =

Hacılı or Hajili or Hajyly may refer to:

- Hacılı, Barda, Azerbaijan
- Hacılı, Jabrayil, Azerbaijan
- Hacılı, Shamakhi, Azerbaijan

== See also ==
- Hacılar
