= Düz Cırdaxan =

Duz Jyrdakhan
- Municipality
- Azerbaijani: Düz Cırdaxan
- Location within Azerbaijan
- Coordinates: 41°01′11″N 45°36′40″E
- Country: Azerbaijan
- District: Tovuz

Population
  - Total: 2,681
- Time zone: UTC+4 (AZT)
  - Summer (DST): UTC+5 (AZT)

Düz Cırdaxan (also, Duz Jyrdakhan) is a village and municipality in the Tovuz District of Azerbaijan. It has a population of 2,681.
