= Cilovdarlı =

- Municipality
- Location within Azerbaijan
- Coordinates: 41°04′N 45°41′E
- Country: Azerbaijan
- Rayon: Tovuz

Population
  - Total: 1,237
- Time zone: UTC+4 (AZT)
  - Summer (DST): UTC+5 (AZT)

Cilovdarlı (also, Dzhilovdarly) is a village and municipality in the Tovuz Rayon of Azerbaijan. It has a population of 1,237.
