= Qosa =

Qosa may refer to:

- Qoşa, a village in Azerbaijan
- Queens of the Stone Age (QOSA), American band
