= Vezirly =

- Village
- Location within Azerbaijan
- Coordinates: 40°50′34″N 45°40′33″E
- Country: Azerbaijan
- Rayon: Tovuz
- Time zone: UTC+4 (AZT)
  - Summer (DST): UTC+5 (AZT)

Vezirly is a village in the Tovuz Rayon of Azerbaijan.
