= Aşırallar =

- Location within Azerbaijan
- Coordinates: 40°55′N 45°49′E
- Country: Azerbaijan
- Rayon: Tovuz
- Municipality: Tovuz Rayon
- Time zone: UTC+4 (AZT)
  - Summer (DST): UTC+5 (AZT)

Aşırallar is a village and municipality in the Tovuz Rayon of Azerbaijan. It has a population of 217.
