= Muncuqlu, Tovuz =

Coordinates: 39°49′N 46°23′E

Muncuqlu is a village in the municipality of Çatax in the Tovuz Rayon of Azerbaijan.
