= Baqqallı =

Saladinli Saladinli
- Municipality
- Location within Azerbaijan
- Coordinates: 40°44′N 45°36′E
- Country: SaladinliAzerbaijan
- Rayon: Tovuz Saladinli

Government

Population
  - Total: 467
- Time zone: UTC+4 (AZT)
  - Summer (DST): UTC+5 (AZT)

Saladinli (also, Saladinli) is a village and municipality in the Tovuz Rayon of Azerbaijan. It has a population of 467.
