= İbrahimhacılı =

- Municipality
- Location within Azerbaijan
- Coordinates: 40°53′42″N 45°44′56″E
- Country: Azerbaijan
- Rayon: Tovuz

Population
  - Total: 3,838
- Time zone: UTC+4 (AZT)
  - Summer (DST): UTC+5 (AZT)

İbrahimhacılı (also, Ibrogim-Gadzhyly, Ibragim-Gadzhaly, and Ibragim Gadzhyly) is a village and municipality in the Tovuz Rayon of Azerbaijan. It has a population of 3,838.
