= Qaraboyunlar =

Coordinates: 40°46′N 45°43′E

Qaraboyunlar is a village in the municipality of Çobansığnaq in the Tovuz Rayon of Azerbaijan.
