= Yanıqpəyə =

- Location within Azerbaijan
- Coordinates: 40°40′N 45°38′E
- Country: Azerbaijan
- Rayon: Tovuz
- Time zone: UTC+4 (AZT)
  - Summer (DST): UTC+5 (AZT)

Yanıqpəyə (also, Yanykhpeya) is a village in the Tovuz Rayon of Azerbaijan.
