= Almalıtala =

- Location within Azerbaijan
- Coordinates: 40°39′57″N 45°40′59″E
- Country: Azerbaijan
- Rayon: Tovuz
- Municipality: Ağbaşlar
- Time zone: UTC+4 (AZT)
  - Summer (DST): UTC+5 (AZT)

Almalıtala (also, Almalytala) is a village in the Tovuz Rayon of Azerbaijan. The village forms part of the municipality of Ağbaşlar.
