= Hacıhəsənli =

Coordinates: 40°49′N 45°38′E

Hacıhəsənli is a village and municipality in the Tovuz Rayon of Azerbaijan. It had a population of 604 as of 2009.
