= Azaflı =

- Municipality
- Location within Azerbaijan
- Coordinates: 40°55′43″N 45°39′45″E
- Country: Azerbaijan
- Rayon: Tovuz

Population
  - Total: 1,592
- Time zone: UTC+4 (AZT)
  - Summer (DST): UTC+5 (AZT)

Azaflı (known as Azaplı until 2012) is a village and municipality in the Tovuz Rayon of Azerbaijan. It has a population of 1,592.
