= Qandalar =

- Location within Azerbaijan
- Coordinates: 40°42′N 45°34′E
- Country: Azerbaijan
- Rayon: Tovuz
- Municipality: Çatax
- Time zone: UTC+4 (AZT)
  - Summer (DST): UTC+5 (AZT)

Qandalar (also, Qandallar and Kandalar) is a village in the Tovuz Rayon of Azerbaijan. The village forms part of the municipality of Çatax.
