= Səmədbəyli =

- Location within Azerbaijan
- Coordinates: 41°03′N 45°44′E
- Country: Azerbaijan
- Rayon: Tovuz
- Time zone: UTC+4 (AZT)
  - Summer (DST): UTC+5 (AZT)

Səmədbəyli (also, Samedbeyli) is a village in the Tovuz Rayon of Azerbaijan.
