= Çatax =

- Municipality
- Location within Azerbaijan
- Coordinates: 40°43′15″N 45°33′50″E
- Country: Azerbaijan
- Rayon: Tovuz

Population
  - Total: 3,189
- Time zone: UTC+4 (AZT)
  - Summer (DST): UTC+5 (AZT)

Çatax (also, Çataq and Chatakh) is a village and municipality in the Tovuz Rayon of Azerbaijan. It has a population of 3,189. The municipality consists of the villages of Çatax, Qandalar, Kazımlı, Qoşa, Cirdək, Muncuqlu, Pələkli, Şıxheybət, and Hacılar.
