= Pələkli =

- Location within Azerbaijan
- Coordinates: 40°44′52″N 45°34′37″E
- Country: Azerbaijan
- Rayon: Tovuz
- Municipality: Çatax
- Time zone: UTC+4 (AZT)
  - Summer (DST): UTC+5 (AZT)

Pələkli (also, Palekli and Pelekli) is a village in the Tovuz Rayon of Azerbaijan. The village forms part of the municipality of Çatax.
