= Gadzhyly =

Gadzhyly or Gadzhily may refer to:

- Hacılı (disambiguation), several places in Azerbaijan
- Hacılar, Kayseri, Azerbaijan
