= Kazımlı =

- Location within Azerbaijan
- Coordinates: 40°43′N 45°34′E
- Country: Azerbaijan
- Rayon: Tovuz
- Municipality: Çatax
- Time zone: UTC+4 (AZT)
  - Summer (DST): UTC+5 (AZT)

Kazımlı (also, Kyazymly) is a village in the Tovuz Rayon of Azerbaijan. The village forms part of the municipality of Çatax.
