= Əyyublu =

- Municipality
- Location within Azerbaijan
- Coordinates: 40°56′05″N 45°49′34″E
- Country: Azerbaijan
- Rayon: Tovuz

Population
  - Total: 9,983
- Time zone: UTC+4 (AZT)
  - Summer (DST): UTC+5 (AZT)

Əyyublu (known as Aşağı Ayıblı until 2012) is a village and municipality in the Tovuz Rayon of Azerbaijan.
