= Namxoş =

Coordinates: 40°44′N 45°42′E

Namxoş is a village in the municipality of Saritala in the Tovuz Rayon of Azerbaijan.
