= Orta Ceyrançöl =

- Location within Azerbaijan
- Coordinates: 41°06′25″N 45°51′32″E
- Country: Azerbaijan
- Rayon: Tovuz
- Time zone: UTC+4 (AZT)
  - Summer (DST): UTC+5 (AZT)

Orta Ceyrançöl (also, Dzheyranchël’) is a village in the Tovuz Rayon of Azerbaijan.
