= Çobansığnaq =

- Municipality
- Location within Azerbaijan
- Coordinates: 40°46′N 45°42′E
- Country: Azerbaijan
- Rayon: Tovuz

Population
  - Total: 1,589
- Time zone: UTC+4 (AZT)
  - Summer (DST): UTC+5 (AZT)

Çobansığnaq (also, Chobansygnakh) is a village and municipality in the Tovuz Rayon of Azerbaijan. It has a population of 1,589. The municipality consists of the villages of Çobansığnaq, Qaraboyunlar, Namxoş, and Yoğunbulaq.
