= Sarıtala =

- Municipality
- Location within Azerbaijan
- Coordinates: 40°43′47″N 45°42′58″E
- Country: Azerbaijan
- Rayon: Tovuz

Population
  - Total: 615
- Time zone: UTC+4 (AZT)
  - Summer (DST): UTC+5 (AZT)

Sarıtala (also, Sarytala) is a village and municipality in the Tovuz Rayon of Azerbaijan. It has a population of 615. The municipality consists of the villages of Sarıtala and Dondarlı.
