= Lazılar =

- Location within Azerbaijan
- Coordinates: 40°38′49″N 45°37′16″E
- Country: Azerbaijan
- Rayon: Tovuz
- Municipality: Ağbaşlar
- Time zone: UTC+4 (AZT)
  - Summer (DST): UTC+5 (AZT)

Lazılar (also, Lazylar) is a village in the Tovuz Rayon of Azerbaijan. The village forms part of the municipality of Ağbaşlar.
