= Qazıqulu =

- Municipality
- Location within Azerbaijan
- Coordinates: 40°58′N 45°38′E
- Country: Azerbaijan
- Rayon: Tovuz

Population
  - Total: 702
- Time zone: UTC+4 (AZT)
  - Summer (DST): UTC+5 (AZT)

Qazıqulu (Qazqulu) (also, Gazkulu) is a village and municipality in the Tovuz Rayon of Azerbaijan. It has a population of 702.
