= Ağbaşlar =

- Municipality
- Location within Azerbaijan
- Coordinates: 40°38′32″N 45°39′44″E
- Country: Azerbaijan
- Rayon: Tovuz

Population
  - Total: 951
- Time zone: UTC+4 (AZT)
  - Summer (DST): UTC+5 (AZT)

Ağbaşlar (also, Agbashlar) is a village and municipality in the Tovuz Rayon of Azerbaijan. It has a population of 951. The municipality consists of the villages of Ağbaşlar, Almalıtala, and Lazılar.
