= Xatınlı =

- Municipality
- Location within Azerbaijan
- Coordinates: 41°02′54″N 45°38′34″E
- Country: Azerbaijan
- Rayon: Tovuz

Population
  - Total: 2,963
- Time zone: UTC+4 (AZT)
  - Summer (DST): UTC+5 (AZT)

Xatınlı (also, Khatunly and Khatynly) is a village and municipality in the Tovuz Rayon of Azerbaijan. It has a population of 2,963.
