= Düz Qırıqlı =

Duz Gyrygly
- Municipality
- Azerbaijani: Düz Qırıqlı
- Location within Azerbaijan
- Coordinates: 40°56′33″N 45°47′51″E
- Country: Azerbaijan
- District: Tovuz

Population
  - Total: 7,800
- Time zone: UTC+4 (AZT)
  - Summer (DST): UTC+5 (AZT)

Düz Qırıqlı (also, Duz Gyrygly) is a village and municipality in the Tovuz District of Azerbaijan. It has a population of 7,800.

== Notable natives ==
- Ganira Pashayeva, Member (MP) of the National Assembly of Azerbaijan for Tovuz District and journalist
