= Dönük Qırıqlı =

- Municipality
- Location within Azerbaijan
- Coordinates: 40°56′15″N 45°44′15″E
- Country: Azerbaijan
- Rayon: Tovuz

Population
  - Total: 3,577
- Time zone: UTC+4 (AZT)
  - Summer (DST): UTC+5 (AZT)

Dönük Qırıqlı (also, Dënyuk Kyrykly and Denyuk-Kurukhly) is a village and municipality in the Tovuz Rayon of Azerbaijan. It has a population of 3,577.
