= Yoğunbulaq =

Coordinates: 40°45′N 45°43′E

Yoğunbulaq is a village in the municipality of Çobansığnaq in the Tovuz Rayon of Azerbaijan. It is located in the north west of the country.
