= Cirdək =

- Location within Azerbaijan
- Coordinates: 40°43′06″N 45°35′40″E
- Country: Azerbaijan
- Rayon: Tovuz
- Municipality: Çatax
- Time zone: UTC+4 (AZT)
  - Summer (DST): UTC+5 (AZT)

Cirdək (also, Dzhirdek) is a village in the Tovuz Rayon of Azerbaijan. The village forms part of the municipality of Çatax.
