= Saladınlı =

- Municipality
- Location within Azerbaijan
- Coordinates: 40°44′08″N 45°35′53″E
- Country: Azerbaijan
- Rayon: Tovuz

Population
  - Total: 126
- Time zone: UTC+4 (AZT)
  - Summer (DST): UTC+5 (AZT)

Saladınlı (also, Saladynly) is a village and the least populous municipality in the Tovuz Rayon of Azerbaijan. It has a population of 126. It is located in the Northeastern region of Azerbaijan.
