= Abulbəyli =

Municipality of Azerbaijan

Coordinates: 40°59′N 45°38′E

Abulbəyli is a village and municipality in the Tovuz Rayon of Azerbaijan. It has a population of 5,653.
