= Ağacqala =

- Municipality
- Location within Azerbaijan
- Coordinates: 40°47′N 45°42′E
- Country: Azerbaijan
- Rayon: Tovuz

Population
  - Total: 334
- Time zone: UTC+4 (AZT)
  - Summer (DST): UTC+5 (AZT)

Ağacqala (also, Ağaçqala and Agachkala) is a village and municipality in the Tovuz Rayon of Azerbaijan. It has a population of 334.
