= Ganira Pashayeva =

Azerbaijani politician (1975–2023)

- Qənirə Paşayeva
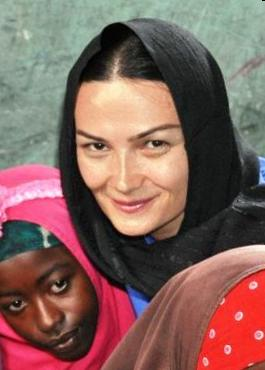
- Pashayeva in Somalia, 2012

Member of the Azerbaijan Parliament for Tovuz District
- In office 6 November 2005 – 28 September 2023
- Preceded by: New constituency

Personal details
- Born: 7 March 1975 Duz Gyrygly, Tovuz District, Azerbaijan SSR, Soviet Union
- Died: 28 September 2023 (aged 48) II Alley of Honor Baku, Azerbaijan
- Party: Independent
- Education: Baku State University

Ganira Alasgar gyzy Pashayeva (Azerbaijani: Qənirə Ələsgər qızı Paşayeva, 24 March 1975 – 28 September 2023) was an Azerbaijani politician who was a Member of the National Assembly of Azerbaijan from 2005 until her death in 2023.

== Early life and education ==
Ganira Pashayeva was born in the village of Düz Qırıqlı of Tovuz Rayon on 24 March 1975. She graduated from the Pediatrics Department at Azerbaijan State Medical University, and the Department of International Law at the Baku State University in Baku. She was able to speak Turkish, English and Russian.

== Career ==
From 1998, Pashayeva worked as a reporter, correspondent, editor, leading editor, senior leading editor and deputy editor-in-chief of the news section at the ANS Group of Companies. In 2005, she became head of public relations department of the Heydar Aliyev Foundation.

In 2012, Pashayeva worked as a pediatrician for two weeks in Somalia and helped the residents.

=== Political career ===
On 6 November 2005, she was elected Member of Parliament from Tovuz Constituency No 105. She was a member of the Standing Commission of the National Assembly of Azerbaijan on International and Inter-Parliamentary Relations and head of the Azerbaijan–Georgia working group on interparliamentary relations. She was also a member of the Azerbaijan–India, Azerbaijan–Turkey and Azerbaijan–Japan working groups on interparliamentary relations. She was one of the members of the delegation of the Republic of Azerbaijan to the Parliamentary Assembly of the Council of Europe.

== Death ==
On 24 September 2023, Pashayeva fell into a coma as a result of exposure to medicine and was taken to the Central Clinical Hospital in Baku. She died four days later, on 28 September, in an intensive care unit.

== Awards ==
- Honorary citizen of Georgia.
- Azerbaijan Democratic Republic 100th anniversary medal.
- "Ashiq Alasgar" – 200" jubilee medal.
- Order of "Honor" (Georgia)
- Jubilee medal "Tataristan 1920-2020".
