= Niğde Archaeological Museum =

Archaeological museum in Turkey

- Niğde Arkeolojik Müzesi
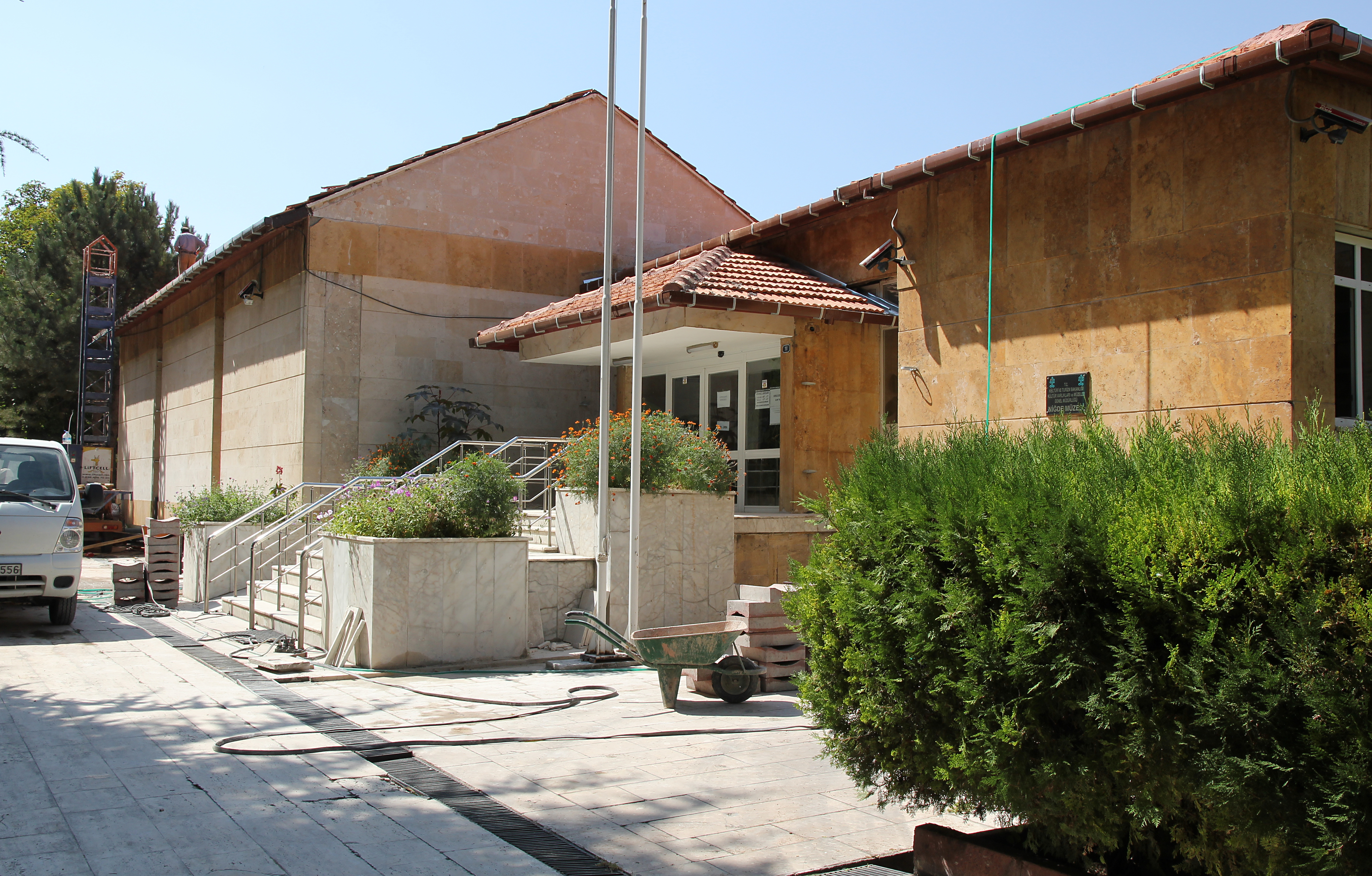
- Niğde Museum front view

- Niğde Archaeological Museum
- Established: 1982; 44 years ago
- Coordinates: 37°58′06″N 34°40′21″E
- Type: Archaeology, Ethnography
- Collections: Hittite, Hellenistic, Roman Empire, Byzantine Empire, Seljuk Empire, Ottoman Empire
- Owner: Ministry of Culture and Tourism

Niğde Archaeological Museum (Turkish: 'Niğde Arkeoloji Müzesi') is located in the centre of the Turkish provincial capital, Niğde between Dışarı Cami Sokak and Öğretmenler Caddesi. It contains objects found at sites in the surrounding area, including the tell of Köşk Höyük and the Graeco-Roman city of Tyana, both in the nearby town of Kemerhisar.

== History ==
From the Second World War until 1950, part of the collection of the Istanbul Archaeological Museum was kept in the Akmedrese, the main Quran school in Niğde, on Ak Medrese Caddesi. The building continued to be used as a museum after that. Because that space ceased to be sufficient for the collection, work began on a new museum building in 1971. The Akmedrese was closed in 1977and the new museum was opened to visitors on 12 November 1982. Soon the collection outgrew this building as well and it was accordingly rebuilt and renovated. The re-opening of the present museum occurred in 2001. The museum is or has been active in excavations at Köşk Höyük, Porsuk Hüyük, Kestel, Göllü Dağ, Andaval, Eskigümüş and Kınık Höyük.

== Collection ==
The museum's collection includes material displayed chronologically. Room 1 contains Stone Age artefacts, including obsidian spearpoints and arrowheads from Göllü Dağ, Köşk Höyük, Pınarbaşı Gölü, Kaletepe, and other locations, which date back to the 12th millennium BC. A large number of Neolithic and Chalcolithic ceramic objects (6th and 5th millennia BC) are also displayed, most of which come from the excavations at Köşk Höyük. There is also a reconstruction of a house from this settlement.

Room 2 contains objects from the Early Bronze Age (3rd millennium BC) from Göltepe and the Kestel tin mines, as well as Middle Bronze Age pottery from the Assyrian trade colonies at Acemhöyük, near Çamardı.

In Room 3 are stelai and other objects from the Neo-Hittite/Luwian period. These are associated with the Hittite cities of the Nahita (Niğde) and Tuwanuwa (Kemerhisar) and the Neo-Hittite successor state of Tuwana. They include the Niğde Stele, which depicts the weather god Tahrhunzas and bears an inscription recording its dedication by Muwaharanis, son of Warpalawas, the king of Tuwana at the end of the 8th century BC. A second stele from Keşlik, c. 30 km west of Niğde, near Altunhisar, shows the weather god in a similar way, but its inscription is no longer legible. Also on display is a plaster cast of the Andaval Stele, found at Andaval (modern Aktaş), northeast of Niğde, which mentions Warpalawas, as well as other Luwian hieroglyphic inscriptions from Porsuk and Veliisa. The room also holds a pair of Neo-Hittite door lions from Göllü Dağ, as well as pottery, bronzes, and other small objects of the Phrygian period from Porsuk and elsewhere.

Room 4 contains objects from the Greco-Roman period, mostly from Tyana. Among these are inscriptions, statues, reliefs, terracotta and marble sarcophagi, small finds, and pottery. At the entrance to Room 5 is a smaller room with coins from the Hellenistic, Roman, Byzantine, and Islamic periods.

Rooms 5 and 6 are devoted to mediaeval and modern material. Room 5 contains the mummies of a woman and four children, which were found in the Yılanlı church in the Ihlara Valley and date to the 10th century AD. Room 6 has an ethnographic display with books, carpets, weapons, and traditional costumes.

== Gallery ==
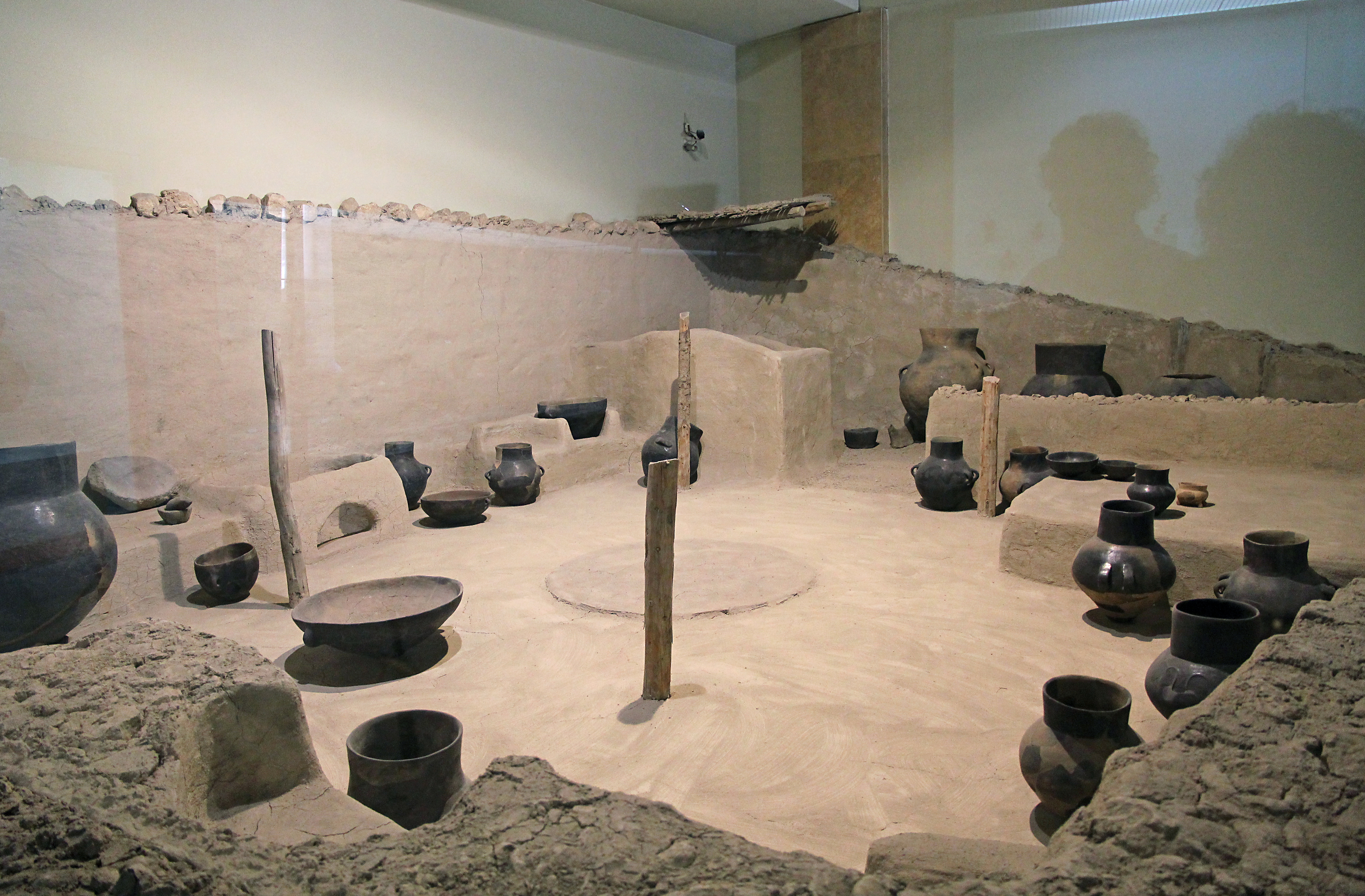
Reconstruction of a house from Köşk Höyük

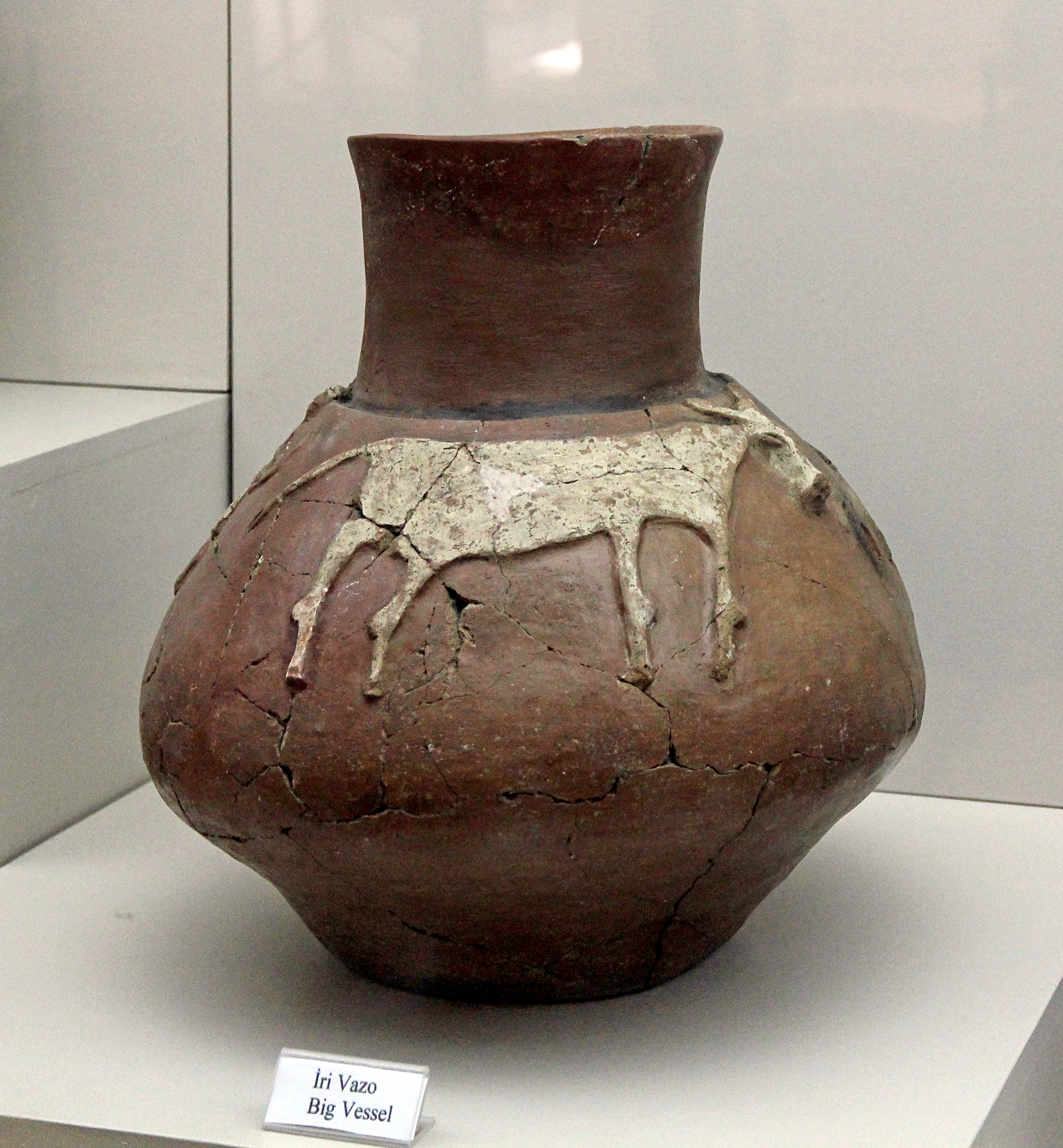
Animal vase from Köşk Höyük

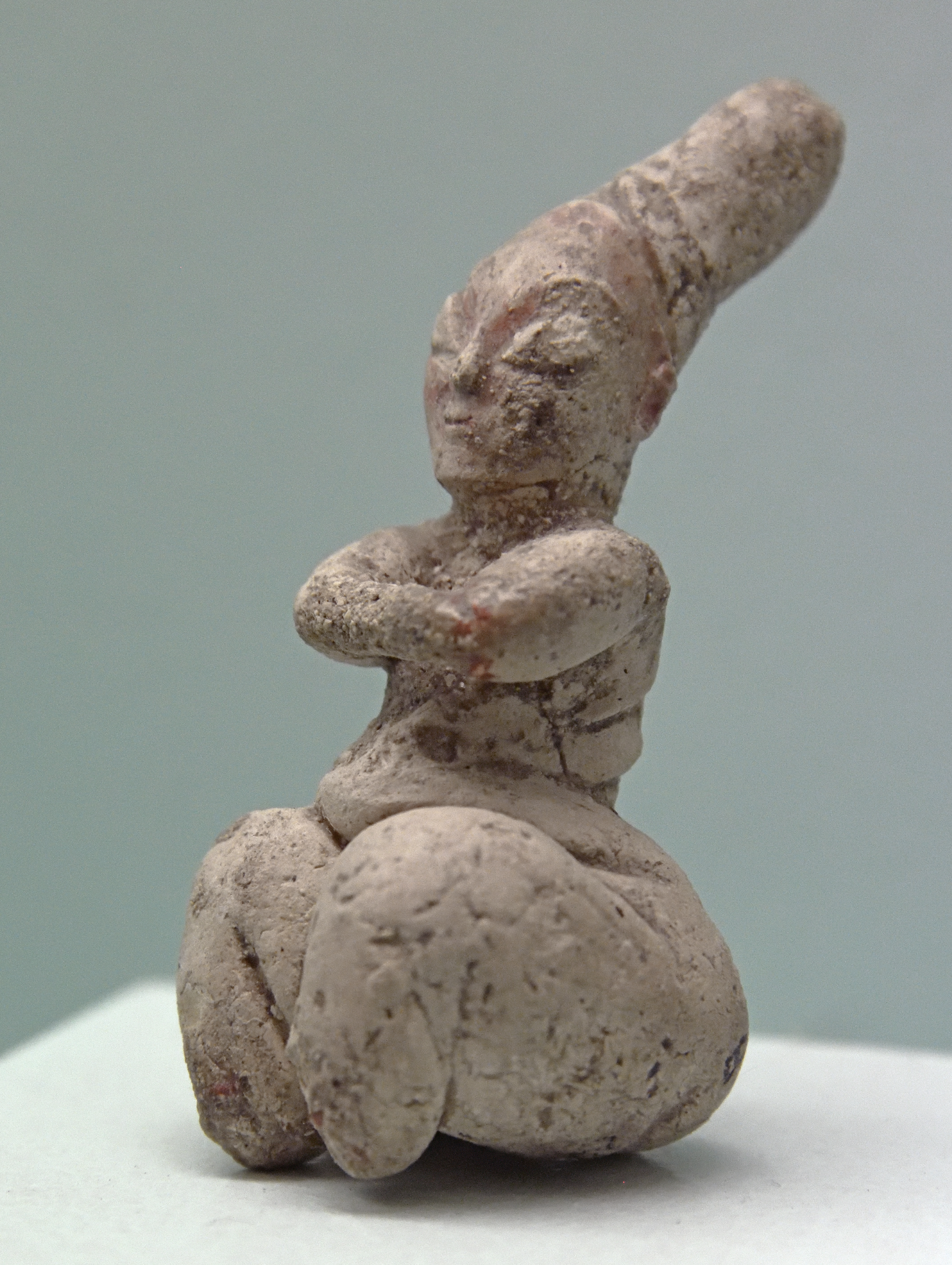
Goddess from Köşk Höyük

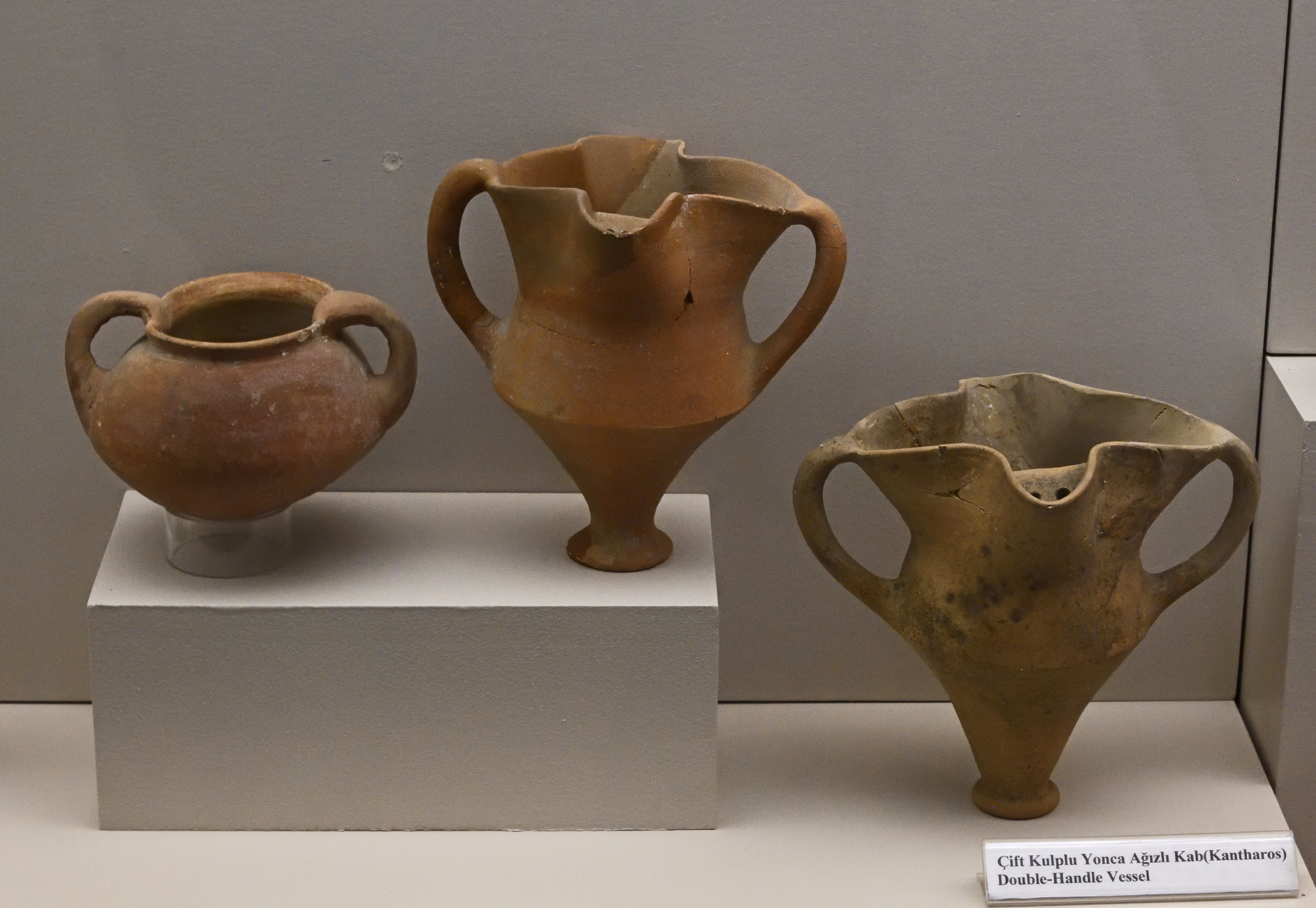
Pottery from Assyrian colony at Acemhöyük

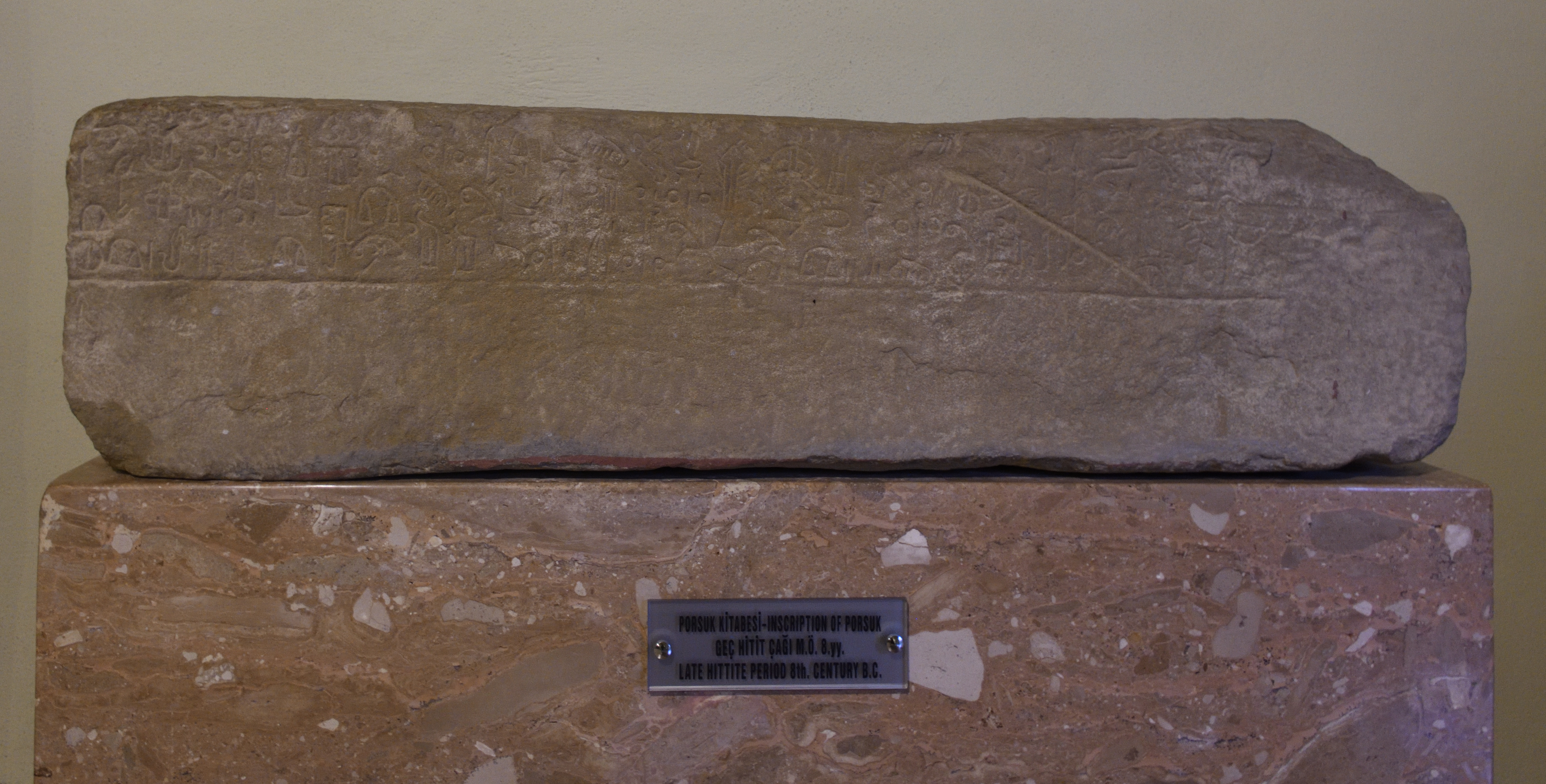
Luwian inscription from Porsuk

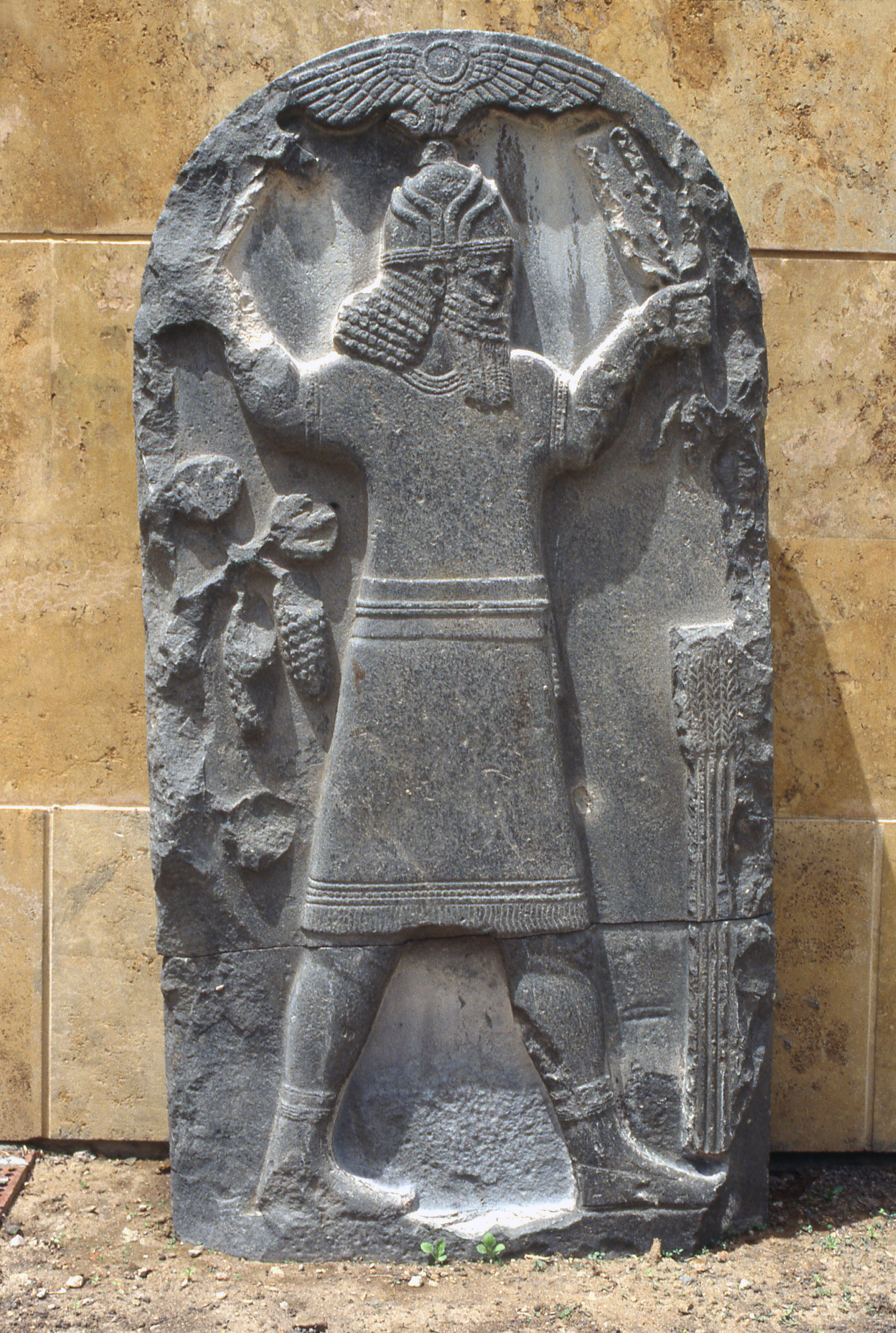
Neo-Hittite stele from Niğde

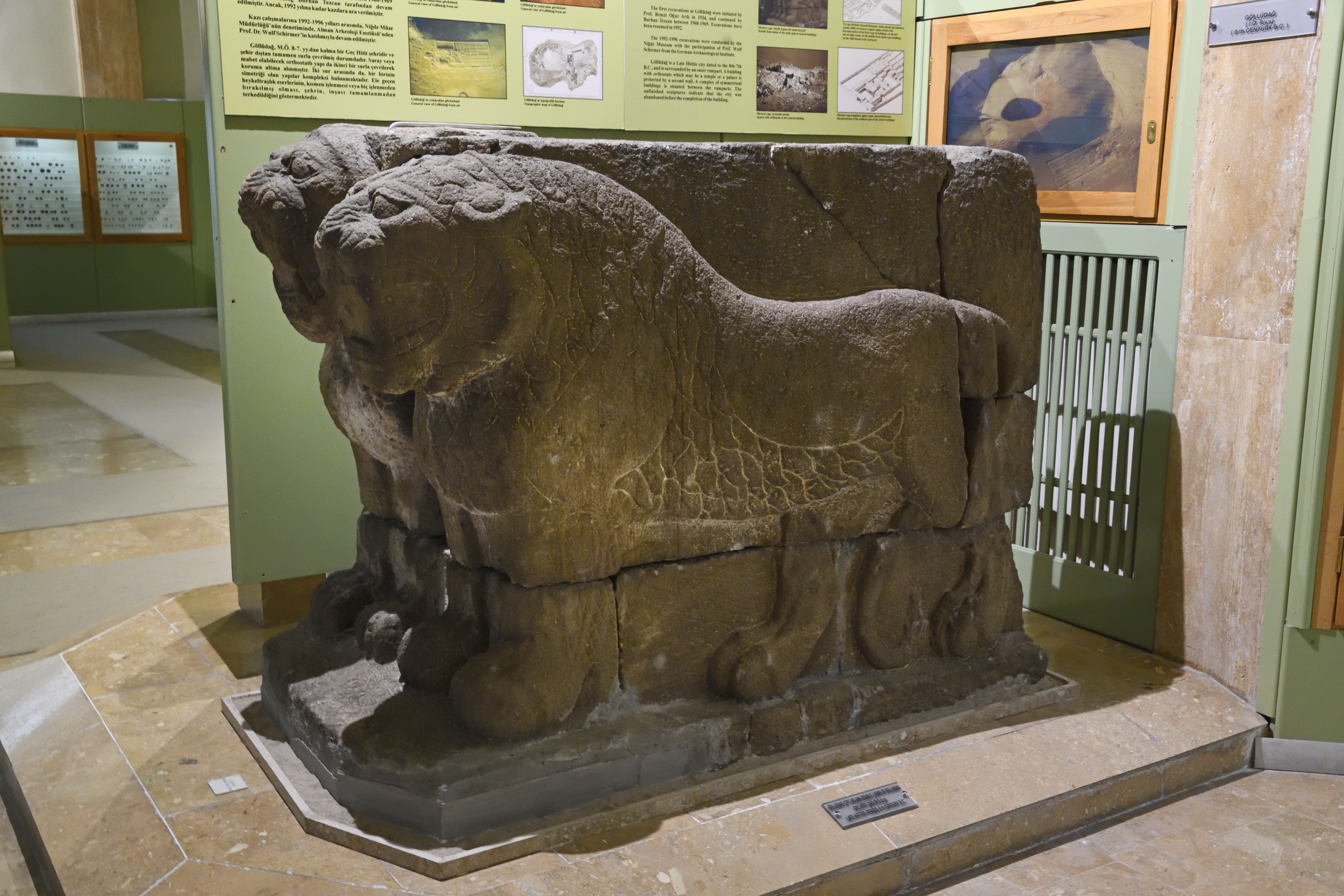
Neo-Hittite lions from Göllü Dağ

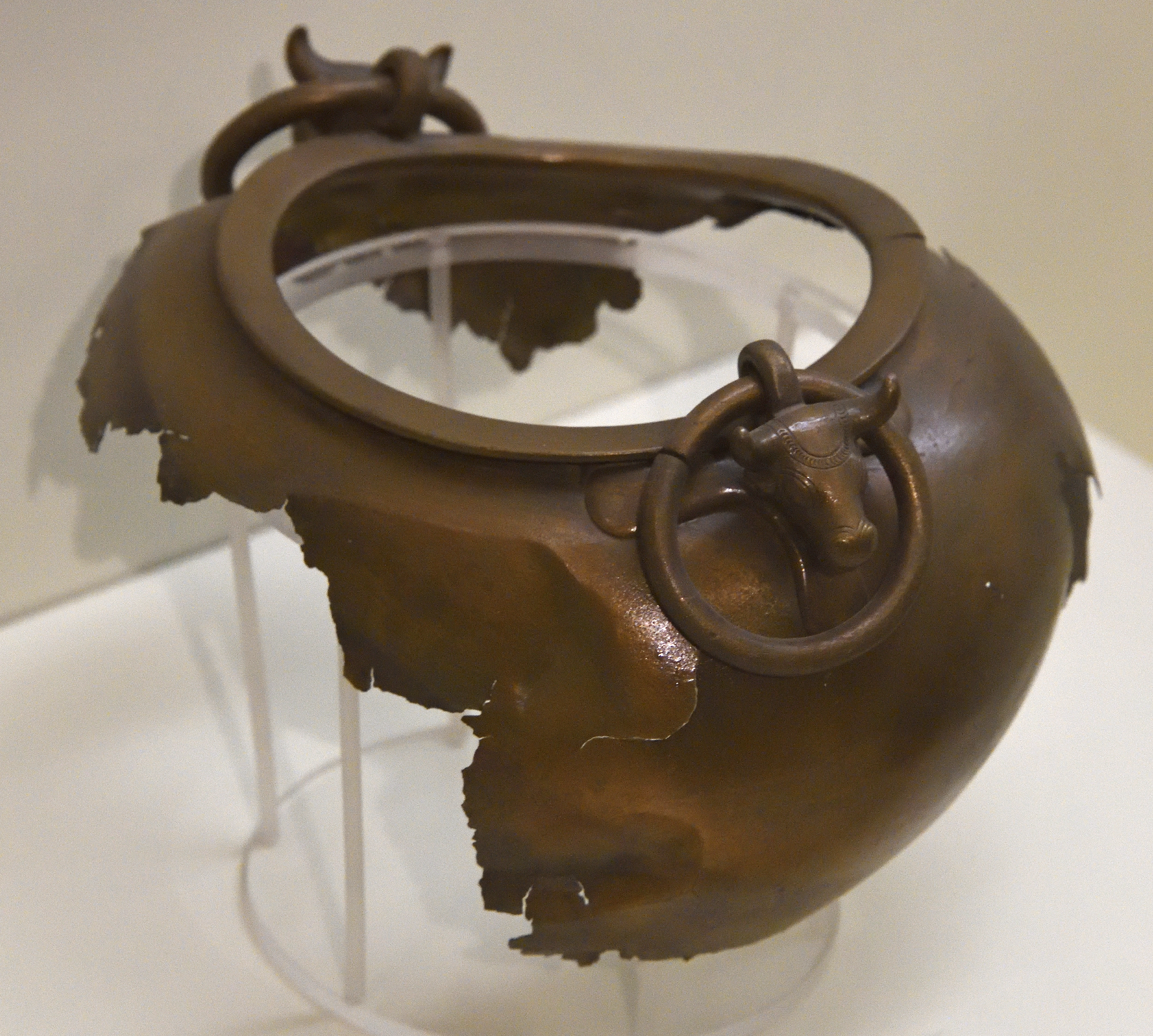
Phyrgian bronze cauldron

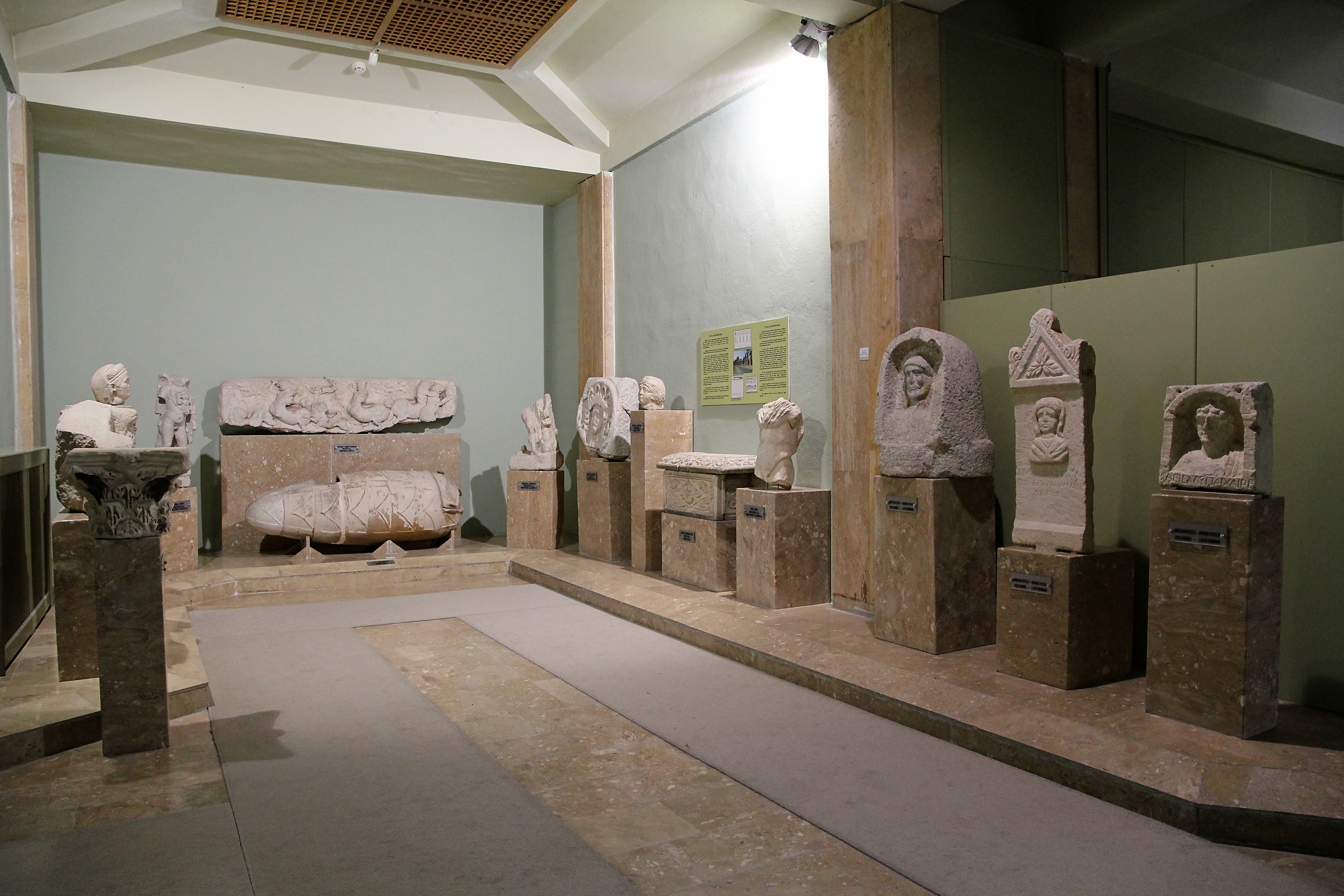
Roman sculpture from Tyana

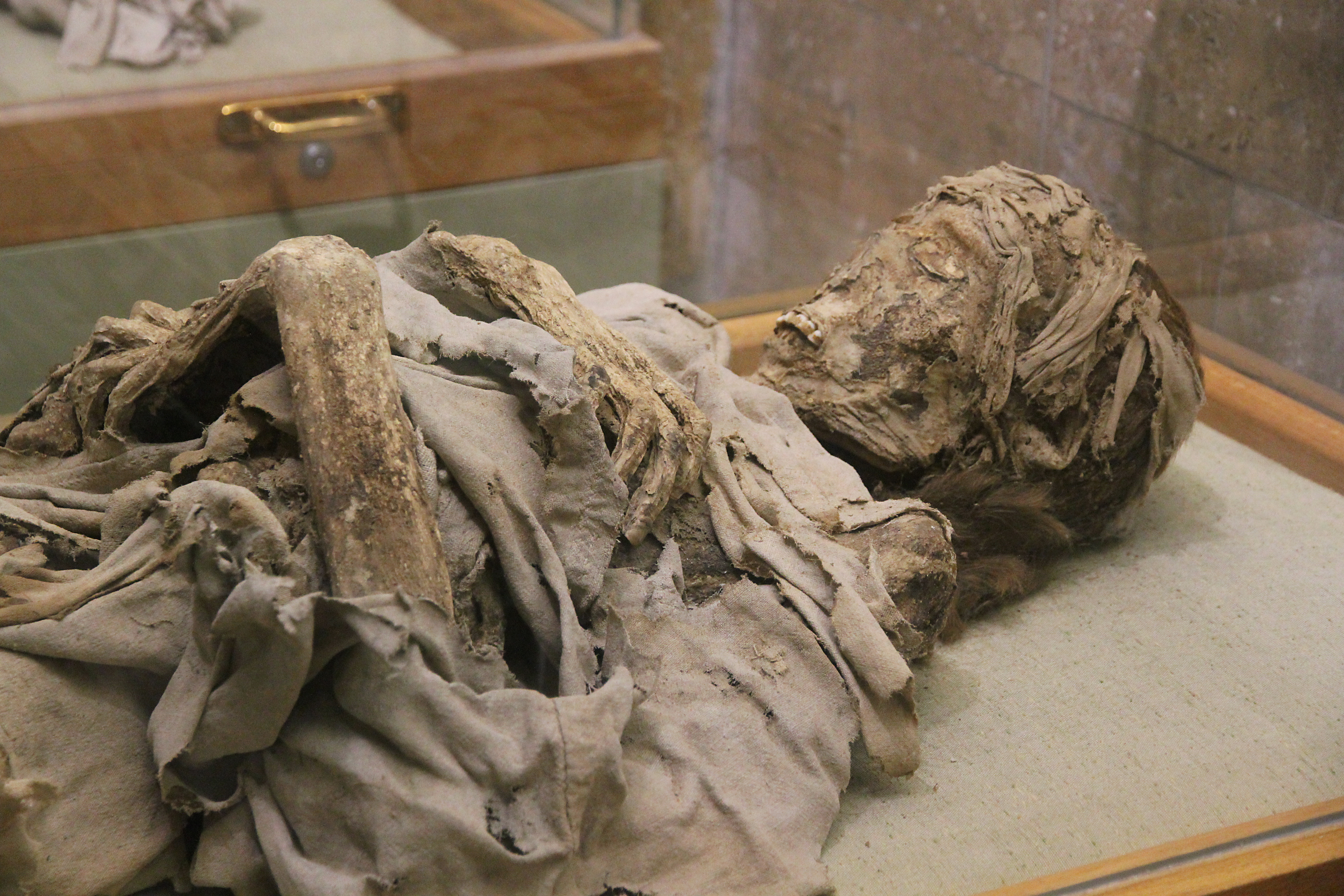
Niğde Museum: mummy thought to be of 1000-year-old nun

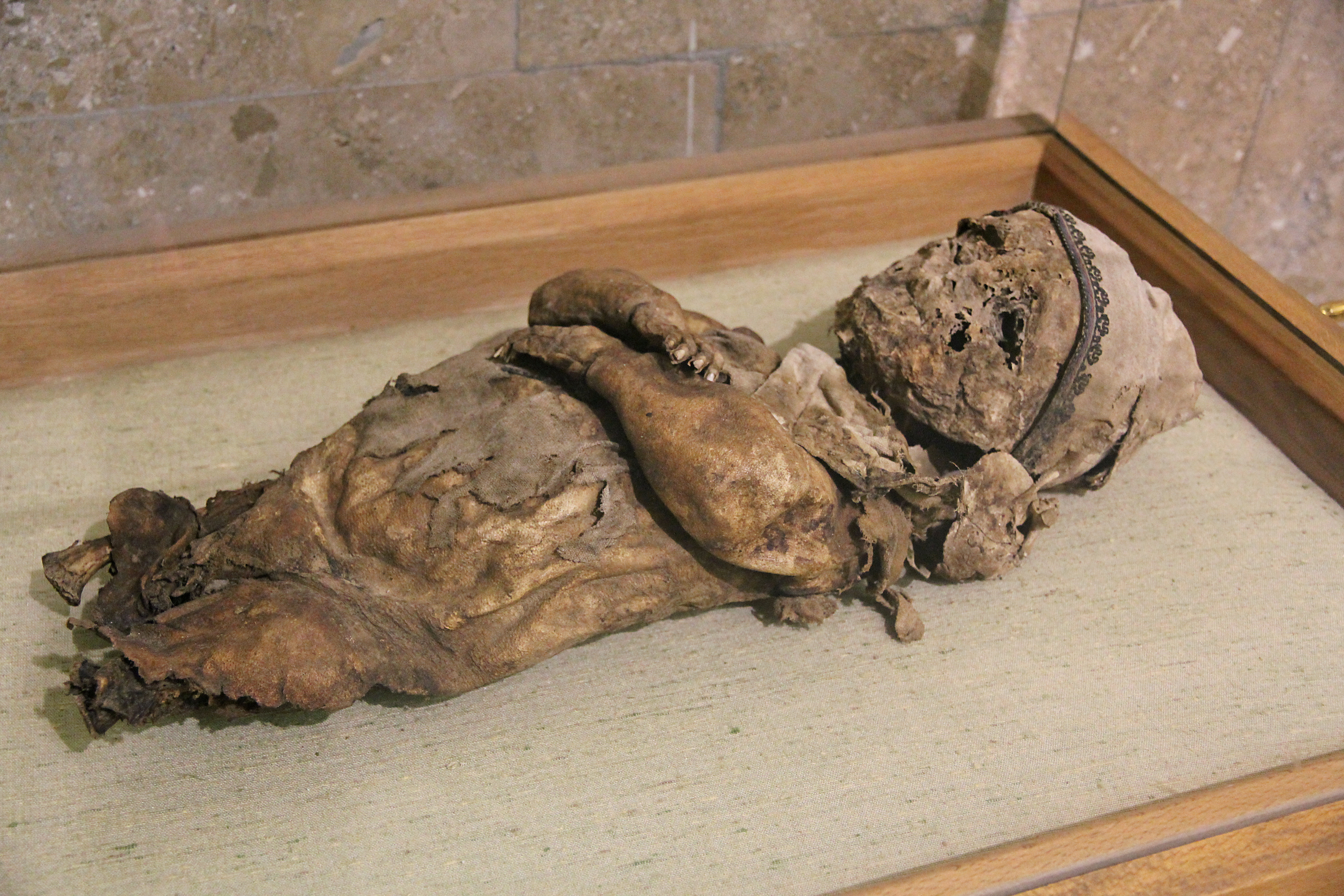
Mummy of a Byzantine child from the Ihlara Valley
