= Əyridərə =

Human settlement in Azerbaijan

Coordinates: 40°43′N 45°25′E

Əyridərə is a village in the municipality of Hacılar in the Gadabay Rayon of Azerbaijan.
