= Bozalqanlı (Boz Bozalganly) =

- Location within Azerbaijan
- Coordinates: 40°59′34″N 45°38′32″E
- Country: Azerbaijan
- Rayon: Tovuz
- Time zone: UTC+4 (AZT)
  - Summer (DST): UTC+5 (AZT)

Bozalqanlı (also, Boz Bozalganly and Boz-Bozanganly) is a village in the Tovuz Rayon of Azerbaijan.
