= Keymərəz =

- Location within Azerbaijan
- Coordinates: 41°25′13″N 48°54′32″E
- Country: Azerbaijan
- Rayon: Khachmaz
- Municipality: Qalağan
- Time zone: UTC+4 (AZT)
  - Summer (DST): UTC+5 (AZT)

Keymərəz (also, Keimaraz and Keymuraz) is a village in the Khachmaz Rayon of Azerbaijan. The village forms part of the municipality of Qalağan.
