= Bozalqanlı (Bozalganly) =

- Municipality
- Location within Azerbaijan
- Coordinates: 40°59′46″N 45°38′21″E
- Country: Azerbaijan
- Rayon: Tovuz

Population
  - Total: 3,861
- Time zone: UTC+4 (AZT)
  - Summer (DST): UTC+5 (AZT)

Bozalqanlı (also, Bozalganly and Bozalkanly) is a village and municipality in the Tovuz Rayon of Azerbaijan. It has a population of 3,861.
