= Köşk Höyük =

Archaeological site in Turkey

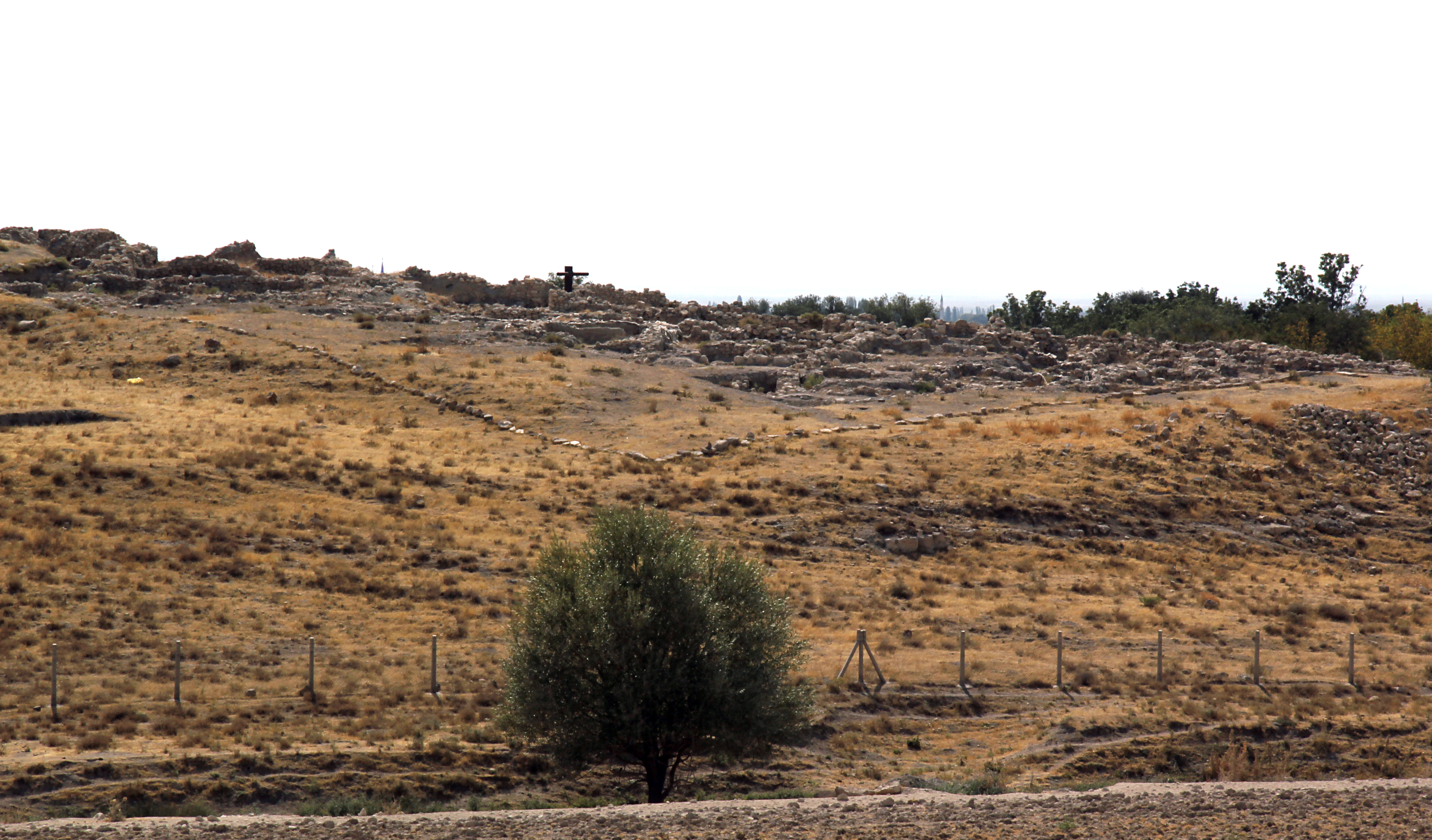

- Location within Turkey
- Interactive map of Köşk Höyük
- 37°50′51.00″N 34°36′44.00″E
- Type: Settlement
- Location: Nigde, Turkey

History
- Built: c. 6000 BC
- Abandoned: c. 4900 BC

Site notes
- Discovered: 1961 by M. Ballance

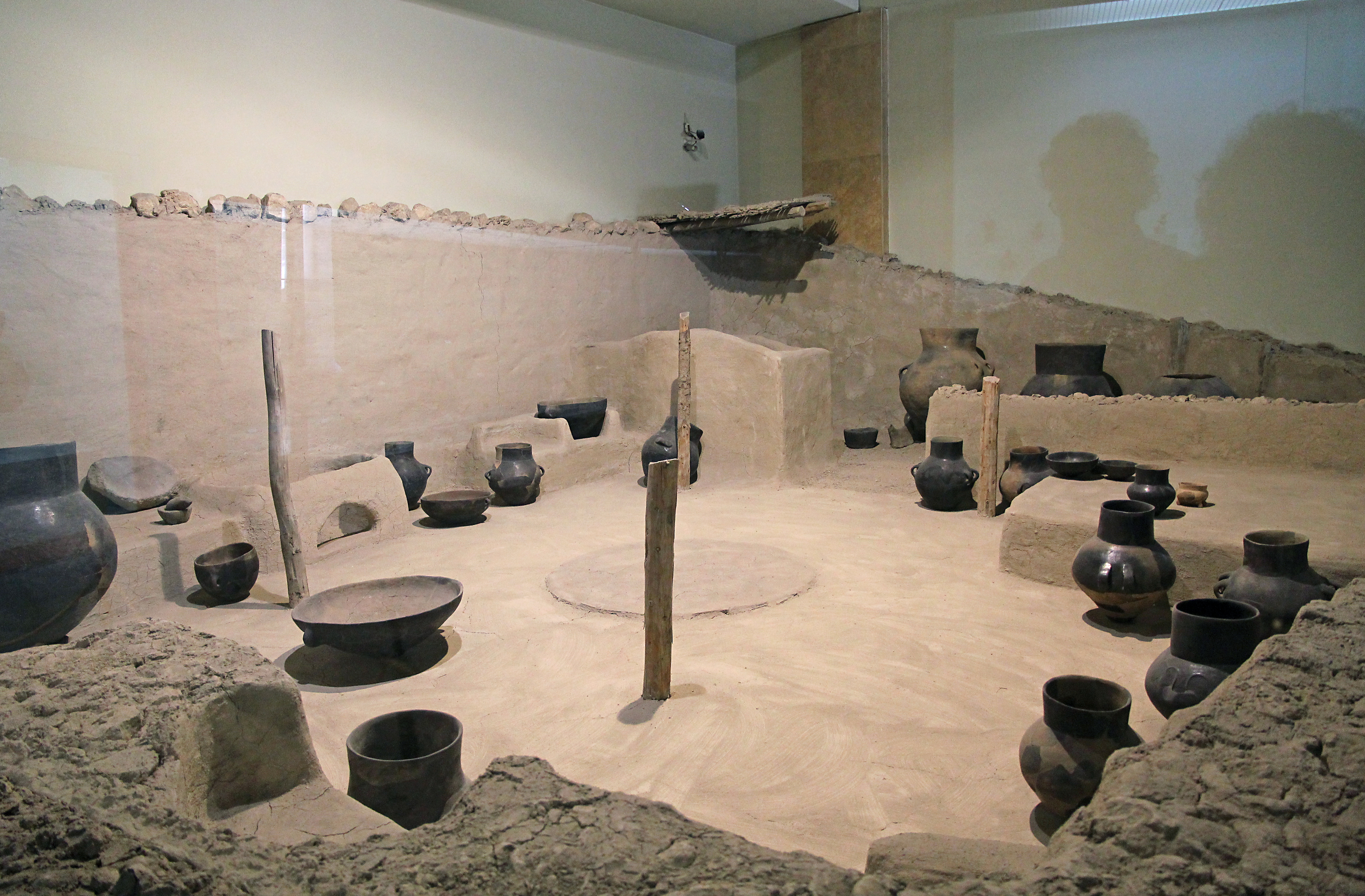
Reconstruction of a house from Köşk Höyük in the Niğde Archaeological Museum

Köşk Höyük is a tell northeast of Bahçeli, near Kemerhisar (the ancient city of Tyana) in the modern Niğde Province of Turkey. It is located on the Bor Plateau, south of Mount Hasan near a spring.

== Description ==
The site is a limestone hill, which had already been turned into terraces for settlement purposes in the Neolithic. This settlement had an area of around 100 90 metres and left behind some 6 metres of strata. The uppermost layer (I) dates to the early Chalcolithic (c. 5000-4750 BC), while the layers below this (II-V) belong to the Neolithic period and have been dated by radio carbon dating to 6300-5600 BC.

In the upper, Chalcolithic layer, a workshop with a furnace for copper-working was discovered. In all the Neolithic layers, the houses have a trapezoidal or quadrilateral floor plan with between two and four rooms. These houses contain, at least, a clay platform and a fireplace, with storage containers in almost every room. Several buildings had out-buildings attached to them. The houses were joined together in blocks with a narrow, angular street network and a number of open areas running between them. A wall-painting in Layer III (6000-5600 BC) shows a hunting scene.

== Burials ==
Tombs are known from Layers III and II. Children and babies were buried in the houses under the floor, while adults were interred outside the settlement. Without exception, the dead were arranged in the fetal position and buried with grave goods.

Some skulls were covered with clay or plaster, painted red or black, and displayed on the aforementioned clay platforms. These are the earliest individual moulded skulls in Anatolia, along with those from Çatalhöyük. The practice of plastered human skulls is widespread in the Pre-Pottery Neolithic B Levant, with examples known from Jericho and 'Ain Ghazal. In total, eleven of these skulls have been investigated anthropologically at Köşk Höyük. One of them belonged to a child, the rest to adults (two men, three women, five of indeterminate sex). Young adults predominate. Traces of cutting are absent, which means that the skulls were only removed after the flesh had decomposed, then plastered and painted. Kş 1990:1 has impressions of reed matting. The child's skull (Kş 1985) was found in Layer III and provides important evidence in the debate about whether these skulls indicate veneration of the dead.

== Finds ==
Both in the habitations and the graves, figurines of fired clay and stone were found. The male figurines are shown with clothing and head-coverings, while female figurines are naked.

The pottery of Köşk Höyük is monochrome with a polished surface. A few vessels are in the shape of animals or people. One vessel is painted and decorated with relief. Among the obsidian finds there are some blade cores, worn out be regular use.

Layers I and II in Kösk Höyük show parallelisms with Çatalhöyük West, and with the Early Chalcolithic at Hacilar.

== Research history ==
Köşk Höyük was discovered in 1961 by M. Ballance. It was investigated again in 1964 by R. Harper and M. Ramsden. The first excavations were undertaken by Uğur Silistreli of the University of Ankara between 1981 and his death in 1991. Since 1995, Aliye Öztan and Süleyman Özkan have been leading excavations of the site.

The finds from the site are on display in the Niğde Archaeological Museum, along with a reconstruction of a room from a house at Köşk Höyük.

== Bibliography ==
- Aliye Öztan, 2002. "Köşk Höyük: Anadolu Arkeolojisine Yeni Katkılar." TÜBA-AR 5, 55–69.
- Aliye Öztan: "Köşk Höyük." In Die ältesten Monumente der Menschheit. Vor 12.000 Jahren in Anatolien. Karlsruhe 2007, p. 129. ISBN 978-3-937345-17-8.
- Aliye Öztan 2007. "Köşk Höyük: Niğde-Bor Ovasında bir Yerleşim," in Mehmet Özdoğan, Nezih Başgelen (ed.), Türkiye’de Neolitik Dönem. İstanbul: Arkeoloji ve Sanat Yayınları, 223–235.
- Uğur Silistreli, "Pınarbaşı ve Köşk Höyükleri." Kazı Sonuçları Toplantısı 5, 1984, 81–85.
