= Dondarlı, Tovuz =

Dondarlı
- Location within Azerbaijan
- Coordinates: 40°42′54″N 45°43′00″E
- Country: Azerbaijan
- Rayon: Tovuz
- Municipality: Sarıtala
- Time zone: UTC+4 (AZT)
  - Summer (DST): UTC+5 (AZT)

Dondarlı (also, Dondarly) is a village in the Tovuz Rayon of Azerbaijan. The village forms part of the municipality of Sarıtala.
