= Məmmədcəfərli =

Human settlement in Azerbaijan

- Village
- Location in Azerbaijan
- Coordinates: 40°42′54″N 45°25′12″E

Məmmədcəfərli is a village in the municipality of Hacılar in the Gadabay Rayon of Azerbaijan.
