= Çeşməli, Tovuz =

Çeşməli
- Municipality
- Location within Azerbaijan
- Coordinates: 40°41′45″N 45°34′04″E
- Country: Azerbaijan
- Rayon: Tovuz

Population
  - Total: 849
- Time zone: UTC+4 (AZT)
  - Summer (DST): UTC+5 (AZT)

Çeşməli (also, Çeşməlı, Cheshmali, and Chirkinli) is a village and municipality in the Tovuz Rayon of Azerbaijan. It has a population of 849. The municipality consists of the villages of Çeşməli and Abbasqulular.
