= Aşağı Quşçu =

Ashaghy Gushchu
- Municipality
- Azerbaijani: Aşağı Quşçu
- Location within Azerbaijan
- Coordinates: 40°57′12″N 45°40′45″E
- Country: Azerbaijan
- District: Tovuz

Population
  - Total: 8,702
- Time zone: UTC+4 (AZT)
  - Summer (DST): UTC+5 (AZT)

Aşağı Quşçu (also, Ashaghy Gushchu) is a village and municipality in the Tovuz District of Azerbaijan. It has a population of 8,702.
