= Sonalar =

- Village
- Location within Azerbaijan
- Coordinates: 40°42′N 45°26′E
- Country: Azerbaijan
- Rayon: Gadabay
- Municipality: Hacılar
- Time zone: UTC+4 (AZT)

Sonalar is a village in the municipality of Hacılar in the Gadabay Rayon of Azerbaijan.
