= Veliisa Stele =

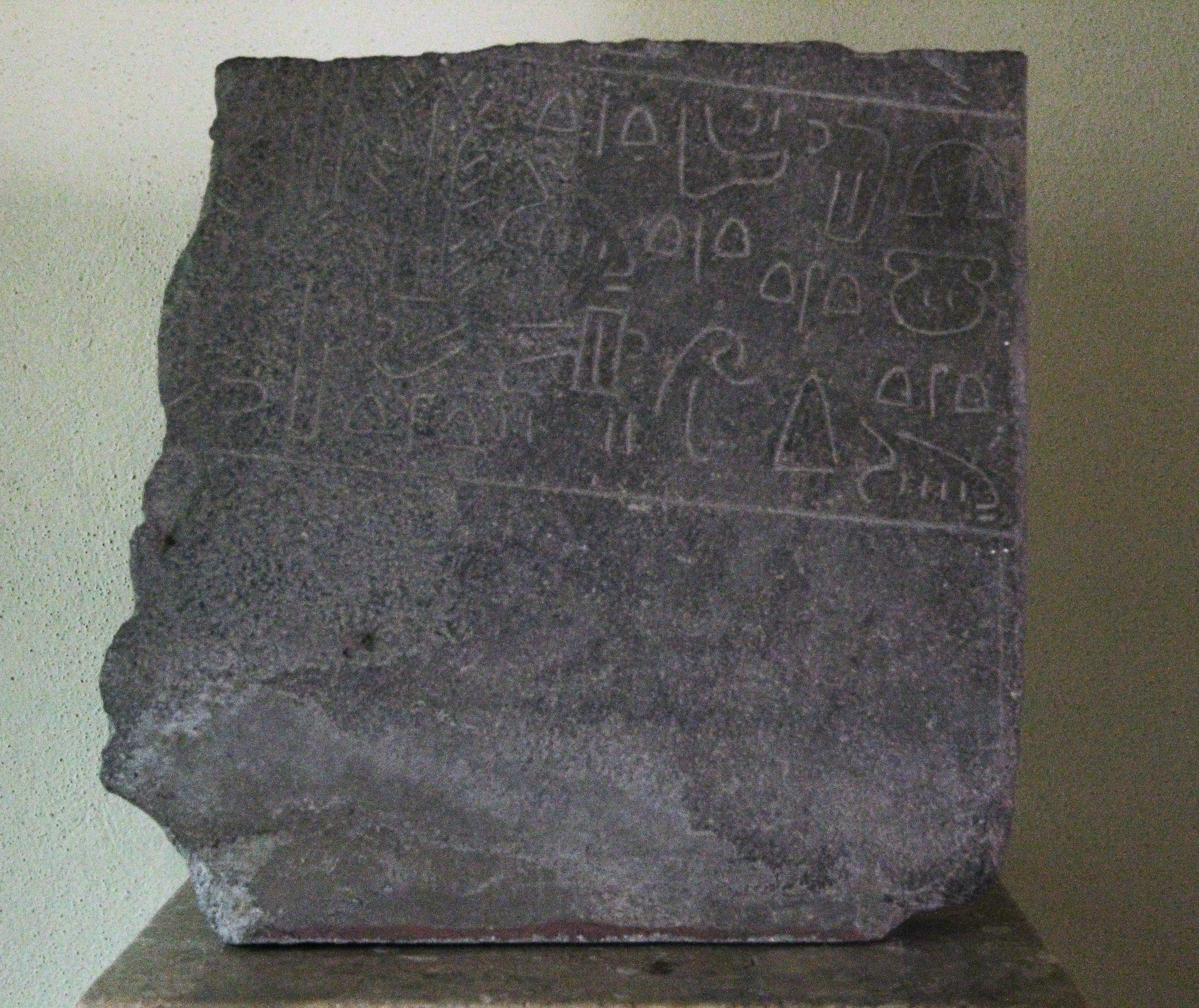
- Material: Basalt
- Height: 43 cm
- Width: 44 cm
- Created: c. 750 BC
- Discovered: before 1955
- Present location: Nigde, Nigde Province, Turkey

The Veliisa Stele is a fragment of a Luwian hieroglyphic inscription of Neo-Hittite date. It is on display in the Niğde Archaeological Museum, where its inventory number is 53.

== Description ==
The grey basalt stone has a vaguely triangular cross-section. From the two surfaces on the reverse of the stone and vertical centre line between them it is believed that slightly more than half of the original stele has survived. The surviving stone represents the bottom part of the original stele. The fragment has a height of 43 cm and a width of 44 cm. The maximum depth is 20 cm. On the upper half of the well-preserved front face, deeply cut hieroglyphic letters can be read.

Hawkins gives the translation of the text as follows:

[Tarhun]zas came well for me, and for me [ he did] all good...

Based on the shape and the style of the script, Hawkins placed the document in the late 8th century BC. The findspot places the stele within the Iron Age Luwian kingdom of Tuwana.

== Discovery & Publication ==
The exact find situation of the fragment is not known. The original publication by the Polish-American Assyrologist Ignace Gelb only says that the fragment was found at Veliisa (now called Yaylayolu), 15 km north of Niğde in the central district of Niğde province, on the eastern slopes of Melendiz Dağı. The German archaeologist Helmuth Theodor Bossert published the first translation of the inscription in 1954. Another edition was produced by Piero Meriggi in 1975. The Hittitologist John David Hawkins produced a new translation in 2000 for his Corpus of Hieroglyphic Luwian Inscriptions.

== Bibliography ==
- Dietrich Berges, Johannes Nollé. Tyana - Archäologisch-historische Untersuchungen zum südwestlichen Kappadokien. Habelt, Bonn 2000, ISBN 3-7749-2959-9 pp. 106.
- John David Hawkins. Corpus of Hieroglyphic Luwian Inscriptions. Vol. I: Inscriptions of the Iron Age. Part 2: Text. Amuq, Aleppo, Hama, Tabal, Assur Letters, Miscellaneous, Seals, Indices. (= Studies in Indo-European Language and Culture 8). de Gruyter, Berlin. 2000, ISBN 3-11-010864-X. p. 529 No. X.49 Tab. 303.
