= Abbasqulular, Tovuz =

Abbasqulular
- Location within Azerbaijan
- Coordinates: 40°41′N 45°34′E
- Country: Azerbaijan
- Rayon: Tovuz
- Municipality: Çeşməli
- Time zone: UTC+4 (AZT)
  - Summer (DST): UTC+5 (AZT)

Abbasqulular (also, Abbaskullar) is a village in the Tovuz Rayon of Azerbaijan. The village forms part of the municipality of Çeşməli.
