= Qaravəlilər =

- Location within Azerbaijan
- Coordinates: 40°43′43″N 45°25′43″E
- Country: Azerbaijan
- Rayon: Gadabay
- Municipality: Hacılar
- Time zone: UTC+4 (AZT)
  - Summer (DST): UTC+5 (AZT)

Qaravəlilər (also, Qaravəllilər and Qaravəllər) is a village in the Gadabay Rayon of Azerbaijan. The village forms part of the municipality of Hacılar.
