= Qoşa =

Village in Azerbaijan

Coordinates: 40°47′N 45°34′E

Qoşa is a village in the municipality of Çatax in the Tovuz Rayon of Azerbaijan.
