= Hacılı, Barda =

Hacılı
- Municipality
- Location within Azerbaijan Location within Karabakh Economic Region
- Coordinates: 40°24′N 47°01′E
- Country: Azerbaijan
- Rayon: Barda

Population
  - Total: 442
- Time zone: UTC+4 (AZT)
  - Summer (DST): UTC+5 (AZT)

Hacılı (also, Gadzhyly) is a village and municipality in the Barda Rayon of Azerbaijan. It has a population of 442.
