= Qalağan =

- Municipality
- Location within Azerbaijan
- Coordinates: 41°25′06″N 48°53′10″E
- Country: Azerbaijan
- Rayon: Khachmaz

Population
  - Total: 977
- Time zone: UTC+4 (AZT)
  - Summer (DST): UTC+5 (AZT)

Qalağan, also known as Qalaqan or Kalagan, is a village and municipality in the Khachmaz Rayon of Azerbaijan. It has a population of 977. The municipality consists of the villages of Qalağan, Keymərəz, and Hacılar.
