= Abbasqulular, Goranboy =

Coordinates: 40.608°N 46.789°E

Abbasqulular is a village and municipality in the Goranboy Rayon of Azerbaijan. It has a population of 495.
