= Kallehgan, Kerman =

Kallehgan كله گان
- Village
- Location within Iran
- Coordinates: 26°47′55″N 58°48′12″E
- Country: Iran
- Province: Kerman
- County: Qaleh Ganj
- Bakhsh: Chah Dadkhoda
- Rural District: Rameshk

Population (2006)
  - Total: 41
- Time zone: UTC+3:30 (IRST)
  - Summer (DST): UTC+4:30 (IRDT)

Kallehgan (Persian: كله گان, also Romanized as Kallehgān; also known as Kalagan and Qal‘eh Khān) is a village in Rameshk Rural District, Chah Dadkhoda District, Qaleh Ganj County, Kerman Province, Iran. At the 2006 census, its population was 41, in 11 families.
