= Çeşməli, Shaki =

Coordinates: 41°07′55″N 47°09′07″E

Çeşməli is a village and municipality in the Shaki City Territorial unit of Azerbaijan. It has a population of 465.
