= Hacılı, Shamakhi =

Hacılı
- Municipality
- Location within Azerbaijan
- Coordinates: 40°44′09″N 48°43′33″E
- Country: Azerbaijan
- Rayon: Shamakhi

Population
  - Total: 337
- Time zone: UTC+4 (AZT)
  - Summer (DST): UTC+5 (AZT)

Hacılı (also, Khodzhaly and Otsëlok Khodzhali) is a village and municipality in the Shamakhi Rayon of Azerbaijan. It has a population of 337.
