= Dondarlı, Qubadli =

Dondarlı
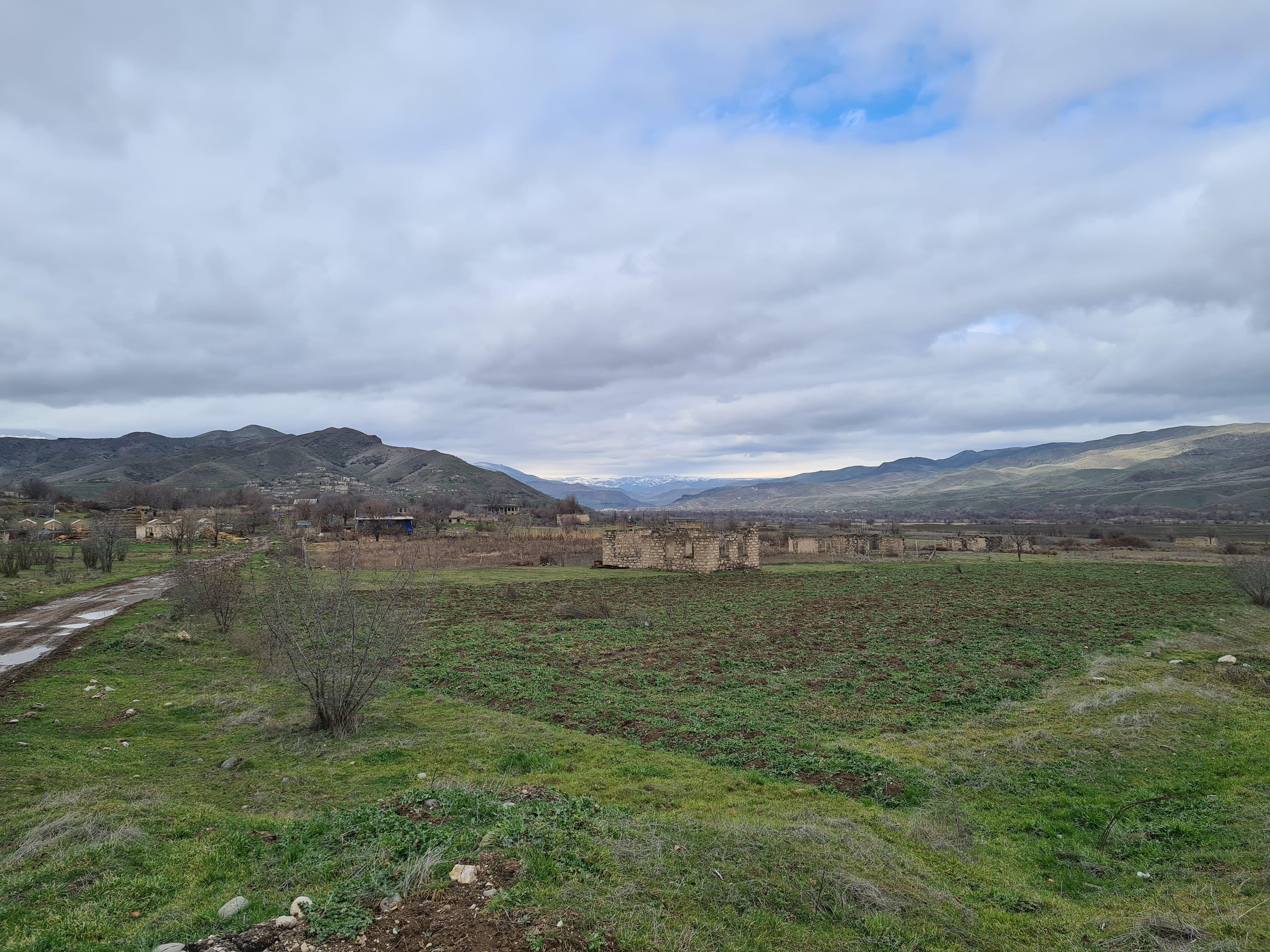
- Ruined homes in the village following three decades of Armenian occupation

- Location within Azerbaijan
- Coordinates: 39°18′20″N 46°36′32″E
- Country: Azerbaijan
- District: Qubadli
- Time zone: UTC+4 (AZT)

Dondarlı (Dondarly) is a village in the Qubadli District of Azerbaijan.

== Gallery ==
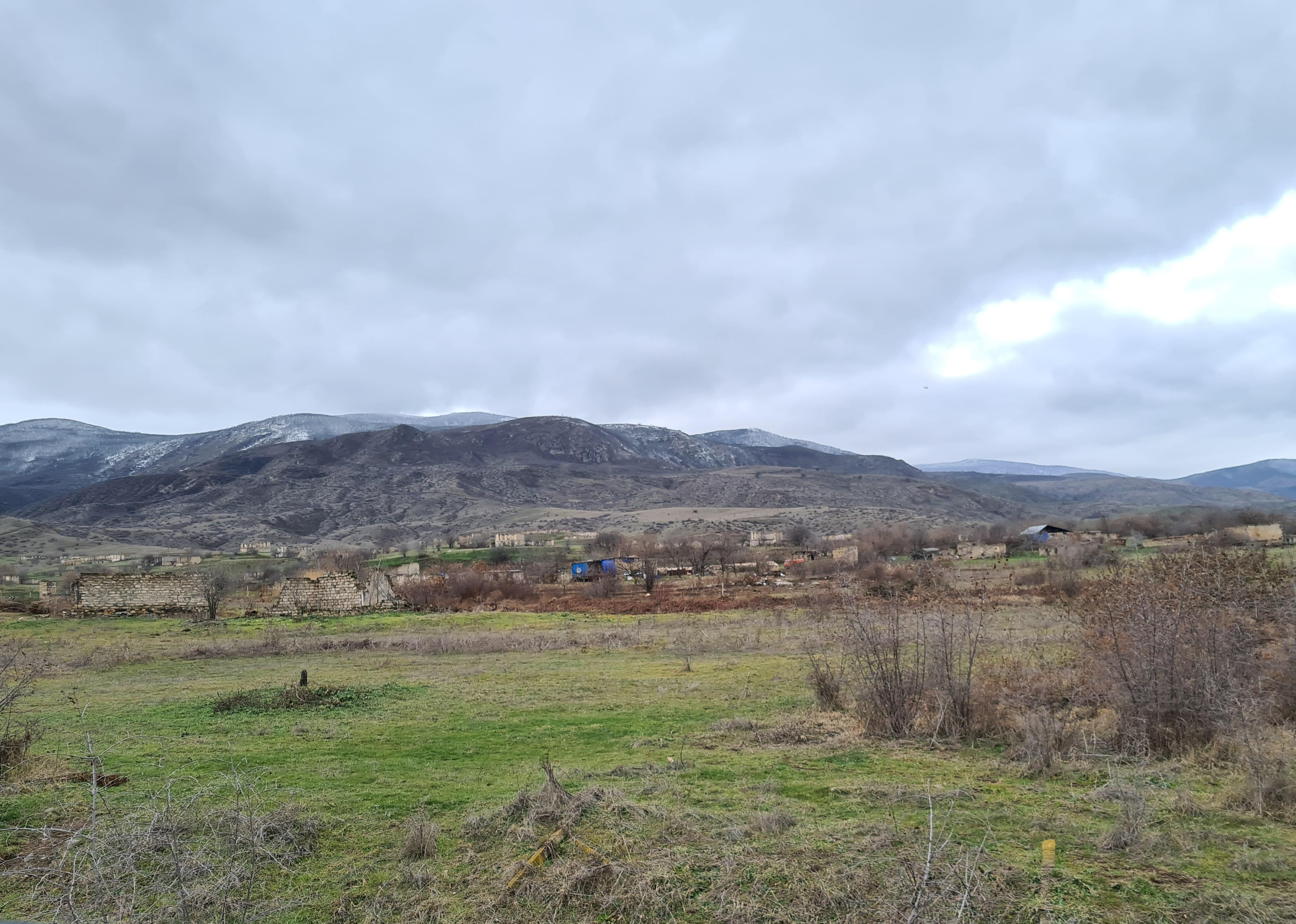

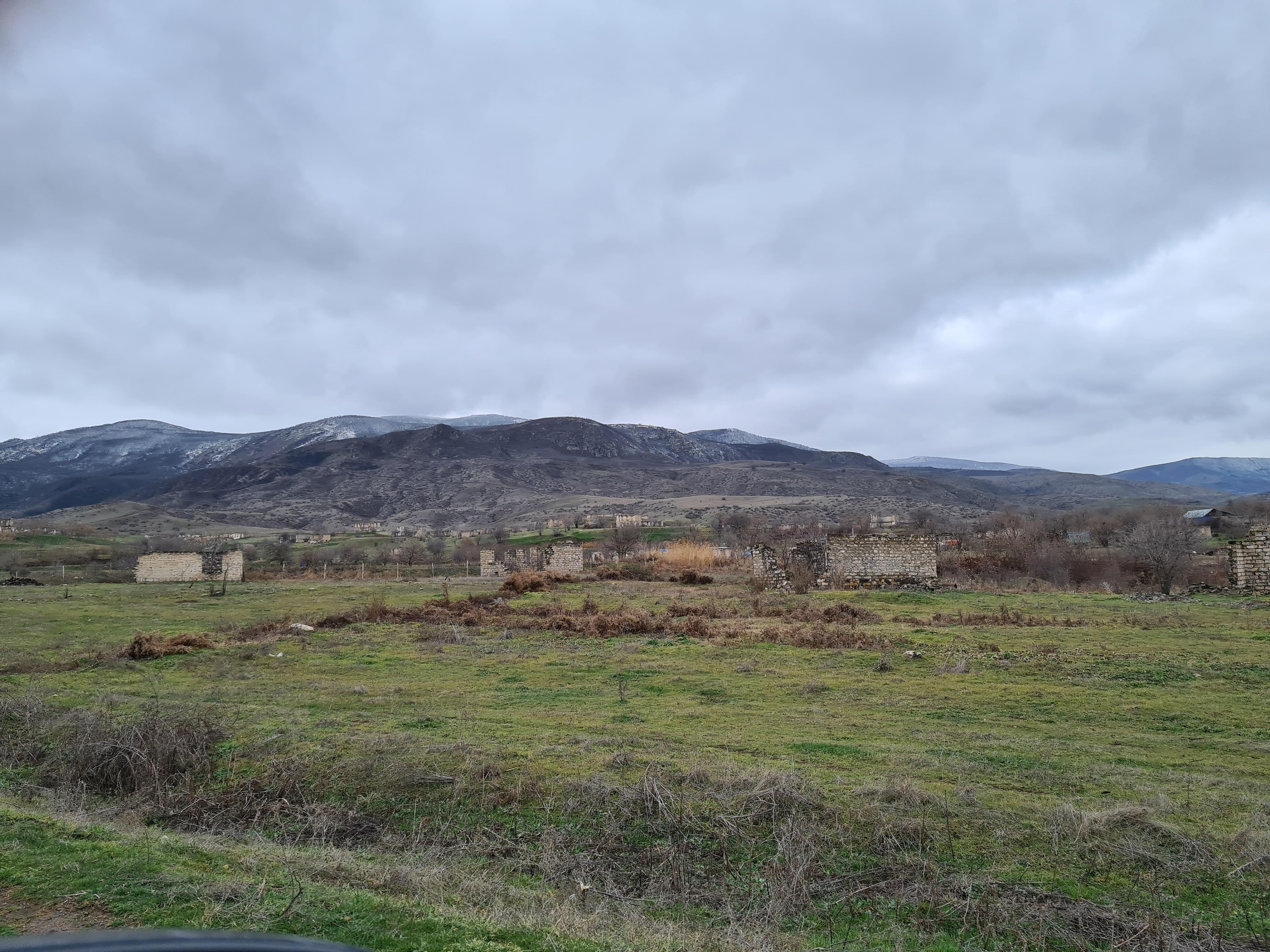

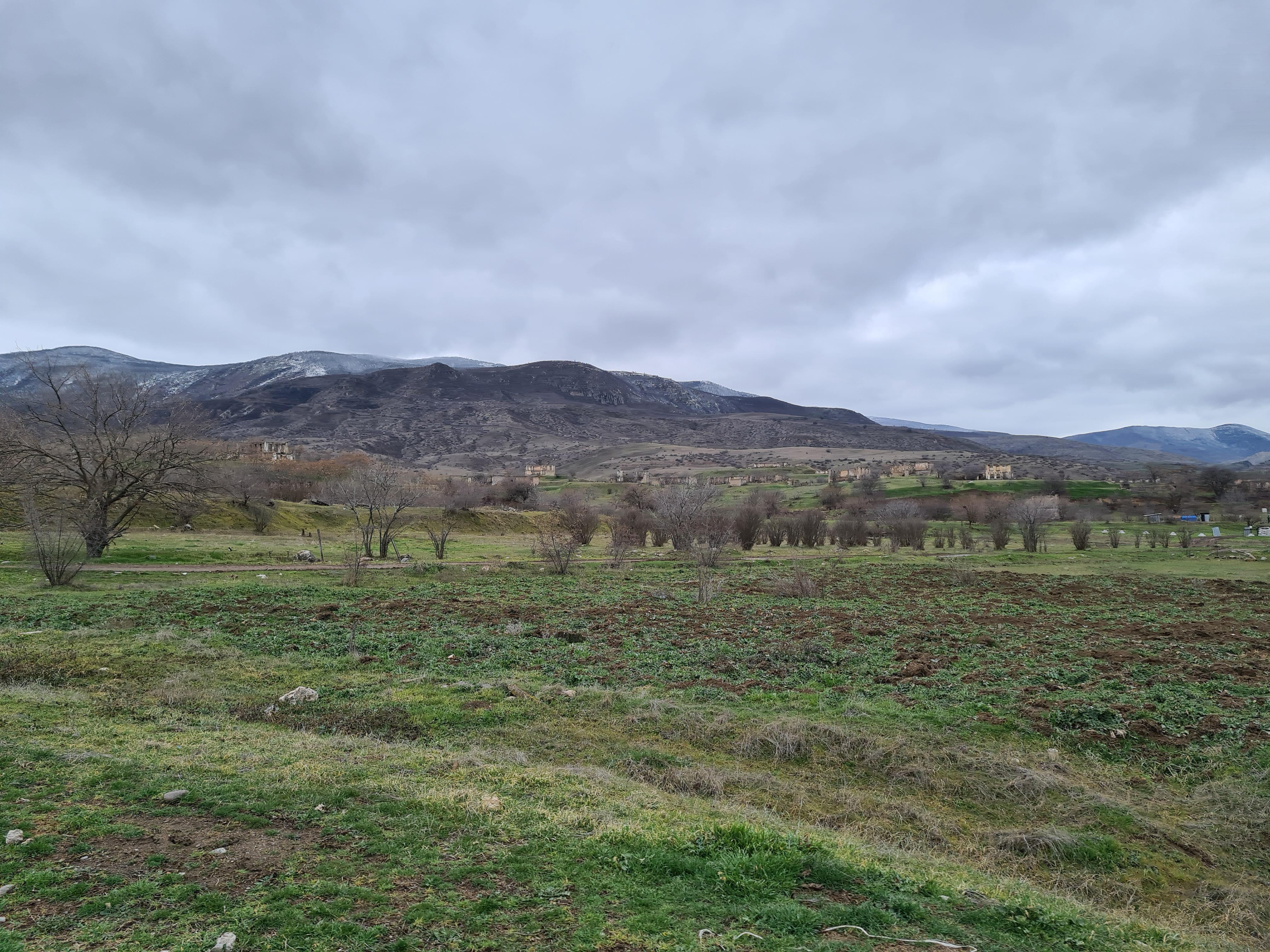

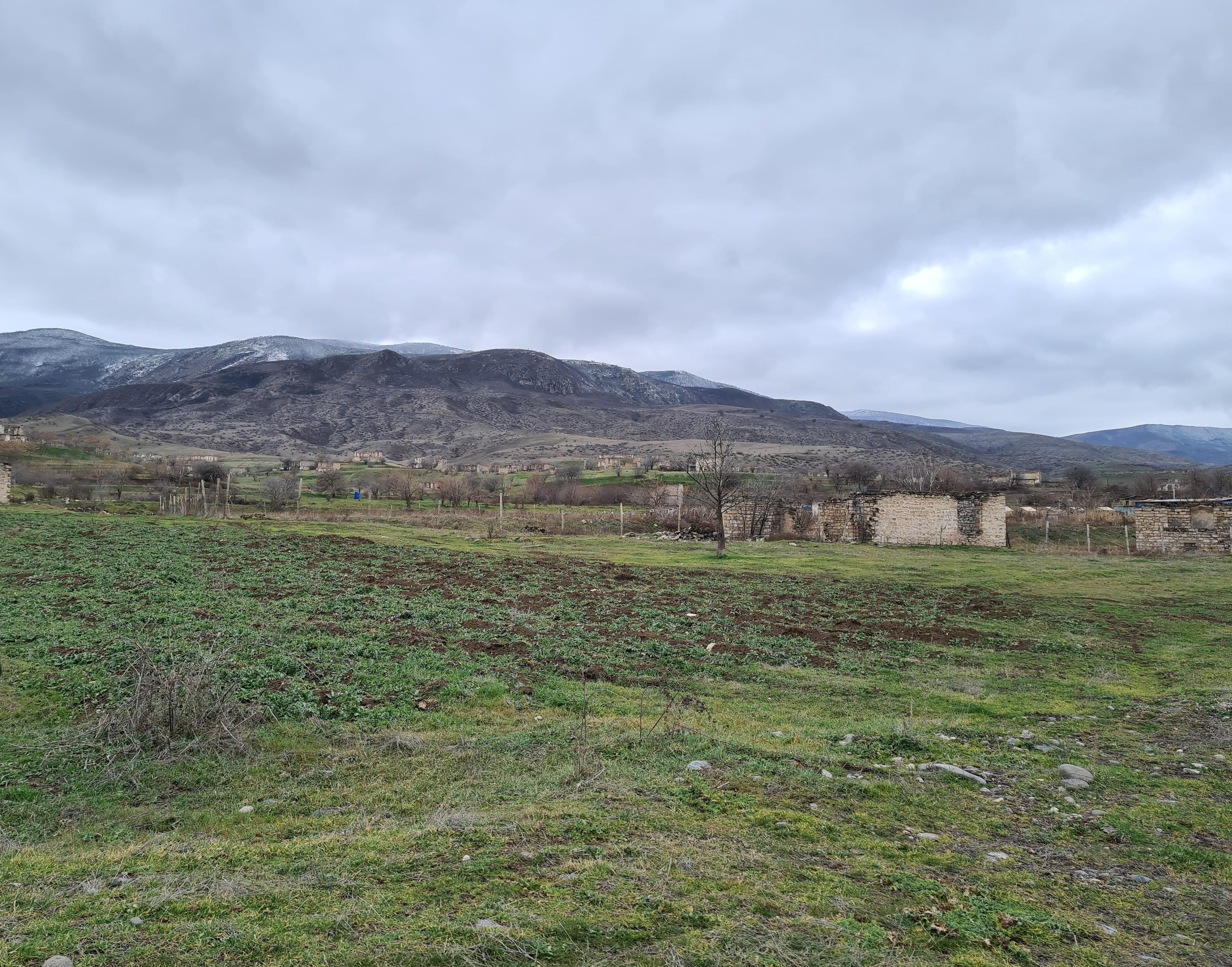
