= Hacılar, Tovuz =

Hacılar
- Location within Azerbaijan
- Coordinates: 40°44′N 45°35′E
- Country: Azerbaijan
- District: Tovuz
- Municipality: Çatax
- Time zone: UTC+4 (AZT)
  - Summer (DST): UTC+5 (AZT)

Hacılar (also, Hajilar) is a village in the Tovuz District of Azerbaijan.
