= Hacılar Höyük =

Archaeological site in Burdur, Turkey

Hacilar
- Location within Turkey Location within Near East
- 37°35′05.4″N 30°05′04.1″E
- Type: Settlement
- Periods: Pre-Pottery Neolithic
- Location: Turkey

History
- Built: 7040 BC

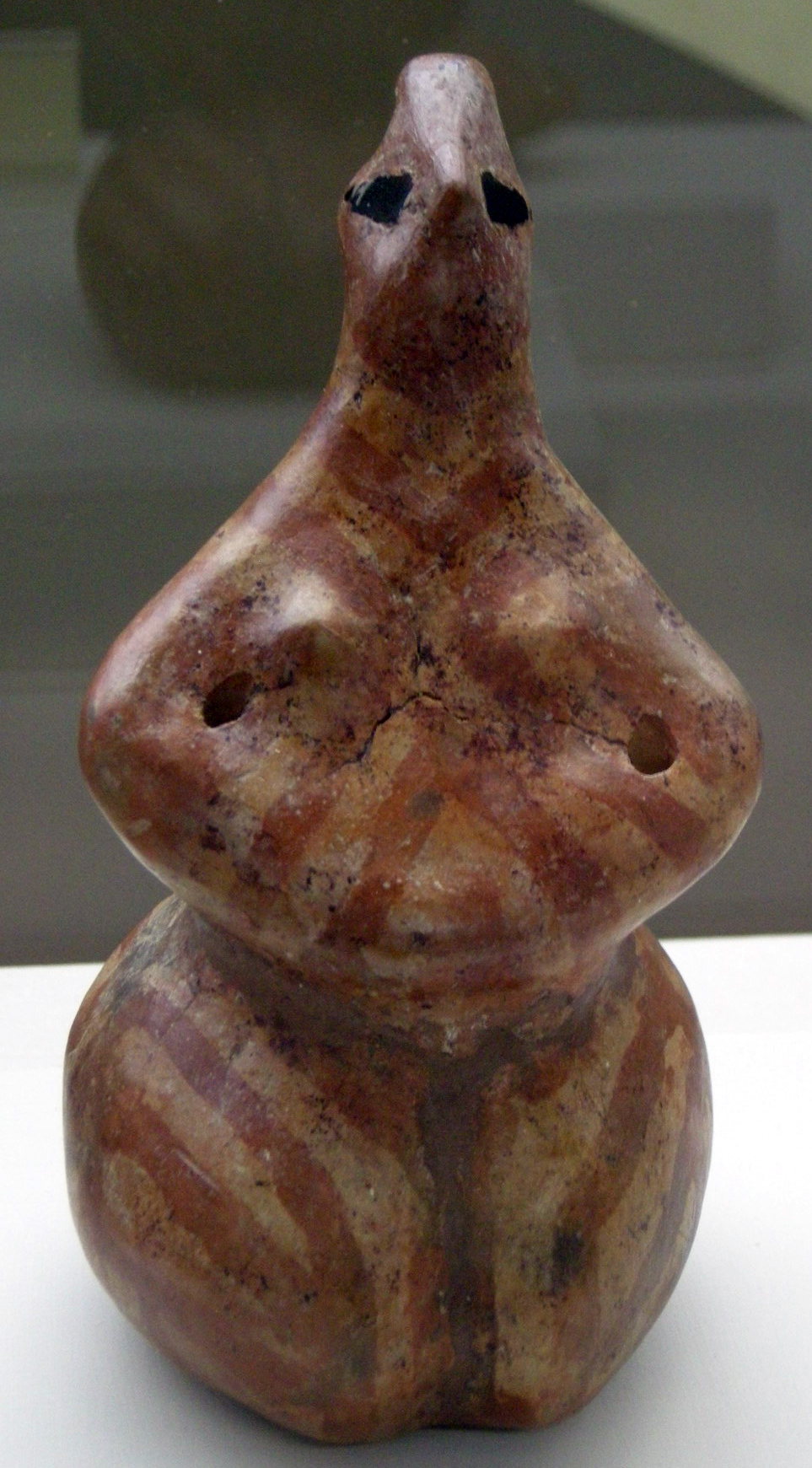
Statuette from Hacilar (5250-5000 BC), National Archaeological Museum (Florence)

Hacilar, or Hacılar Höyük ("Hacilar Mound"), is an early human settlement in southwestern Turkey, 23 km south of present-day Burdur. It has been dated back 7040 BC at its earliest stage of development. Archaeological remains indicate that the site was abandoned and reoccupied on more than one occasion in its history.

== Archaeological History ==
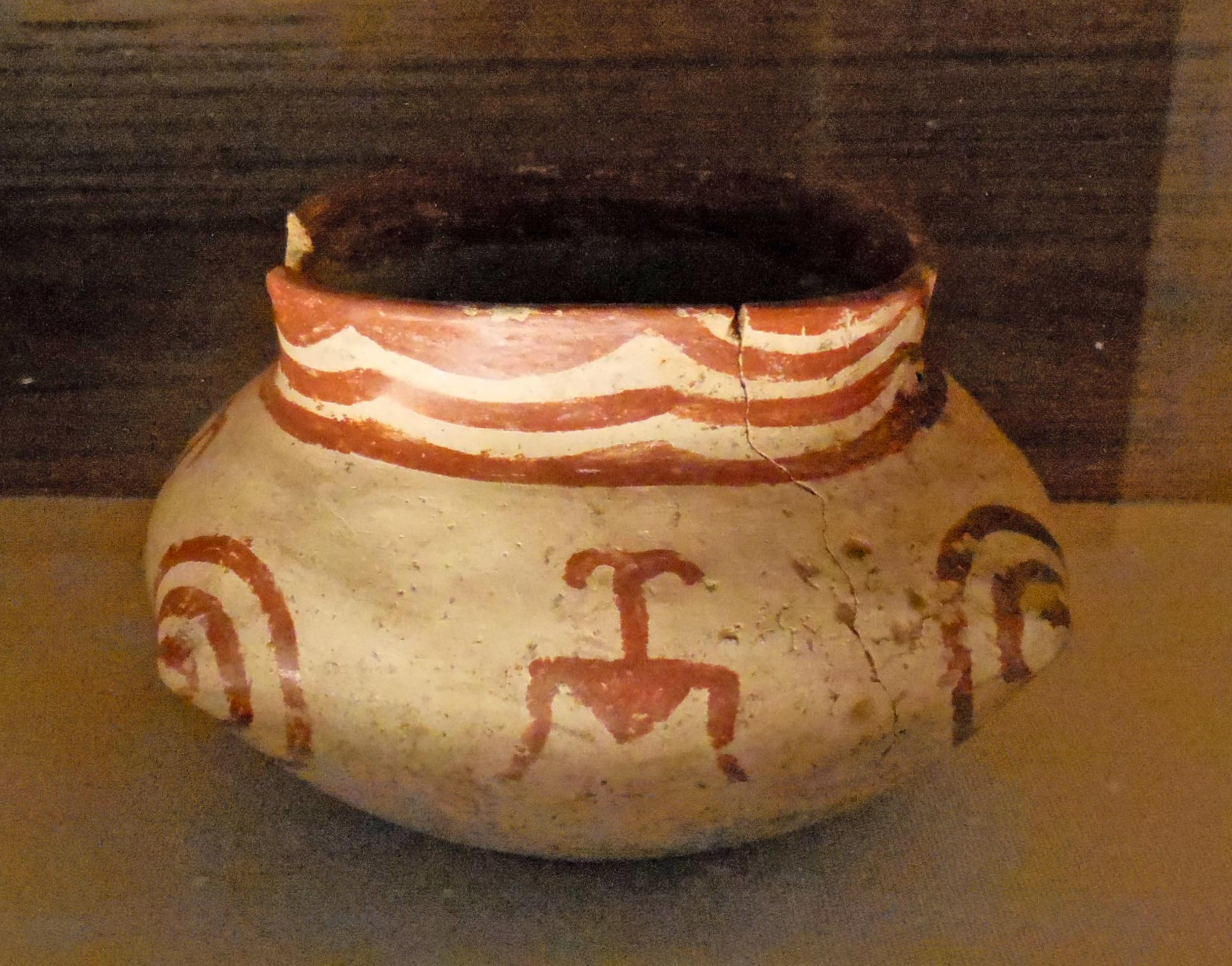
Terracotta vase painted in red from Haçilar. Late Neolithic – early Chalcolithic (late 6th – beginning of the 5th millennium BC). Rome, National Museum of Oriental Art (Palazzo Brancaccio)

Hacilar lived and died in prehistory. What remained of Hacilar became a mound on the plain and remained so until 1956. It was in this year that a local teacher showed the mound to British archaeologist James Mellaart. In 1957 the excavation of Hacilar began under Mellaart's direction and continued until 1960. The artifacts recovered during this excavation are currently on display at the Museum of Anatolian Civilizations in Ankara.

Ceramics from Hacilar show similarities with those of the Halaf culture from about the same period. There are also similarities in their figurines.

=== Stratigraphy ===
Up to 11 stratigraphic levels have been identified. The oldest strata belong to aceramic Neolithic, and are dated to the 8th millennium BC.

To the 6th millennium BC, nine levels are assigned, the oldest with ceramics, that were almost entirely undecorated.

Level VI is dating back to 5600 BC, and there were many activities at this time. Nine buildings were found, grouped around a square. Livelihood mainly consisted of agriculture. Spelt, wheat, barley, peas and vetch were cultivated. Villagers engaged in the breeding of animals; bones of cattle, pigs, sheep, goats and dogs were found. The pottery is simple, although some specimens represent animals.

Numerous nude female figures, made of clay, are quite remarkable, and possibly represent some divinity.

At level II (c. 5300 BC), the village was fortified and had a small temple.

The settlement of level I, dating after 5000 BC, differs significantly from the previous layers, so it is believed that there were newcomers who settled here. The site is now heavily fortified. The pottery is of high quality and is generally painted in red on a cream background.

== Architecture ==
Housing in Hacilar consisted of grouped units surrounding an inner courtyard. Each dwelling was built on a foundation of stone to protect against water damage. Walls were made of wood and daub or mud-brick that was mortared with lime. Wooden poles were located within each unit to support a flat roof. It is generally believed that these houses had an upper story made of wood.

The interiors were finished smooth with plaster and were rarely painted. Over time changes were made to the housing units; Querns, braziers and mortars appeared in the floors. Recesses in walls were also put to good use as cupboards. The kitchen was separated from the living rooms and the upper levels were used for granaries and/or workshops.

As Mellaart describes: 'The walls and floors were carefully plastered, laid on a pebble base. The plaster was frequently stained red and burnished or decorated with elementary geometric designs in red on cream.' In Hacilar houses no doorways were found. It seems possible that the entry was from the roof only.

== See also ==
- Çatalhöyük
- Köşk Höyük
- Mother Goddess

== Literature ==
- Mellaart, James. «Hacilar: A Neolithic Village Site» — Scientific American, August 1961, p. 86.
- Mellaart, James. «Earliest Civilizations of the Near East» - Thames & Hudson, London 1965, p. 80.
- Mellaart, James, "Excavations at Hacilar. v. 2: plates and figures", British Institute of Archaeology at Ankara. Occasional publications, nos. 9 & 10, Edinburgh University Press, 1970
- Mellaart, James, "Excavations at Hacılar. v. 1", British Institute of Archaeology at Ankara, Edinburgh University Press
