= Hacılar, Barda =

Hacılar
- Municipality
- Location within Azerbaijan Location within Karabakh Economic Region
- Coordinates: 40°20′33″N 47°16′49″E
- Country: Azerbaijan
- Rayon: Barda

Population
  - Total: 555
- Time zone: UTC+4 (AZT)
  - Summer (DST): UTC+5 (AZT)

Hacılar (also, Gadzhilar and Gadzhylar) is a village and municipality in the Barda Rayon of Azerbaijan. It has a population of 555.
