= Hacılar, Gadabay =

Hacılar
- Municipality
- Location within Azerbaijan
- Coordinates: 40°42′49″N 45°26′26″E
- Country: Azerbaijan
- Rayon: Gadabay

Population
  - Total: 2,156
- Time zone: UTC+4 (AZT)
  - Summer (DST): UTC+5 (AZT)

Hacılar (also, Gadzhylar and Gadzhilar) is a village and municipality in the Gadabay Rayon of Azerbaijan. It has a population of 2,156. The municipality consists of the villages of Hacılar, Qaravəlilər, Əyridərə, Sonalar, and Məmmədcəfərli.
