= Hacılar, Khachmaz =

Village in Khachmaz District, Azerbaijan

Hacılar
- Location within Azerbaijan
- Coordinates: 41°26′39″N 48°54′26″E
- Country: Azerbaijan
- Rayon: Khachmaz
- Municipality: Qalağan
- Time zone: UTC+4 (AZT)
  - Summer (DST): UTC+5 (AZT)

Hacılar (also, Gadzhylar) is a village in the Khachmaz Rayon of Azerbaijan. The village forms part of the municipality of Qalağan.
