= Tovuz District =

District in northwestern Azerbaijan

Coordinates: 40.9922°N 45.6289°E

- District
- Map of Azerbaijan showing Tovuz District
- Country: Azerbaijan
- Region: Gazakh-Tovuz
- Established: 8 August 1930
- Capital: Tovuz
- Settlements: 104

Government
  - Governor: Mammad Mammadov

Area
  - Total: 1,940 km^{2} (750 sq mi)

Population (2020)
  - Total: 177,200
  - Density: 91.3/km^{2} (237/sq mi)
- Time zone: UTC+4 (AZT)
- Postal code: 6000
- Website: tovuz-ih.gov.az

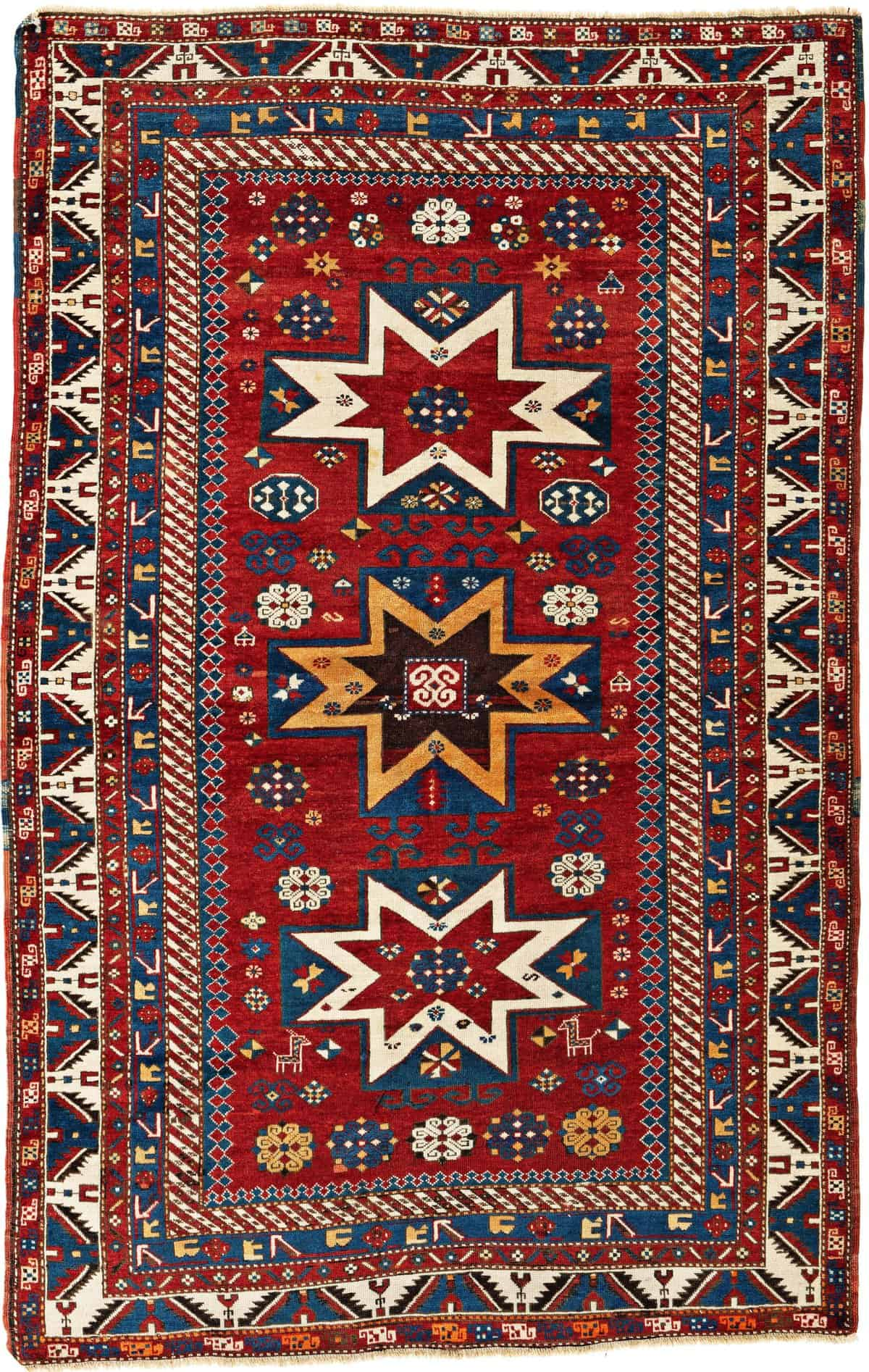
Tovuz Kazak 217 x 134 cm, Caucasus, late 19th century.

Tovuz District (Azerbaijani: Tovuz rayonu) is one of the 66 districts of Azerbaijan. It is located in the north-west of the country and belongs to the Gazakh-Tovuz Economic Region. The district borders the districts of Gadabay, Shamkir, Samukh, Agstafa, as well as the Tavush Province of Armenia and Kakheti region of Georgia. Its capital and largest city is Tovuz. As of 2020, the district had a population of 177,200. A major train line runs through the center, stopping at Tovuz Station.

In July 2020, Tovuz became the main site for the clashes with Armenia.

== Geography ==
Tovuz covers 412 km^{2}. The rayon is mountainous in the south, where it is crossed by the Lesser Caucasus mountains.

The region includes rich deposits of ores and precious metals, notably gold.

The region is located in the north-west of the Republic, bordering Georgia to the north, Armenia to the west, Gadabay to the south and south-west, Shamkir to the east, Samukh from north-east to the north.

The southern part of the district is located in the lowlands, the northern part lies in low mountainous and foothill zone, where positive and negative relief forms are shifted. There are three climate areas in the district:

- Dry subtropical climate. Characterized by soft summers and hot springs.
- Mild hot dry climate. This is a climate up to place less than 1000 meters high. The winter is mild and the spring is warmer.
- Mild cold, forest climate. This climatic hill covers the area from 1,000 to 2,000 meters. The spring is cool, and the winter is a bit frosty.

The river network:

- the Kur River in the north
- the Tovuz River in the central part
- the Akhunca River,
- the Asrik River,
- the Zayam River in the eastern part and its small arms,

The Kur River divides the region into two parts. The left coast is used as the main pasture for cattle breeding. The right bank of the river is used for agriculture, occupies the forest fund of the region and the meadow grassland. The annual rainfall is 40–70 mm.

== Villages ==
There about 20 main villages in the district. They are Quşçu, Öysüzlü, Ayıblı, Alakol, Yuxarı Öysüzlü, Abulbəyli, Düz Qırıqlı, Düz Cırdaxan, Yanıqlı, Qəribli, Azaplı, Bozalqanlı, Dönük Qırıqlı, İbrahimhacılı, Dondar Quşçu, Kirən, Əlibəyli villages and Qovlar settlement. Qovlar settlement is more populated area among them.

== Population ==
According to the statistics urbanization is low in the district. The population of the city is 26,968 and that of the village is 130,907. According to census of 2019, Tovuz has over 175.5 thousand people, out of which 1531 are war veterans.

Over 25536 are students and currently are in process of education.

According to census of 2012 quantity of people from different nations were divided in this way:

Tovuz District	157875
Azerbaijanis	157599
Turkish	157
Russians	76
Talysh	6
Таtars	4
Armenians	4
Other nations	21

== Cultural centers ==
Museums include Heydar Aliyev Center, History and Local Lore Museum, Ozan Ashug Museum and State Symbols Museum.

== Archaeology ==
The ancient village of Goytepe (Göy Tepe) is one of the largest archaeological monuments in Tovuz District, and in Ganja – Gazakh region. It is located 2 km to the northeast from the village of Aşağı Quşçu, and well south of the current course of Kura river, but closer to Tovuz river which is flowing into Kura.

Starting in 2008, “Tovuz Archaeological expedition” conducted new archaeological investigations at Goytepe, and also at the Mentesh tepe ancient settlement nearby. This is a joint investigation of archaeologists from Azerbaijan, Japan and France.

In this same area of Azerbaijan are also located the ancient sites of Shomu Tepe, Soyuq Bulaq, and Boyuk Kesik. Shulaveris Gora is just across the border in Georgia.

== Mentesh tepe ==
Mentesh tepe is located close to Zeyem river about 10 km east of Goytepe. The excavations of Neolithic levels at Mentesh Tepe have brought to light a material culture related to the Shulaveri-Shomu culture, with some similarity to Baba-Dervish site. The earliest levels of Mentesh represent an advanced Neolithic culture with full domestication of cereals and animals. The pottery is also found, although in small numbers.

The occupation at Mentesh continued for a long period to the end of the Early Bronze Age. Local metallurgy here started already in the first half of the 6th millennium, and developed further during the second half of the 5th millennium.

== Economy ==
The region is dominated by agriculture. Wine, fruit, vegetables and grain crops are all produced along with cattle.

Stock raising is one of the main revenue source of this region:

Year	2006	2007	2008	2009	2010	2011
The number of cattle	38280	39993	40813	41558	41741	42275
Number of cows and buffalos	16185	16987	17330	17416	17420	17587
Number of sheep and goat	183429	192050	193543	195542	195749	196362
Birds		340033	347605	375607	385025	409252
Pigs	200	210	215	-	-	-
horses		659	664	724	804	774
Donkeys		3049	3051	3052	2986	2795
Meat(tons)	23424	24852	25532	25839	27350	28225
Eggs	14628	14970	15140	15310	15840	16015
Wool production(tons)	295	331	340	344	351	358

There are 24 entities which operate in industrial and agricultural sphere:

Year	2006	2007	2008	2009	2010
Bread	1844	1626	1840	2156	2686
Building sand(,000 tons)	5	6.7	7.8	13.4	5.9
Flour(tons)	1536	1504	1306	888	483
Wheat bran(tons)	497.6	349.4	190.7	148.7	131.6
Wheat groats(tons)	72.5	32.9	31.0	15.0	100
Wine(,000 dal)	17.1	26.2	17.0	13.7	25.3
Fruit alcohol(,000 dal)	63.0	36.3	-	-	-
Cognac, thousand dal	6.7	36.4	11.1	10.3	9.1
Refined sugar, tons	140.0	155.7	70.0	28.0	--
Asphalt, bituminous mixtures.	0.4	--	1.4	--	--

Where the sown areas for agricultural plants are:

Year	2005	2007	2008	2009	2010	2011
Tovuz District	27 182	26 868	26 927	26 827	22 659	21 839

== 2020 Tovuz clashes ==
According to Azerbaijani MOD, in the afternoon of July 12, Armenian Armed Forces started to fire on Azerbaijani State Border Service positions in Tovuz region using artillery mounds. Thus, clashes between the Armenian Armed Forces and Azerbaijani Armed Forces broke out on July 12.The skirmishes resumed on 13 July and are ongoing with varying intensity, having resulted in at least 16 military and one civilian casualties. Among Azerbaijani military casualties were one major general (Polad Hashimov), one colonel (Ilgar Mirzayev) and two majors (Anar Novruzov and Namig Ahmadov). However, the fighting has decreased, the situation in the region is still considered as volatile.

== Notable natives ==
- Ganira Pashayeva, Member (MP) of the National Assembly of Azerbaijan for Tovuz District and journalist

== Gallery ==
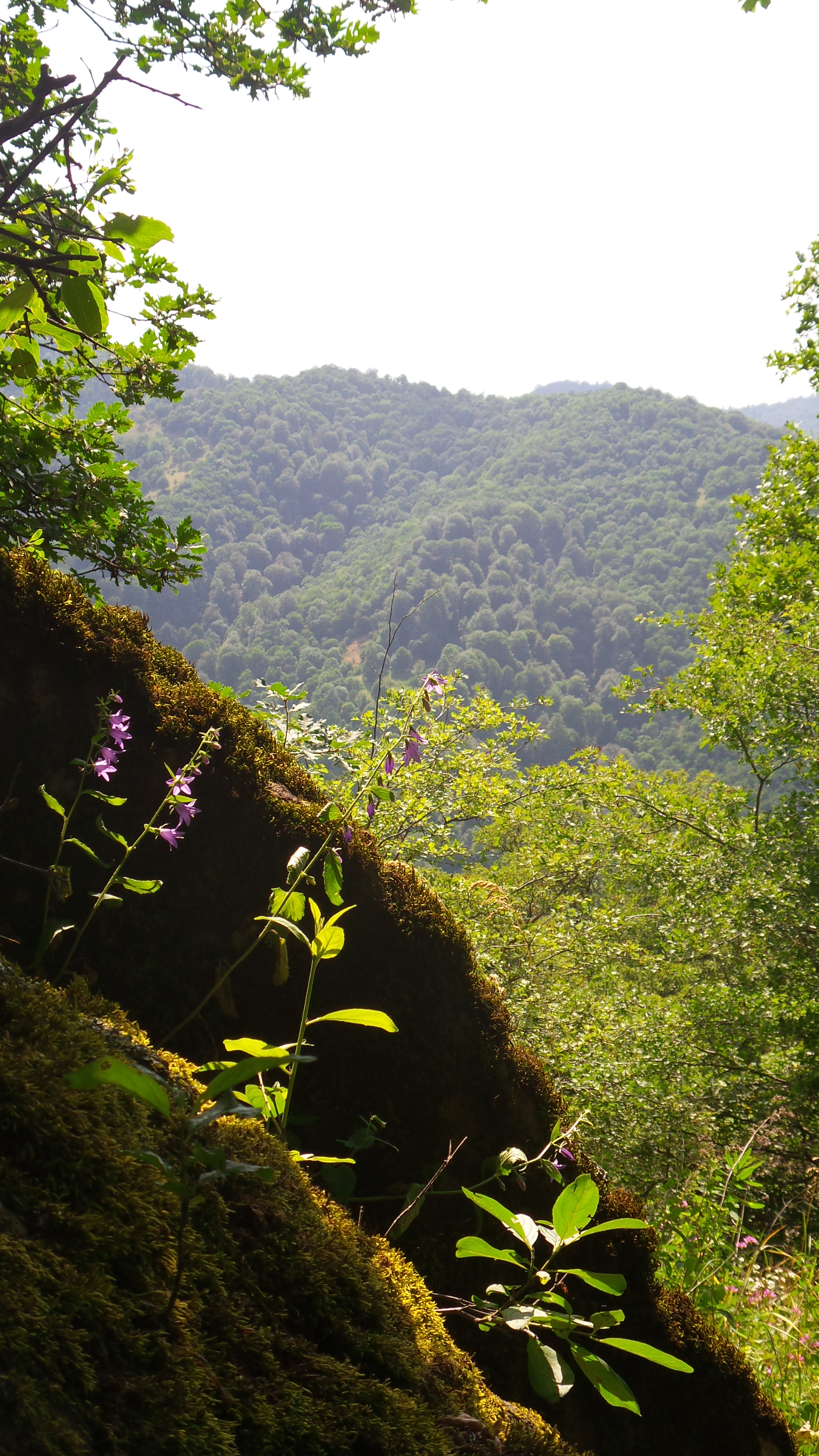
Nature in Tovuz District

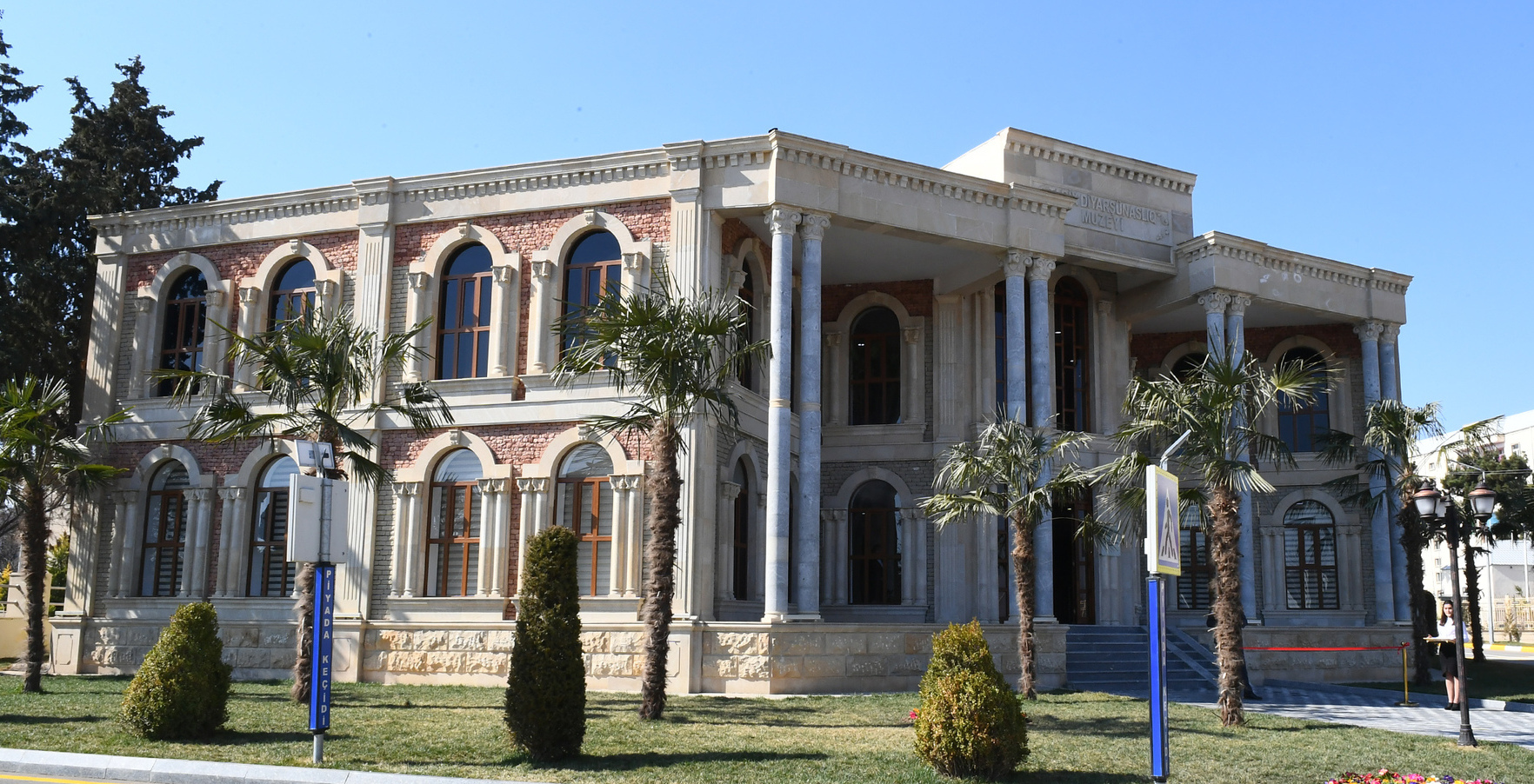
Museum of History in Tovuz

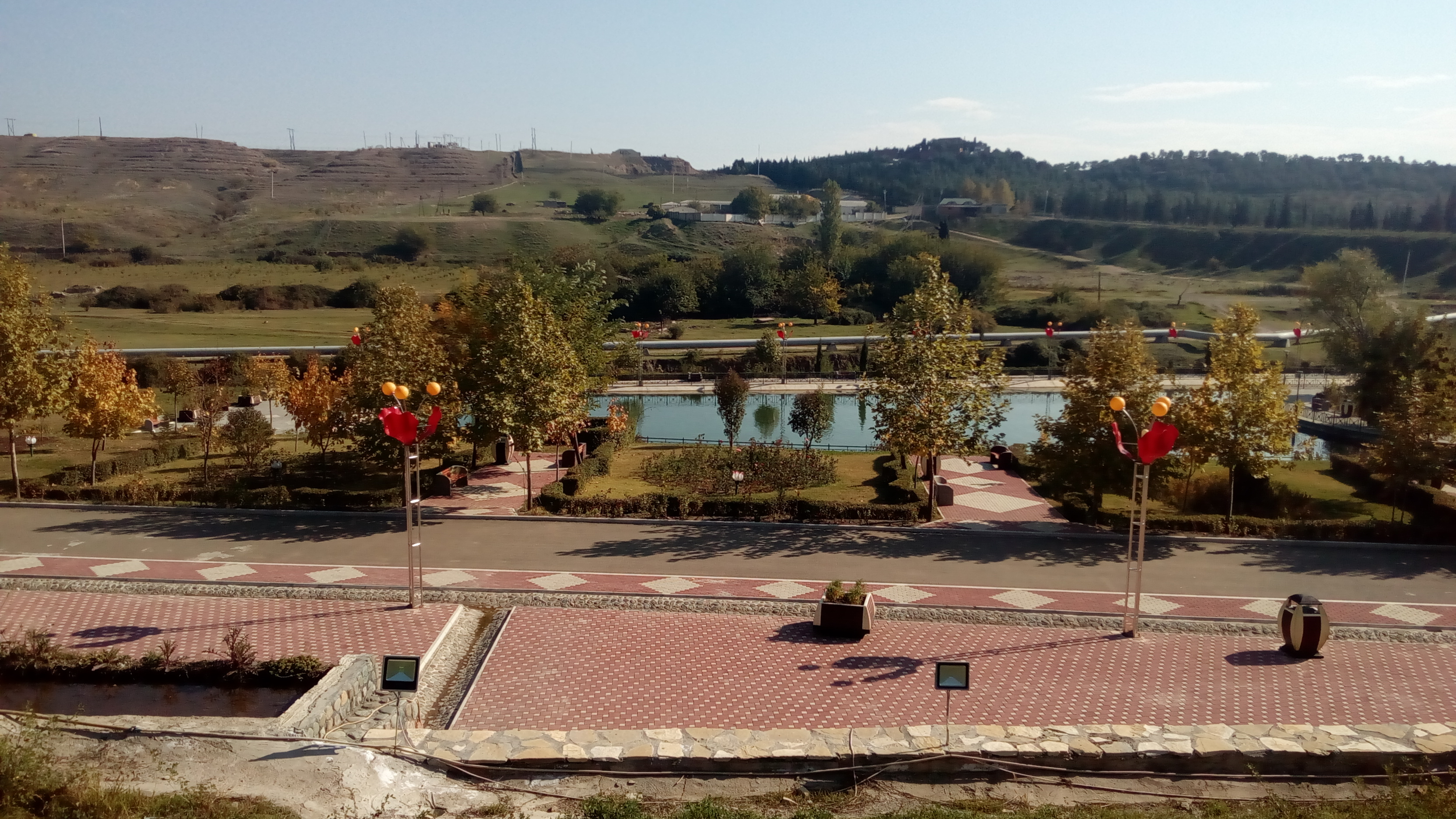
Park in Tovuz
