= Danah =

Danah is a feminine given name, and may refer to:

- Danah Al-Nasrallah (born 1988), Kuwaiti sprinter
- danah boyd (born 1977), American social media scholar
- Danah Hussain (born 1986), Iraqi sprinter
- Danah Zohar (born 1945), American philosopher

== See also ==
- Dana (disambiguation)
- Dannah
- Daynah
