= Dana =

Dana may refer to:

== Businesses and organisations ==
- Dana (company), a Slovenian beverage company
- DANA (payment service), in Indonesia
- Dana Air, a Nigerian airline
- Dana College, formerly in Nebraska, U.S.
- Dana Energy, an Iranian oil and gas company
- Dana Gas, a natural gas company Sharjah, United Arab Emirates
- Dana Incorporated, an American auto parts firm
- Dana Foundation, an American private philanthropic foundation
- Dana Mall, in Manama, Bahrain
- Dana Petroleum, a Scottish oil and gas exploration and production company
- Dana Research Centre and Library, in London, England
- House of Dana, a perfumery founded in 1932

== People ==
- Dana (given name), including a list of people and fictional characters with the given name
- Dana (surname), including a list of people with the surname

== Places ==
=== Ancient world ===
- Tyana in Cappadocia, referred to by Xenophon as Dana
- Tynna in Cappadocia, possibly Dana

=== United States ===
- Dana, California
- Dana, Illinois
- Dana, Indiana
- Dana, Iowa
- Dana, Kentucky
- Dana, Massachusetts
- Dana, North Carolina
- Mount Dana (disambiguation), the name of several mountains
- Dana Butte, in the Grand Canyon, Arizona

=== Other places ===
- Dana, Saskatchewan, Canada
  - CFS Dana, a former military radar installation
- Dana Lake, in Quebec, Canada
- Dana, Ethiopia
- Dana County, Iran
  - Dana Rural District
- Dana, Jordan
  - Dana Biosphere Reserve
- Dana, Nepal, a village development committee
- Dana, Khyber Pakhtunkhwa
- Dana, Pomeranian Voivodeship
- Al-Dana, Syria
- Al-Dana, Maarrat al-Nu'man

== Other uses ==
- Dàna, an online Scottish Gaelic periodical
- Dāna, the practice of generosity or giving in Dharmic religions
- Dana (car), a Danish car built by Hakon Olsen 1908–1914
- Dana (ship), the name of several ships
- Dana 24, an American sailboat
- Dana classification system, for minerals
- Dana language, or Buldit, in Ethiopia
- DANA (depresión aislada en niveles altos), a cut-off low meteorologicial event
- "Dana.", zoological taxonomic authority abbreviation standing fo rJames Dwight Dana (1813–1895)
- 152 mm SpGH DANA, a Czech artillery gun
- Cyclone Dana, in West Bengal and Odisha in India, 2024
- "The Dana", local name of Shrewsbury Prison, England, near medieval Dana Gaol
- ZAZ Dana, a Ukrainian automobile model

== See also ==
- Daan (disambiguation)
- D'Anna, a name
- Danna (disambiguation)
- Dannah, name
- Taningia danae, the Dana octopus squid
