= Niğde Stele =

8th century BC monument discovered in Turkey

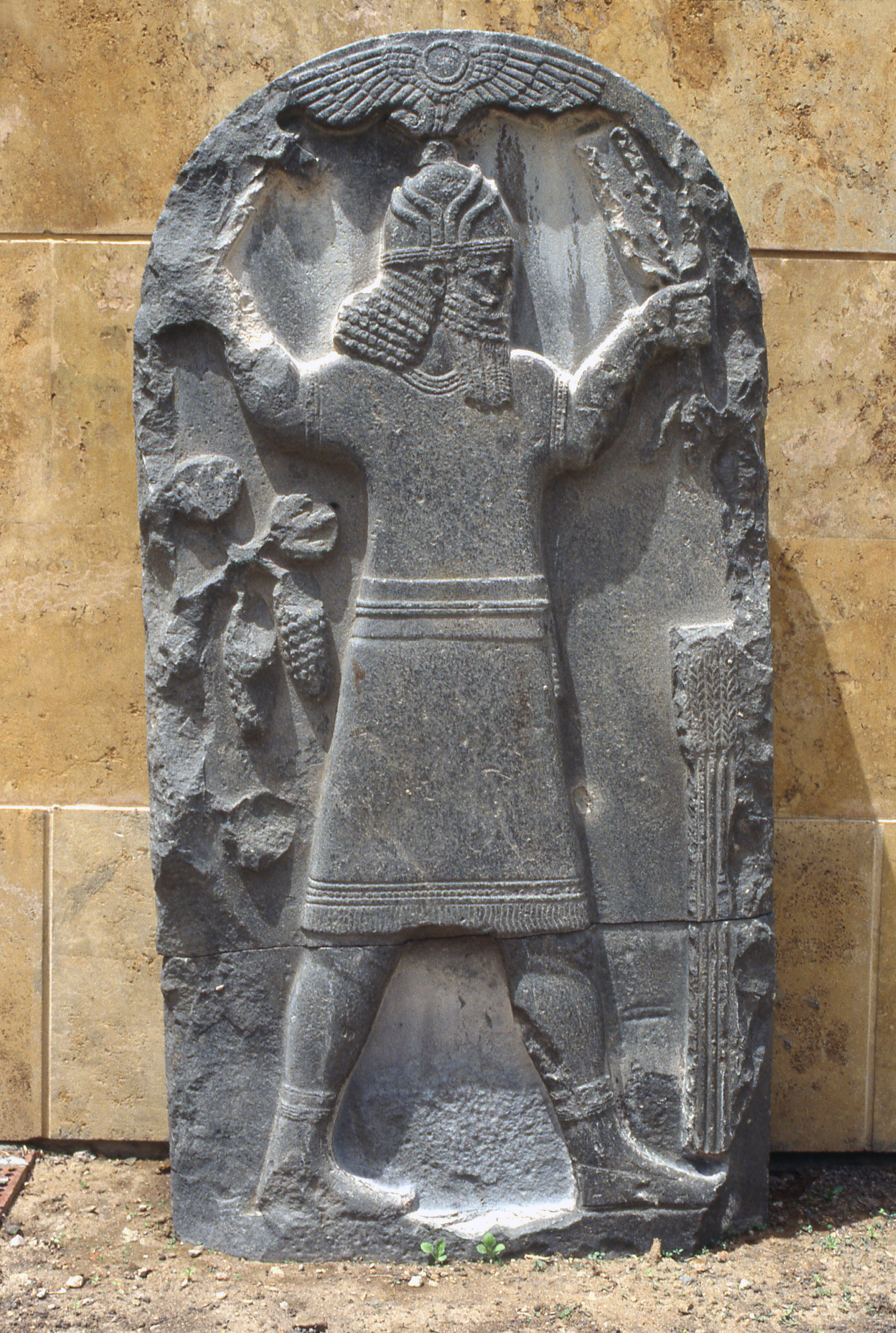
- Material: Basalt
- Height: 2.18 meters
- Width: c. 1 meter
- Created: c. 705 BC
- Discovered: 24 September 1975; Nigde, Nigde, Turkey
- Present location: Nigde, Nigde, Turkey

The Niğde Stele is a Neo-Hittite monument from the modern Turkish city of Niğde, which dates from the end of the 8th century BC.

== Discovery ==
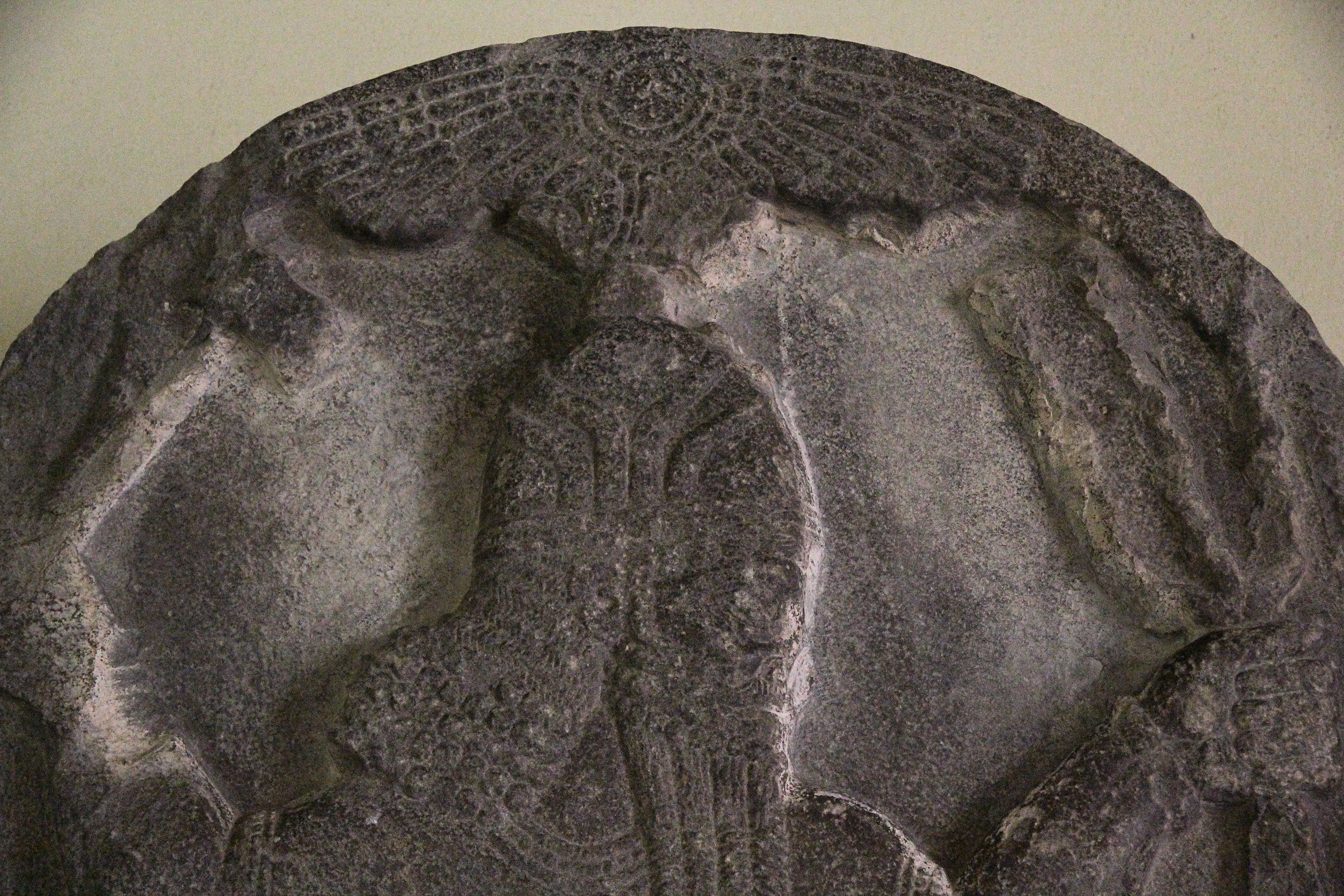
Detail

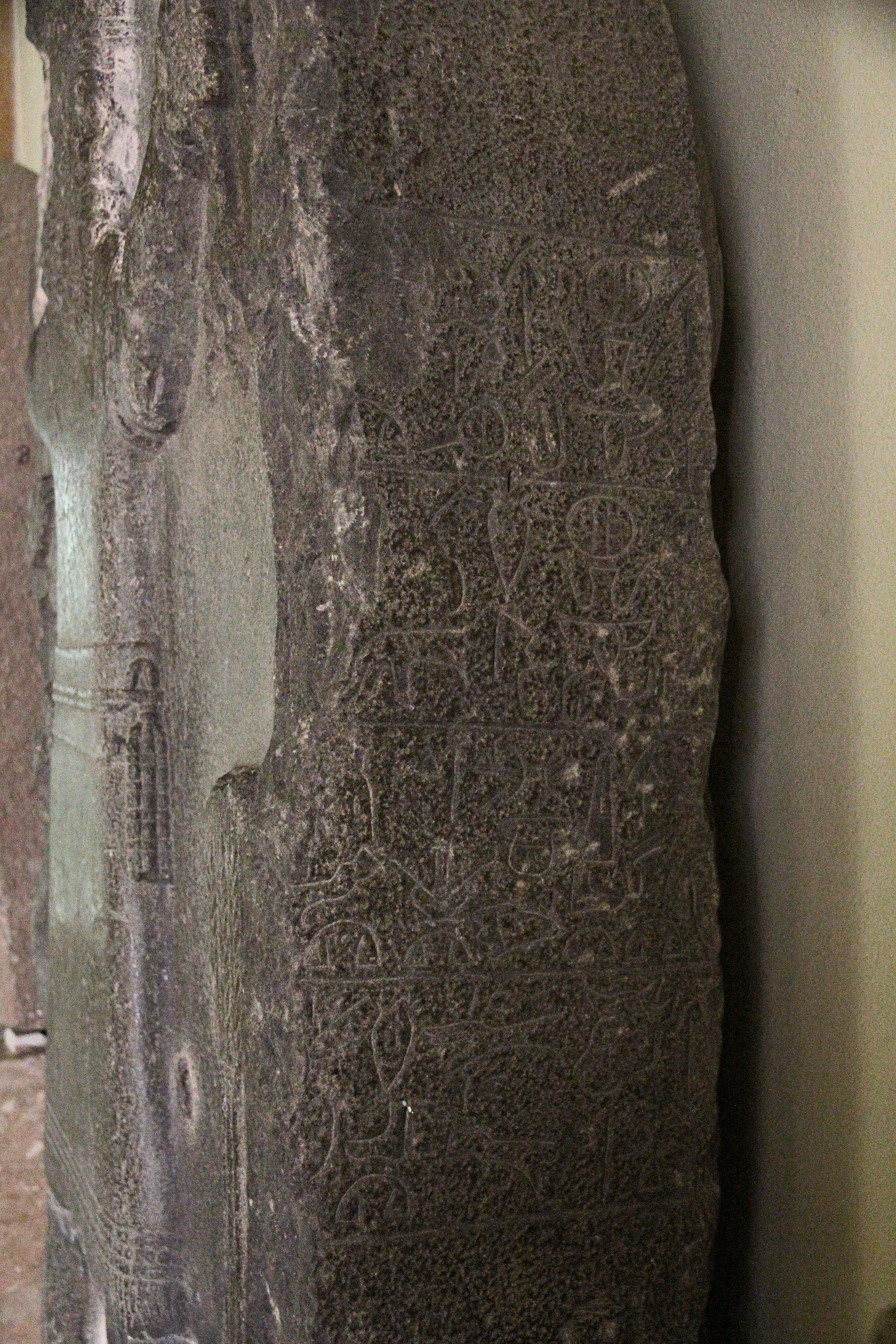
Hieroglyphic inscription

The stele was found on 24 September 1975 near the citadel of Niğde in the Çelebi Hüsamettin Bey Mosque (now Dışarı Camii), where it was reused, carved side down, as a step in front of the entrance to the mosque. It is now in the Niğde Archaeological Museum (inventory no. 22.1.75).

== Description ==
The black basalt stele is 2.18 metres (7 ft 2 in) high and about a metre wide and belongs to a type which developed in the 10th century BC. It depicts the weather god Tarhunzas, holding an axe and a thunderbolt in his raised hands. Vines sprout from the ground to his left and grain to the right, similar to the İvriz relief. A very similar depiction of the same god appears on the relief in the village of Gökbez, some 22 km to the south. The figure is depicted with clothing, hair and beard of the Assyrian style. The winged solar disk, a traditional symbol of the ruler, hovers over his head.

On the right edge of the stone block is an inscription in Luwian hieroglyphs, recording the dedication of the stele to Tarhunzas by king Muwaharanis, the son of king Warpalawas:

This Tarhunzas Muwaharanis [ma]de (?), the Hero, the King, loved by Tarhunzas (and) the gods, the son of Warpalawas, the Ruler, the Hero.

Muwaharanis succeeded his father Warpalawas on the throne of the late Luwian kingdom of Tuwana, a successor state of the Hittite Tuwanuwa, in the southern part of the modern Niğde Province. Since it is known that Warpalawas was still reigning in 709 BC, the stele must date some time after that year, making it the latest known and datable example of such a relief, and perhaps the latest known Luwian inscription, with the possible exception of the bilingual Azatiwada inscription at Karatepe.

== Bibliography ==
- John Boardman (Ed.): The Cambridge Ancient history. Plates to volume III : the Middle East, the Greek world and the Balkans to the sixth century B.C. Cambridge University Press, Cambridge 1984 pp. 85–87 ISBN 9780521242899
