= Keşlik Stele =

Neo-Hittite monument

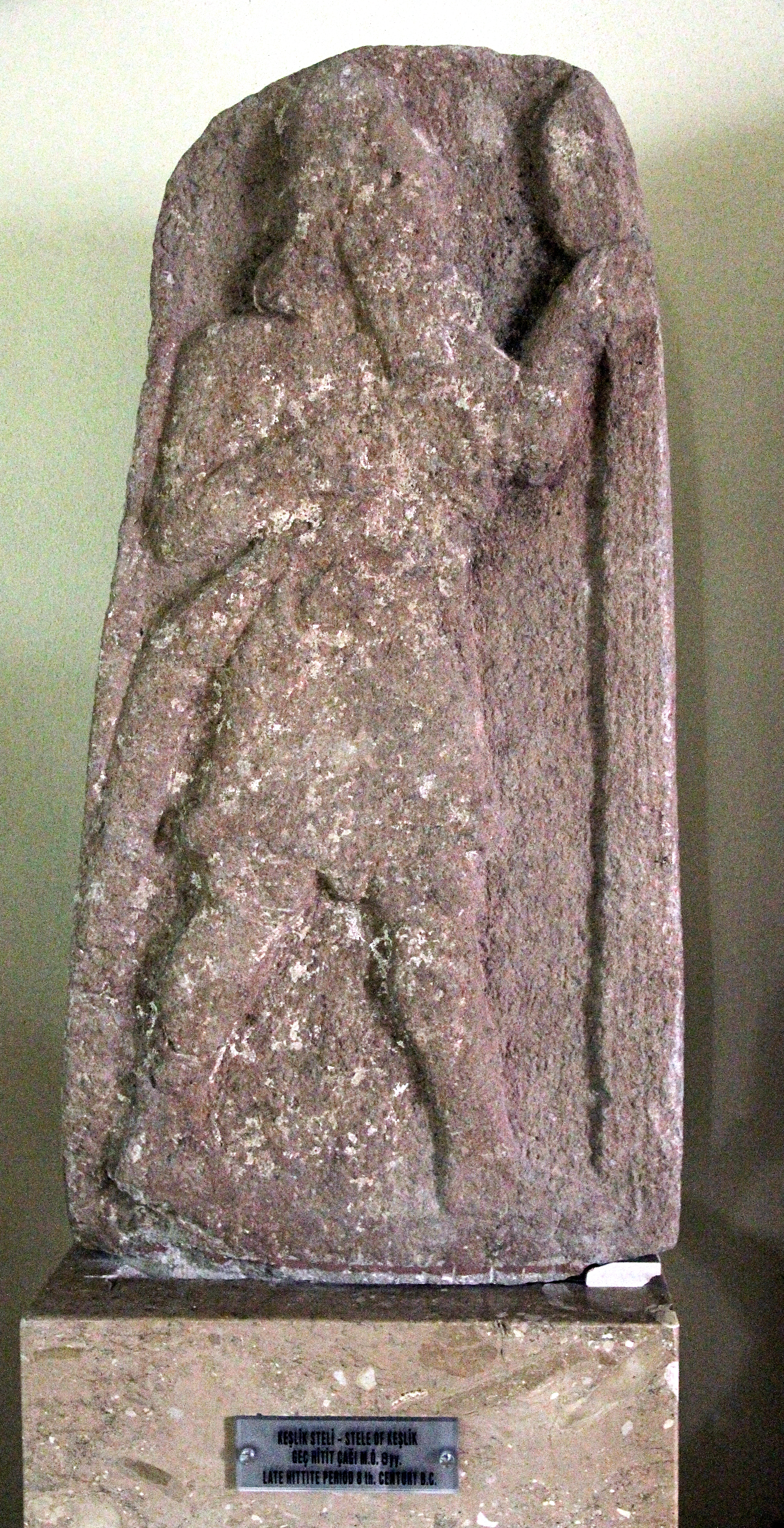
- Height: 1.45 meters
- Width: 69 cm
- Created: c. 723 BC
- Discovered: 1962; Nigde, Turkey
- Discovered by: Aykut Cınaroglu
- Present location: Nigde, Nigde Province, Turkey

The Keşlik Stele is a Neo-Hittite monument from northern Tyana, near Niğde discovered in 1962 in southern Turkey, which dates from the 8th century BC.

== Discovery ==
The stele was discovered by Vural Sezer in the Bayındır Yaylası summer pasture of the village of Keşlik, a plateau north of Altunhisar in Niğde Province and was installed in the Niğde Museum. The location of discovery was part of the Iron Age Luwian kingdom of Tuwana. According to the testimony of local landowner Abdullah Tanik about the find, it was discovered by Turkish archaeologist Aykut Çınaroğlu in a 1962 survey. The stele had probably fallen from a hill which rises 25 m above the surrounding fields, since a depression has been found there which could have contained the pedestal of a stele. The monument is now in the Niğde Archaeological Museum and has the inventory number 51.

== Description ==
The brown Basalt stele is 1.45 m high, 69 cm wide and about 27 cm thick. The upper surface is severely weathered and pock marked. The image depicts the weather god Tarhunzas facing right. He is dressed in a short kilt, a short-sleeved over-tunic with a wide belt, and thigh-high boots. His head is bearded and he has shoulder-length hair, covered by a horned helmet. His right hand is bent at his side and holds a cluster of grapes, while his left hand holds a bundle of corn ears. Thegrape cluster and the corn ears both grow up from the ground on either side of him.

In the space to the right, between the figure and the corn ears, John David Hawkins detected nine lines of an inscription, which probably continued on the side of the stele. Because of the poor state of preservation of the stele, it was not legible.

The image is very similar to the depiction of the weather god on the İvriz relief. As a result, the Keşlik stele is dated to the same time as it - the reign of King Warpalawas II of Tuwana (740-705).

== Bibliography ==
- Vural Sezer. "Keşlik Steli." Anadolu 18, 1974 [1978], pp. 133–134
- Vural Sezer. "Bor-Keşlik Steli" Türk arkeoloji dergisi 24(2) 1977, pp. 147–148.
- Dietrich Berges, Johannes Nollé. Tyana - Archäologisch-historische Untersuchungen zum südwestlichen Kappadokien. Habelt, Bonn 2000, ISBN 3-7749-2959-9 p. 103.
- John David Hawkins: Corpus of Hieroglyphic Luwian Inscriptions. Vol. I: Inscriptions of the Iron Age. Part 2: Text. Amuq, Aleppo, Hama, Tabal, Assur Letters, Miscellaneous, Seals, Indices. (= Studies in Indo-European Language and Culture 8). de Gruyter, Berlin. 2000, ISBN 3-11-010864-X. p. 531 No. X.51 Tbl. 305.
