= Dana (ship) =

The following ships have carried the name Dana

- SS Dana (1883), a steamship
- Dana (1919), four-masted motor schooner, 1919–1924
- Dana (1921), deep-sea steam trawler, 1921–1935, former HMT John Quilliam
- Dana (1937), deep-sea trawler, 1937–1980, now rigged as 3-masted schooner, Gulden Leeuw
- Dana (1980), research vessel, 1980–present

== See also ==
- Dana (disambiguation)
