= Daan =

Daan or Da'an may refer to:

== People ==
- Daan (given name), Dutch short form for Daniël
- Saumya Daan (born 1982), Indian voice actor
- Serge Daan (1940–2018), Dutch zoologist

== Places ==
=== Mainland China ===
- Da'an, Hengyang (大安乡), a township in Hengyang County
- Da'an, Longshan (大安乡)
- Da'an, Jilin (大安市)
- Da'an, Zigong (大安区)

=== Taiwan ===
- Daan District, Taipei (大安區)
  - Daan metro station
- Da'an River (大安溪)
- Daan District, Taichung (大安區)

=== Elsewhere ===
- Daʽan, Sanaa Governorate, Yemen

== Chinese history ==
- Da'an (大安, 1075–1085), era name used by Emperor Huizong of Western Xia
- Da'an (大安, 1085–1094), era name used by Emperor Daozong of Liao
- Da'an (大安, 1209–1211), era name used by Wanyan Yongji, emperor of Jin dynasty

== Other uses ==
- Daan (band), a Belgian band led by Daan Stuyven
- Daan (crater), crater on Mars named after the Chinese city
- Da'an, a character in TV series Earth: Final Conflict

== See also ==
- Dayan (disambiguation)
- Dana (disambiguation)
- Daan Utsav, Indian festival
