= Gökbez relief =

Coordinates: 37°45′13.4″N 34°39′25.4″E

Location of the Gökbez relief within Turkey.

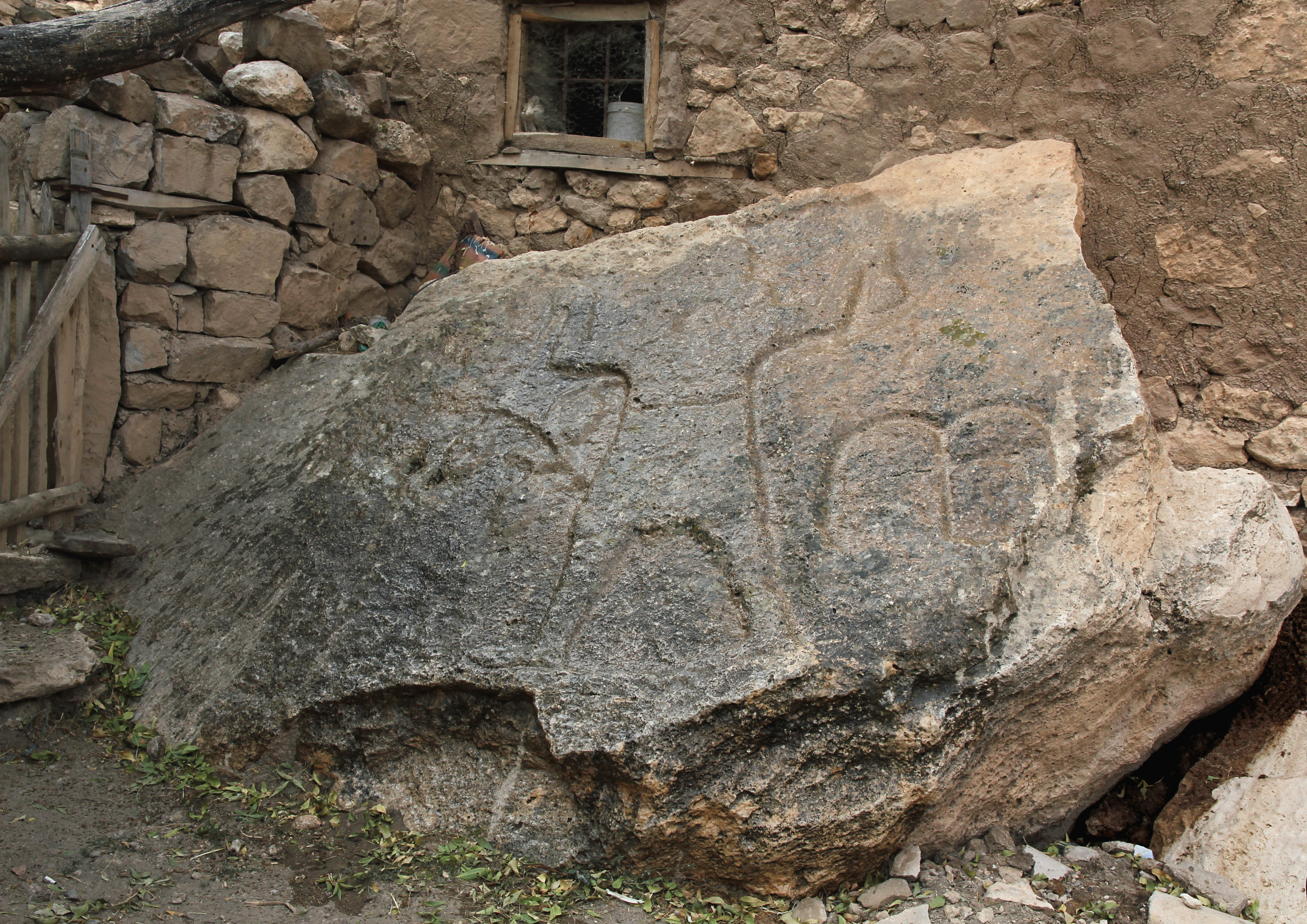
The Gökbez relief.

The Hittite Gökbez relief is a rock relief at Gökbez and dates from the time of the Neo-Hittite states. Rock reliefs are a prominent aspect of Hittite art.

== Location ==
The relief is in a courtyard in Gökbez, Bor District, Niğde Province, Turkey, about 12 km southeast of Kemerhisar and 22 km south of the provincial capital of Niğde. Kemerhisar is the site of the ancient city of Tyana and was centre of the minor Luwian state of Tuwanuwa. The ancient route from Tyana, through Halala to the Cilician Gates, was probably already in use in Hittite times. The relief lies beside the old path.

== Description ==
The relief lies broken away and on its side in a courtyard in the village, leaning on the exterior wall of a house. The stone block measures 3 metres wide and 2.4 metres high, the relief is 2 metres x 2 metres. The badly weathered image shows the god Tarhunzas facing left. He holds a double axe in his right hand and a thunderbolt in his left. The god has a beard and long hair which falls to his shoulders. He is dressed in a knee-length robe with a broad belt. A vine grows up between his legs and grape clusters hang down beside him to the left. To the right of the figure is a double arch with a horizontal line running across it two thirds of the way up.

Dietrich Berges and Johannes Nollé suggest that it probably originally contained (or was intended to contain) an inscription. Horst Eringhaus thought it was a Phrygian double idol, like that described by Dietrich Berndt at Midas Kenti. The posture and costume of the figure show strong similarities to the Niğde Stele (on display in the Niğde Archaeological Museum), which also depicts Tarhunzas. For this reason, the relief is dated to the late 8th or early 7th century BC.

== Bibliography ==
- Erol Faydalı. "Gökbez Kaya Kabartması." Anadolu 18, 1974, pp. 135–136 (PDF).
- Dietrich Berges, Johannes Nollé. Tyana - Archäologisch-historische Untersuchungen zum südwestlichen Kappadokien. Rudolf Habelt, Bonn 2000 ISBN 3-7749-2959-9 pp. 103–104.
- Horst Ehringhaus. Das Ende, das ein Anfang war - Felsreliefs und Felsinschriften der luwischen Staaten Kleinasiens vom 12. bis 8./7. Jahrhundert v. Chr. Nünnerich-Asmus, Mainz 2014, ISBN 978-3-943904-67-3 pp. 61–66.
