= Spiritual intelligence =

Philosophical term

Spiritual intelligence (SI) is a term used by some philosophers, psychologists, and developmental theorists to indicate spiritual parallels with intelligence quotient (IQ) and emotional intelligence (EI).

== Origins ==
Danah Zohar coined the term "spiritual intelligence" and introduced the idea in 1997 in her book ReWiring the Corporate Brain.

In the same year, 1997, Ken O'Donnell, an Australian author and consultant living in Brazil, also introduced the term "spiritual intelligence" in his book Endoquality - the emotional and spiritual dimensions of the human being in organizations.

In 2000, in the book Spiritual Intelligence, author Steven Benedict outlined the concept as a perspective offering a way to bring together the spiritual and the material, that is ultimately concerned with the well-being of the universe and all who live there.

Howard Gardner, the originator of the theory of multiple intelligences, chose not to include spiritual intelligence in his "intelligences" due to the challenge of codifying quantifiable scientific criteria. Instead, Gardner suggested an "existential intelligence" as viable. The contemporary researchers continue to explore the viability of Spiritual Intelligence (often abbreviated as "SQ" or "SI") and to create tools for measuring and developing it. So far, measurement of spiritual intelligence has tended to rely on self-assessment instruments, which can be susceptible to false or unreliable reporting.

However, in his 2009 doctoral dissertation, Yosi Amram found that the self-reported measure of spiritual intelligence predicted leadership effectiveness as rated by outside observers. In this research, he also deployed 360-assessments of spiritual intelligence and emotional intelligence, finding observer ratings of SI to predict the leadership effectiveness ratings from other observers, offering predictive validity for SI even when controlling for emotional intelligence. Studies by other researchers have shown that leaders’ SI can predict a variety of positive outcomes, such as financial performance of their organizations. Such cross-method studies lend overall validity to the construct of spiritual intelligence and its self- and 360-assessments.

A broad review of the research on SI has shown that 1. several valid measurement instruments exist, 2. they offer positive incremental predictive validity across a variety of desirable outcomes, and 3. there is a neurological and biological basis for Spiritual Intelligence, highlighting the plausibility of its evolutionary adaptability, all of which supports SI's validity as an intelligence.

== Applications ==
Variations of spiritual intelligence are sometimes used in corporate settings as a means of motivating employees and providing a non-religious, diversity-sensitive framework for addressing issues of values in the workplace. According to Stephen Covey, "Spiritual intelligence is the central and most fundamental of all the intelligences, because it becomes the source of guidance for the others."

== Definitions ==
Definitions of spiritual intelligence rely on the concept of spirituality as being distinct from religiosity - existential intelligence.

Danah Zohar defined 12 principles underlying spiritual intelligence:

1. Self-awareness: Knowing what I believe in and value, and what deeply motivates me.
2. Spontaneity: Living in and being responsive to the moment.
3. Being vision- and value-led: Acting from principles and deep beliefs, and living accordingly.
4. Holism: Seeing larger patterns, relationships, and connections; having a sense of belonging.
5. Compassion: Having the quality of "feeling-with" and deep empathy.
6. Celebration of diversity: Valuing other people for their differences, not despite them.
7. Field independence: Standing against the crowd and having one's own convictions.
8. Humility: Having the sense of being a player in a larger drama, of one's true place in the world.
9. Tendency to ask fundamental "Why?" questions: Needing to understand things and get to the bottom of them.
10. Ability to reframe: Standing back from a situation or problem and seeing the bigger picture or wider context.
11. Positive use of adversity: Learning and growing from mistakes, setbacks, and suffering.
12. Sense of vocation: Feeling called upon to serve, to give something back.

Ken O'Donnell, advocates the integration of spiritual intelligence (SQ) with both rational intelligence (IQ) and emotional intelligence (EQ). IQ helps us to interact with numbers, formulas and things, EQ helps us to interact with people and SQ helps us to maintain inner balance. To calculate one's level of SQ he suggests the following criteria:

1. How much time, money and energy and thoughts do we need to obtain a desired result.
2. How much bilateral respect there exists in our relationships.
3. How "clean" a game we play with others.
4. How much dignity we retain in respecting the dignity of others.
5. How tranquil we remain in spite of the workload.
6. How sensible our decisions are.
7. How stable we remain in upsetting situations.
8. How easily we see virtues in others instead of defects.

Robert Emmons defines spiritual intelligence as "the adaptive use of spiritual information to facilitate everyday problem solving and goal attainment." He originally proposed 5 components of spiritual intelligence:

1. The capacity to transcend the physical and material.
2. The ability to experience heightened states of consciousness.
3. The ability to sanctify everyday experience.
4. The ability to utilize spiritual resources to solve problems.
5. The capacity to be virtuous.

The fifth capacity was later removed due to its focus on human behavior rather than ability, thereby not meeting previously established scientific criteria for intelligence.

Frances Vaughan offers the following description: "Spiritual intelligence is concerned with the inner life of mind and spirit and its relationship to being in the world."

Cindy Wigglesworth defines spiritual intelligence as "the ability to act with wisdom and compassion, while maintaining inner and outer peace, regardless of the circumstances." She breaks down the competencies that comprise SQ into 21 skills, arranged into a four quadrant model similar to Daniel Goleman's widely used model of emotional intelligence or EQ. The four quadrants of spiritual intelligence are defined as:

1. Higher Self / Ego self Awareness
2. Universal Awareness
3. Higher Self / Ego self Mastery
4. Spiritual Presence / Social Mastery

Yosi Amram defines spiritual intelligence as “the ability to apply and embody spiritual resources and qualities to enhance daily functioning and wellbeing.” Based on interviews with seventy-one spiritual leaders nominated by their peers, his ecumenical grounded theory of spiritual intelligence as presented at the 115th Annual Conference of the American Psychological Association highlights seven major themes that are universal across the world’s spiritual and wisdom traditions. They are:

1. Consciousness: Possessing developed, refined awareness and self-knowledge.
2. Grace: Living in alignment with the sacred, manifesting love for and trust in life.
3. Meaning: Experiencing significance in daily activities through a sense of purpose and a call for service, including in the face of pain and suffering.
4. Transcendence: Identifying beyond the separate egoic self into an interconnected wholeness.
5. Truth: Living in open acceptance, curiosity, and love for all creation (all that is).
6. Serenity: Surrendering peacefully to Self (Truth, God, Absolute, true nature).
7. Inner-Directedness: Maintaining inner-freedom aligned with responsible, wise action.

David B. King has undertaken research on spiritual intelligence at Trent University in Peterborough, Ontario, Canada. King defines spiritual intelligence as a set of adaptive mental capacities based on non-material and transcendent aspects of reality, specifically those that:

"...contribute to the awareness, integration, and adaptive application of the nonmaterial and transcendent aspects of one's existence, leading to such outcomes as deep existential reflection, enhancement of meaning, recognition of a transcendent self, and mastery of spiritual states."

King further proposes four core abilities or capacities of spiritual intelligence:

1. Critical Existential Thinking: The capacity to critically contemplate the nature of existence, reality, the universe, space, time, and other existential/metaphysical issues; also the capacity to contemplate non-existential issues in relation to one's existence (i.e., from an existential perspective).
2. Personal Meaning Production: The ability to derive personal meaning and purpose from all physical and mental experiences, including the capacity to create and master a life purpose.
3. Transcendental Awareness: The capacity to identify transcendent dimensions/patterns of the self (i.e., a transpersonal or transcendent self), of others, and of the physical world (e.g., nonmaterialism) during normal states of consciousness, accompanied by the capacity to identify their relationship to one's self and to the physical.
4. Conscious State Expansion: The ability to enter and exit higher states of consciousness (e.g. pure consciousness, cosmic consciousness, unity, oneness) and other states of trance at one's own discretion (as in deep contemplation, meditation, prayer, etc.).

Also, Vineeth V. Kumar and Manju Mehta have also researched the concept extensively. Operationalizing the construct, they defined spiritual intelligence as "the capacity of an individual to possess a socially relevant purpose in life by understanding 'self' and having a high degree of conscience, compassion and commitment to human values."

== Measuring ==
Measurement of spiritual intelligence often relies on self-reporting. Yosi Amram and Christopher Dryer developed and validated the Integrated Spiritual Intelligence Scale (ISIS)—a self-report measure of spiritual intelligence (also applied as a 360-assessment measure), which showed satisfactory factor structure, internal consistency, test-retest reliability, and construct validity. Applications of the ISIS by other researchers has shown that “the reliability of ISIS was high (i.e., Cronbach’s alpha = 0.97)” and that there was "a significant positive relationship between employees’ spiritual intelligence and work satisfaction.” It consists of twenty-two sub-scales assessing separate SI capabilities related to Beauty, Discernment, Egolessness, Equanimity, Freedom, Gratitude, Higher-self, Holism, Immanence, Inner-wholeness, Intuition, Joy, Mindfulness, Openness, Practice, Presence, Purpose, Relatedness, Sacredness, Service, Synthesis, and Trust. These twenty-two sub-scales are grouped into five domains: Consciousness, Grace, Meaning, Transcendence and Truth. ISIS has since been translated into several other languages and validated by other researchers.

David King and Teresa L. DeCicco have developed a self-report measure, the Spiritual Intelligence Self-Report Inventory (SISRI-24) with psychometric and statistical support across two large university samples. Cindy Wigglesworth has developed the SQ21, a self-assessment inventory that has tested positively for criterion validity and construct validity in statistically significant samples. Wigglesworth's SQ model and assessment instrument have been successfully used in corporate settings.

The Scale for Spiritual Intelligence (SSI; Kumar & Mehta, 2011) is a 20-item, self-report measure of spiritual intelligence in adolescents. The idea behind the development of this scale was to generate and assess the concept of spiritual intelligence in the collectivist culture bounded with eastern philosophy. The SSI is rated on a Likert scale and can be completed in 10 minutes.

The 29-item Spiritual Intelligence Questionnaire: This test was normalized by Abdollahzadeh (2008) with the collaboration of Mahdieh Kashmiri and Fatemeh Arabameri on students. The normal group was 280 people, 200 of whom were the students of Gorgan University of Natural Resources and 80 students of Payame Noor University of Behshahr. Of these, 184 were female and 96 were male. First, a 30-item questionnaire was prepared by the test developers and implemented on 30 students.The reliability of the test in the initial phase was 0.87 by the alpha method. In the analysis of the question by Loop method, 12 questions were removed and the final questionnaire was adjusted with 29 phrases. At the final stage, the questionnaire was implemented on 280 subjects and the reliability was 0.89 at this stage. Factor analysis was used to evaluate validity in addition to formal content validity that the questions were confirmed by the experts (colleagues) and the correlation of all questions was higher than 0.3. In Varimax rotation, two major factors were found to reduce variables. The first factor with 12 question was called "understanding and communicating with the source of universe” and the second factor with 17 items was called “spiritual life or reliance on the inner core." The first factor included the questions 1, 4, 5, 7, 8, 9, 11, 15, 16, 24, 27, 29 and the second factor included the questions 2, 3, 6, 10, 12, 13, 14, 17, 18, 19, 20, 21, 22, 23, 25, 26, 28.

== Criticisms ==
It has been argued that Spiritual Intelligence cannot be recognized as a form of intelligence. Howard Gardner chose not to include spiritual intelligence amongst his intelligences due to the challenge of codifying quantifiable scientific criteria. Later, Gardner suggested an "existential intelligence" as viable, but argued that it was better to

"put aside the term spiritual, with its manifest and problematic connotations, and to speak instead of an intelligence that explores the nature of existence in its multifarious guises. Thus, an explicit concern with spiritual or religious matters would be one variety — often the most important variety — of an existential intelligence."

== See also ==
- Intelligence
- Intelligence quotient
- Emotional intelligence
- Multiple intelligences
- Spirituality
- Trance
