= Dannah =

Dannah is a feminine given name. Notable people with the name include:

- Dannah Gresh (born 1967), American author and speaker
- Dannah Phirman (born 1975), American actress, comedian, and writer

== See also ==
- Danah
- Dana (disambiguation)
- Daynah
