= Daan (given name) =

Daan is a Dutch masculine given name, short for Daniël. In the Netherlands, it has increased significantly in popularity as a birth name since 1970. People with the name include:

- Daan Bekker (1932–2009), South African boxer
- Daan den Bleijker (1928–2003), Dutch footballer
- Daan Blij (born 1993), Dutch footballer
- Daan Boerlage (born 1997), Dutch footballer
- Daan Bovenberg (born 1988), Dutch footballer
- Daan Brandenburg (born 1987), Dutch chess grandmaster
- Daan Breeuwsma (born 1987), Dutch short-track speed skater
- Daan Buijze (born 1928), Dutch swimmer
- Daan van Bunge (born 1982), Dutch cricketer
- Daan de Clercq (1854–1931), Dutch socialist and activist
- Daan De Cooman (born 1974), Belgian judoka
- Daan De Pever (born 1989), Belgian footballer
- Daan van Dijk (1907–1986), Dutch track cyclist
- Daan van Dinter (born 1989), Dutch footballer
- Daan Disveld (born 1994), Dutch footballer
- Daan Frenkel (born 1948), Dutch computational physicist
- Daan Van Gijseghem (born 1988), Belgian footballer
- Daan van Golden (1936–2017), Dutch artist
- Daan Goulooze (1901–1965), Dutch communist and World War II resistance fighter
- Daan de Groot (1933–1982), Dutch cyclist
- Daan van Haarlem (born 1989), Dutch volleyball player
- Daan Heymans (born 1999), Belgian footballer
- Daan Huiskamp (born 1985), Dutch footballer
- Daan Huizing (born 1990), Dutch golfer
- Daan Human (born 1976), South African rugby player
- Daan Janzing (born 1981), Dutch rock guitarist
- Daan Jippes (born 1945), Dutch comics artists
- Daan Kagchelland (1914–1998), Dutch Olympic sailor
- Daan Klinkenberg (born 1996), Dutch footballer
- Daan Klomp (born 1998), Dutch footballer
- Daan Luijkx (born 1966), Dutch cyclist
- Daan Manneke (born 1939), Dutch composer and organist
- Daan Mogot (1928–1946), Indonesian freedom fighter during World War II
- Daan Monjé (1925–1986), Dutch politician and activist
- Daan Myngheer (1993–2016), Belgian cyclist
- Daan Nieber (born 1980), Dutch journalist
- Daan Noppen (born 1977), Dutch draftsman and photographer
- Daan Olivier (born 1992), Dutch cyclist
- Daan Paau (born 1985), Dutch footballer
- Daan Remmerts de Vries (born 1962), Dutch writer
- Daan Rienstra (born 1992), Dutch footballer
- Daan Romers (born 1985), Dutch DJ known as Dannic
- Daan Roosegaarde (born 1979), Dutch installation artist
- Daan Samson (born 1973), Dutch installation and performance artist
- Daan Schuurmans (born 1972), Dutch movie actor
- Daan Soete (born 1994), Dutch cyclo-cross cyclist
- Daan Stuyven (born 1969), Flemish singer and guitarist
- Daan Vaesen (born 1981), Belgian footballer
- Daan Viljoen (1892–1972), Governor of South West Africa 1953–1963, after whom Daan Viljoen Game Reserve was named
- Daan Zwierink (born 1998), Dutch pop singer
