= Tarḫunz =

Luwian deity

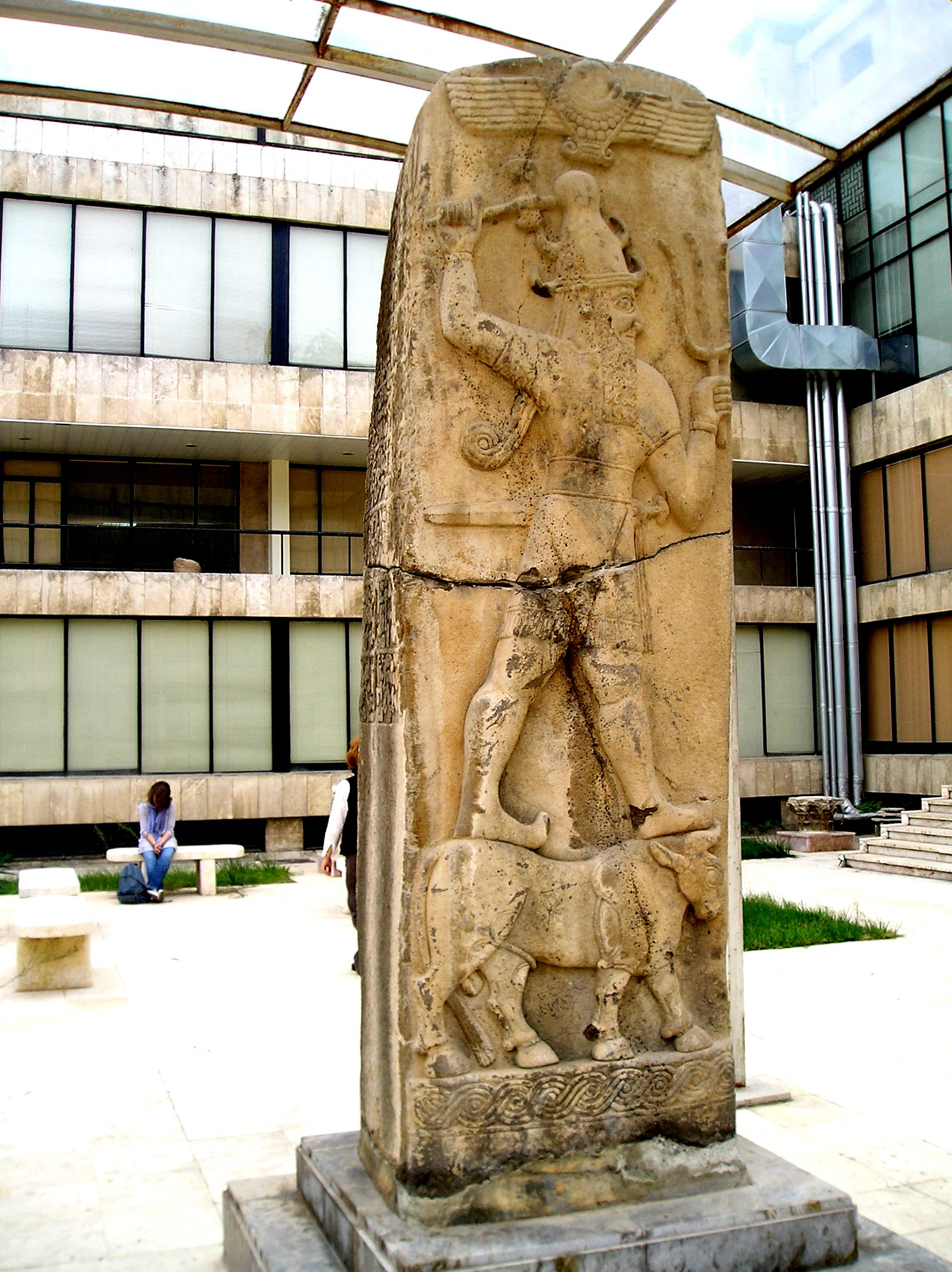
Tarhunza of Aleppo

Tarḫunz (stem: Tarḫunt-) was the weather god and chief god of the Luwians, a people of Bronze Age and early Iron Age Anatolia. He is closely associated with the Hittite god Tarḫunna and the Hurrian god Teshub.

== Name ==
The name of the Proto-Anatolian weather god can be reconstructed as *Tṛḫu-ent- ("conquering"), a participle form of the Proto-Indo-European root *terh_{2}, "to cross over, pass through, overcome". It has cognates in Hittite tarḫu-, Latin trans-, Dutch door, German durch, and English through. The same name was used in almost all Anatolian languages: Hittite Tarḫunna-; Carian Trquδ-; Milyan Trqqñt-, and Lycian: Trqqas (A), Trqqiz (B), who has been identified with Zeus.

Norbert Oettinger has argued that the functions of the Anatolian weather god ultimately come from the Proto-Indo-European deity *Perkʷūnos, but a new epithet *Tṛḫu-ent- ("conquering") was coined that sounded close to the name of the Hattian storm god Taru.

In Luwian cuneiform of the Bronze Age, his name appears as Tarḫunt- (Tarḫuwant- in the oldest texts). He is also named using the Sumerograms ^{d}U ("God 10") or ^{d}IM ("God Wind"). In hieroglyphic Luwian, his name was written as Tarhunza- and Tarhunta- or with the ideograms (DEUS) TONITRUS ("God Thunder").

The name Tarhunt- is also cognate to the present participle turvant-, also meaning "vanquishing, conquering", an epithet of Vedic deity Indra.

=== Onomastic legacy ===
The god's name often appears in personal names. The oldest example is "Tarḫuan", known from a 19th-century BC Hittite text from Kültepe. Among the Luwians, it was customary for people to bear a simple god's name, but names were often combined. In the Bronze Age and Early Iron Age, these names are very common. The latest examples derive from Hellenistic southern Anatolia, like Tarkumbios (Ταρκυμβίος, luw. *Tarhun-piya- "Tarhun-Gift“) or Trokombigremis (Τροκομβίγρεμις; *Tarhun-pihra-mi- "Shining Tarhun") which are attested in Cilicia.

Further attestations of the deity's name appear as Tarhundaradu, a king of Arzawa, and variation Tarhunnaradu, believed to be the Hittite version of the former, and both referring to the same person, attested in the Ortaköy Letters. In a 2022 paper, scholar Ignasi Xavier Adiego postulates the existence of "four different Luwian (and Luwic) stems: Tarhu̯ant-/Tarhunt-, Tarhun-, Tarhu- and Tarhunza". In addition, following Starke, he adduces further onomastic evidence, namely, a royal scribe's name Tarḫu(n)mii̯a, Cilician names Ταρκυννις, Ταρκυμ-βιας, Τροκον-βιας, Τροκομ-βιγρεμις, Τροκον-γιλανις; and a Lycian name Τροκομ-μας.

The Hittite city Tarḫuntašša was named after the god.

== Description ==
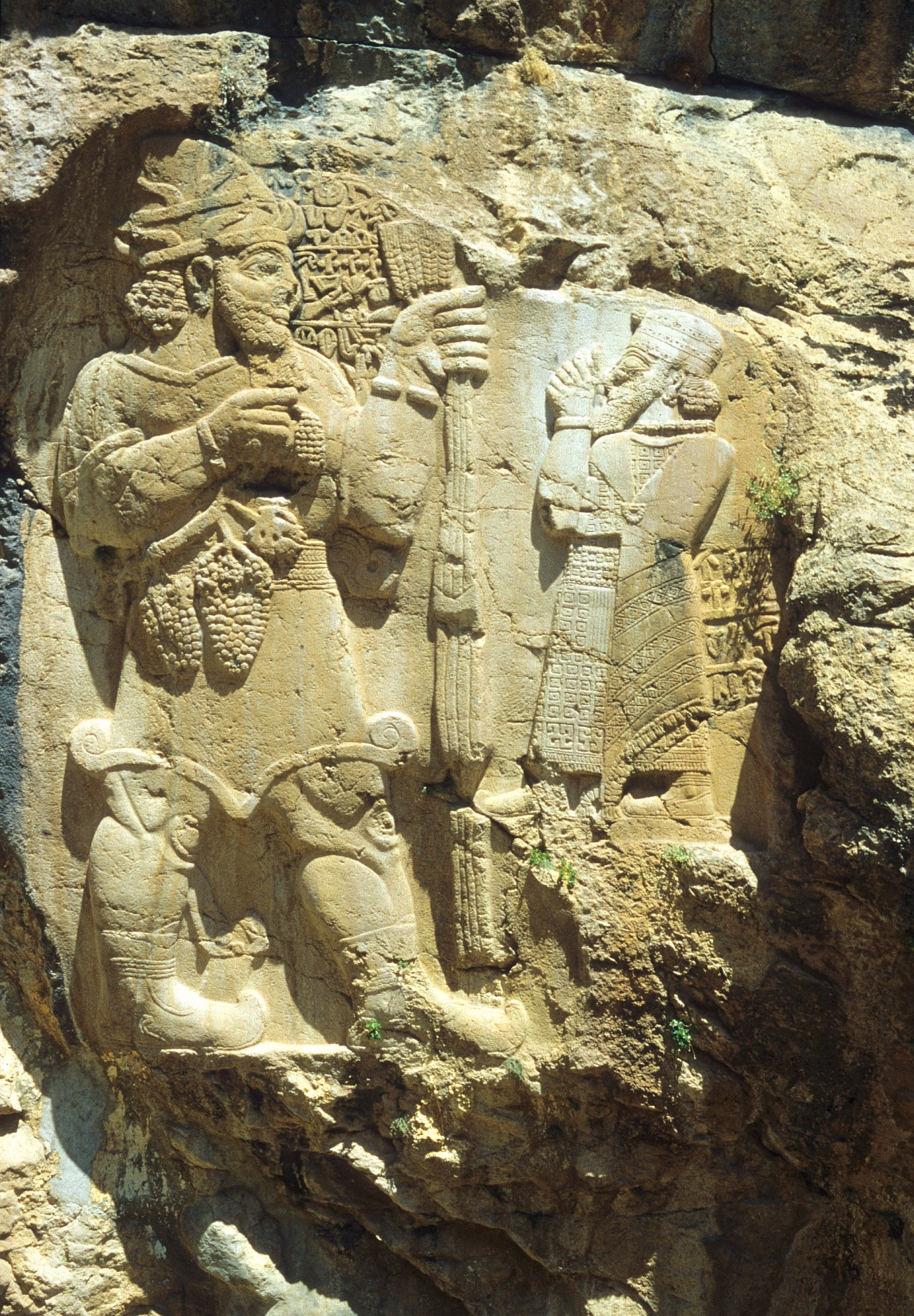
Tarhunza of the vineyard; İvriz relief

The Luwian weather god retained his Indo-European roots more clearly than the Hittite weather god Tarḫunna. Thus, he was less closely linked with the bull, which was common in Anatolia, than with the horse. According to the ritual against horse-plague of Uḫḫamuwa in Arzawa, the horses of the weather god were fed and his chariot was oiled with sheep fat.

The various Luwian epithets of Tarhunz indicate his functions. He was 'powerful' (cuneiform: ^{d}U muwatalla/i-; hieroglyphic: muwatalis Tarhunz) and 'helpful' (cuneiform: ^{d}U warraḫitaššaš; "Tarhunz the Helper"), but also 'stern' (cuneiform: tapattanašši- ^{d}U). Thus, in Iron Age depictions, Tarhunz is shown slaying enemies with his axe. In battle he rushed ahead of the king, ensuring victory, and he could therefore be referred to as "Tarhunz of the (battle)field" (cuneiform: immarašša- ^{d}IM) or "Tarhunz of the commander" (hieroglyphic: kuwalanassis Tarhunz). The weather god is also connected with mountains (cuneiform: ariyattališ ^{d}IM-anz; hieroglyphic: aritalasis Tarhunz; "Mountain-Tarhunz"). In Iron Age Carchemish, there was a cult of Tarhunz of Mount Arputa (Arputawanis Tarhunz). As a sky god, he was referred to as Tarhunz of the Heavens. As a shining or lightning-wielding god he bore the epithets piḫaimiš ("flashing, shining") and piḫaššaššiš ("of the thunderbolt, of the flash"). The name of the winged horse Pegasus in Greek mythology is derived from this last epithet.

=== Personal god of Muwatalli II ===
The Hittite Great King Muwatalli II named the weather god of the thunderbolt (^{d}U piḫaššaššiš) as his protective deity, calling him "weather god of the thunderbolt, my lord, king of heaven." By his account, the god raised him and installed him as king of the Hittite realm. His prayer to the god shows Luwian characteristics:

"Weather god of the thunderbolt, glow on me like the moonlight, shine over me like the son god of heaven!"
(KUB 6.45 iii 68-70)

=== Tarhunz of the vineyard ===
A Luwian innovation is the idea of the weather god of the vineyard. He is first attested in a southern Anatolian vineyard ritual from the 16th century BC, in which he is called upon to make the royal vineyard thrive, along with the goddess Mamma and other divine couples, like Runtiya and Ala or Telipinu and Maliya.

During the Iron Age, Tarhunz of the vineyard (turwarasina Tarhunza) was worshipped with particular intensity in Tabal. King Warpalawas II of Tuwana (2nd half of the 8th century BC) had an imposing rock relief with a depiction of this aspect of the god erected near a productive spring at İvriz. Tarhunz is depicted as a bearded god with curly hair and a helmet. He wears a knee-length skirt and a belt, but no sword. In his left hand he holds a bunch of grapes and ears of wheat in his right hand. Animals were offered to him and in return "Plenty came down from the heavens and plenty came up from the earth." In Sam'al he appears in an Aramaic version as Hadad of the vineyard (hdd krmn 'Hadad Karmîn').

== Cult sites ==
Already in the early Bronze Age, Aleppo (Halpa) was a major city of the weather god. With the conquest of Syria by Suppiluliuma I (1355-1325 BC), this city was incorporated into the Hittite realm and Suppiluliuma installed his son Telipinu as priest-king of Aleppo. The temple of the weather god of Aleppo was adjusted to conform to Hittite cult. During the Iron Age, a new temple was dedicated to Tarhunz of Halpa.

== Dragon slayer ==
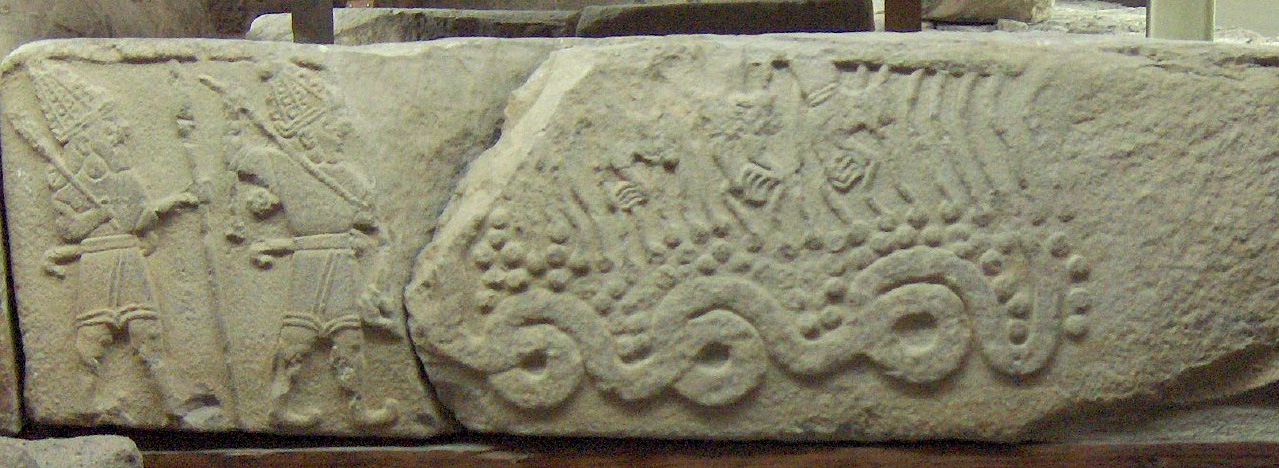
Late Luwian relief from Arslantepe with the weather god and a companion battling a serpent monster

In a relief from Arslantepe, the weather god and a companion are shown battling against a snake-like water creature. This depiction recalls the Hittite Illuyanka and Hurrian Ḫedammu, a myth which is widespread in Proto-Indo-European religion and in the Near East.

The Anatolian myth was taken over into Greek mythology, in which Zeus battles with the dragon-like Typhon. It has been suggested that the myth was taken over from Cilicia in particular, since there was intensive contact between Greeks and Anatolians there from a very early date. The key locations of the myth also point in this direction: Mount Kasios in northwestern Syria and the area around Corycus in Rough Cilicia, where Luwian religion endured into the Roman period.

== Depiction ==
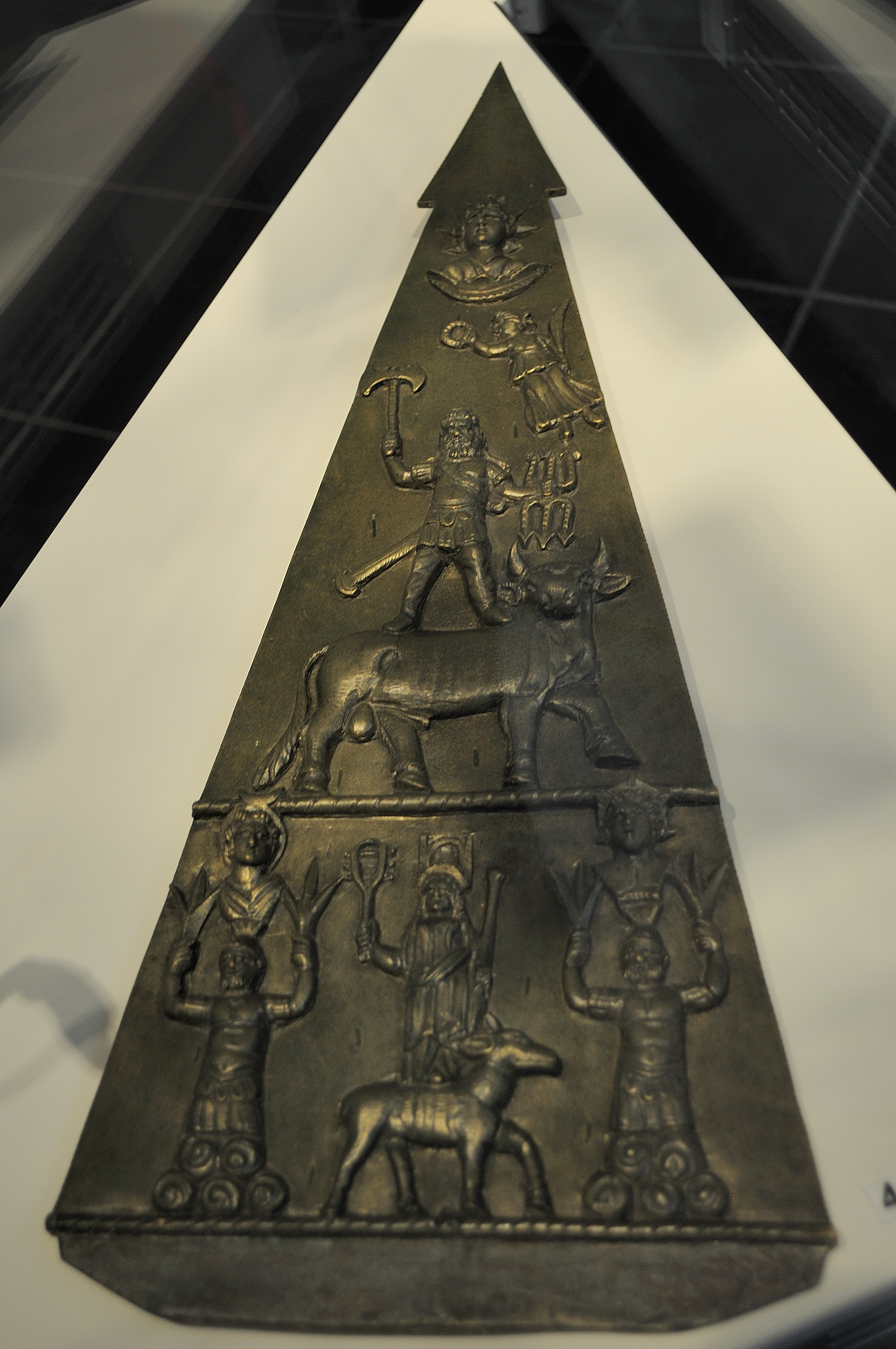
Jupiter Dolichenus of Heddernheim

There are no depictions from the Bronze Age that can be identified as the Luwian weather god. However, over sixty reliefs and statues of the weather god are known from the Iron Age. These can be divided into three types.

In the first type of depiction, he is shown as a bearded god with a horned helmet, short skirt, and a sword hanging from his belt. In the rear hand he holds an axe and in the front hand he holds a thunderbolt. A winged sun may be depicted above his head, indicating his divine authority.

The second type depicts him similarly, but standing atop a bull. This image was used for the weather god of Aleppo, which exercised a strong influence over perceptions of Tarhunz in Syria. This depiction disappeared in the 7th century BC, but reappeared in Northern Syria at the beginning of the Roman Imperial period and was brought to central Europe as Jupiter Dolichenus, whose cult centre lay in Doliche, northwest of Carchemish. The bronze triangle of Heddernheim, in particular, shows obvious similarities to the Luwian depiction of Tarhunz in Northern Syria.

The third type shows the weather god with ears of corn and bunches of grapes. This type is common in Tabal (Anatolia). The aforementioned İvriz relief is the best known example. This version of Tarhunz may be depicted unarmed or shown with an axe or thunderbolt.

=== Depictions of Tarhunz ===
- Adıyaman 1 Stele: inscription, probably of Suppiluliuma
- Adıyaman 2 Stele: inscription of Lakawani
- Çineköy inscription: inscription of Awariku
- Gökbez relief: no inscription
- İvriz relief: inscription of Warpalawas II
- Keşlik Stele: illegible inscription
- Kürtül Stele: inscription of La
- Niğde Stele: inscription of Muwaharani II

== See also ==
- Ninurta
- Perkūnas
- Perun
- Taranis
- Tarchon
- Tarḫunna
- Teshub
- Thor

== Bibliography ==
- Haas, Volkert (1994). Geschichte der hethitischen Religion. Handbuch der Orientalistik. Vol. 1. Leiden: Brill. ISBN 978-9-004-09799-5.
- Hutter, Manfred (2003). "Aspects of Luwian Religion". In H. Craig Melchert (ed.). The Luwians. Handbuch der Orientalistik. Vol. 1. Leiden: Brill. pp. 211–280. doi:10.1163/9789047402145_007. ISBN 90-04-13009-8.
- Houwink ten Cate, Philo Hendrik Jan (1961). The Luwian Population Groups of Lycia and Cilicia Aspera During the Hellenistic Period. Leiden: E. J. Brill.
