= Eutherios of Tyana =

Bishop in Turkey (florit 431)

Eutherios of Tyana, metropolitan bishop of Tyana (site near Niğde, Turkey) in Cappadocia, features in the context of the Council of Ephesus (431), where he belonged to the eastern delegation led by John of Antioch. Dismayed by the deposition of his fellow exponent of the School of Antioch, Nestorius, precipitated by Cyril of Alexandria's vigorous objection to the Christotokos (instead of Theotokos) expression which Nestorius used, Eutherius writes a lively text of protest, which in turn brings about his own deposition and exile, initially at Scythopolis in Palestine. John of Antioch, in the Act of Union of 433, reconciled with Cyril and pursued a policy of abandoning some of the positions he had once held and repression of those who continued to express them. His successor and nephew, Domnus II of Antioch, however, advocated conciliation, and Eutherius was able to escape from Scythopolis and take refuge with Irenaeus, the new bishop of Tyre (who as a senior civil servant (comes) had been involved at a key level in the organisation of the Ephesus council and as go-between for the delegations and Emperor Theodosius II, and whose pro-oriental sympathies had led to a term of exile in Petra).

The text of the Protest appears to have survived largely through attribution to Athanasius of Alexandria. In the way of attestation Patriarch Photios I of Constantinople in his Bibliotheca is closer to the mark in ascribing it to Theodoret. Euthymios Zigabenos cites without naming an author, but Severus of Antioch in his Contra Impium Grammaticum quotes from with attribution to Eutherius of Tyana. (Both the latter authors are referring to chapter 20, which together with 21 may well constitute a slightly later addition by Eutherius to his original text).

The Protest (Antilogia) against those who advocate a suffering God (Theopaschism) is written in a clear and vigorous style using various rhetorical devices (formulae, punch-lines, diatribe, metaphor - e.g. in chapter 20, reaching a safe harbour after the risk of piracy) and attempting to expose the absurdity of his Alexandrian school opponents' arguments. He uses the terminology derived from Theodore of Mopsuestia and Nestorios, e.g. sunapheia. Minor incoherences (e.g. in referencing scriptural quotations) do not essentially compromise the high quality of his expression. Coherence, or rather the incoherence of the opposition's reasoning, is a recurring theme. Such qualities ensure that this work is no ordinary pamphlet.

Eutherius' attitude to the Jews is interesting: like John Chrysostom, he rejects Judaism and he reproaches Jews for failing to discern the signs of divinity performed by Christ, but this very ignorance clears them of the charge of deicide, and in any case, he states that Christ has pronounced forgiveness.

Eutherius' other surviving work consists of five letters preserved in Latin in the Collectio Casinensis (Letters 162, 163, 204, 205, 291), 4 addressed to fellow Antiochene theologian bishops, John of Antioch, Helladius of Tarsus, Alexander of Hierapolis together with Theodoret of Cyrrhus, Alexander of Hierapolis individually, and one to Pope Sixtus III in Rome.
