= Danna =

Danna may refer to:

== People ==
- Danna (name), a given name and a surname, including a list of people with the name
- Danna Paola (born 1995), also known mononymously as Danna, Mexican singer and actress

== Places ==
- Danna (Biblical place), identified with Idna in Palestine
- Danna, Baysan, a former Palestinian village
- Danna, Mansehra, Pakistan
- Island of Danna, Scotland

== Other uses ==
- Danna (Geisha patron), in Japanese society
- Danna (Mesopotamian), a unit of time
- Danna Student Center, a building complex at the Loyola University New Orleans

== See also ==
- D'Anna, a name
- Dana (disambiguation)
