= Dana, Ethiopia =

Village in Ethiopia

Dana
- Village
- Location with in Ethiopia
- Coordinates: 11°49′0″N 39°46′12″E
- Country: Ethiopia
- Region: Amhara
- Zone: North Wollo Zone
- District: Habru
- Elevation: 1,600 m (5,200 ft)
- Time zone: GMT +3

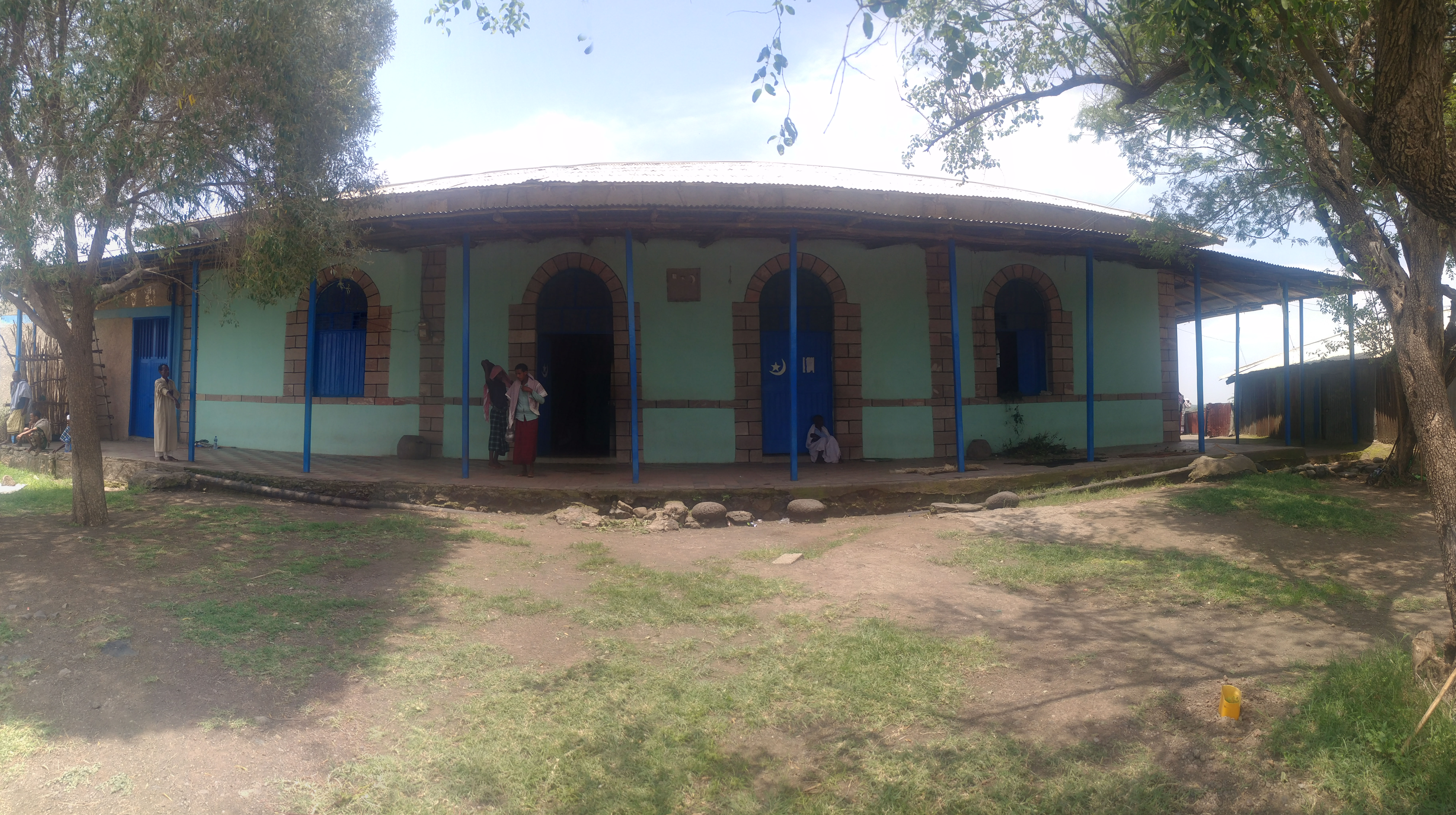
Mosque in Dana

Dana (in Amharic: ዳና) is a village located 38 km away from Weldiya town in the district of Habru, North Wollo Zone of Amhara Region, Ethiopia.

It was one of the 19th century famous Islamic educations and sufi order centers in Wollo where prominent Islamic scholars such as Shaykh Daniy al-Awal, Shaykh Daniy al-Thani, and Shaykh Mohammed Zayn successively administered the center and taught many Muslim scholars. The center was founded by, Shaykh Ahmad b. Adam, commonly known as Daniyy al-Awwal, which implies the first Shaykh of Dana.
