= Mount Dana (disambiguation) =

Mount Dana is a mountain on the boundary between Yosemite National Park and Ansel Adams Wilderness in California.

Mount Dana may also refer to:

- Mount Dana (Alaska)
- Mount Dana (Washington)

== See also ==
- Dana Mountains, Antarctica
- Dana Butte, in the Grand Canyon
