= Daan Noppen =

Dutch artist (born 1977)

- Born: 14 January 1977 (age 49); Arnhem, Netherlands
- Known for: Drawing, Photography
- Website: daannoppen.com

Daan Noppen (Arnhem, 14 January 1977 – lives and works in Amsterdam) is a Dutch contemporary artist mainly working in drawing and photography. He is best known for his realistic larger than life drawings of portraits and bodies.

== Exhibitions ==
Daan Noppen's work has been exhibited in:

2015

- Duo show together with Raphael Hermans, Compagnie theater, Amsterdam

2013

- Artist in residence The Nationale Reisopera, Enschede, Netherlands
- Group show Galerie14, Luxembourg city, Luxembourg

2012

- North Faces, Lele Gallery, Metz, France
- LC Projects Brooklyn, NY, United States

2008

- Arteamericas, Miami Beach FL, United States; Art fair with Hardcore gallery
- Arti08, The Hague, Netherlands
- Prinsengracht 88, Amsterdam, Group Photography exhibition
- Museo Ciudad de Mexico, Mexico City, Mexico; PUI Mexico
- Centro de Desarrollo de las Artes Visuales, Havana, (Cuba) PUI Cuba

2007

- Moore space, Miami, United States; (re-) Creating History, by Allard van Hoorn (collaboration on project)
- Artemis, Amsterdam, Netherlands
- Behance

2006

- Gallery Apart, Amsterdam, Netherlands
- Island 6, Shanghai, China; Hidden Layers, Electric Cities
- Club 11, Amsterdam, Netherlands

2005

- n8, Amsterdam, Netherlands
