= D'Anna =

D'Anna or D'anna is a name. People and fictional characters with the name include:

== People with the surname ==
- Baldassare d'Anna (c.1560 – after 1639), Italian painter
- Claude d'Anna (born 1945), French film director and screenwriter
- Divina D'Anna (born 1976), Australian politician
- Emanuele D'Anna (born 1982), Italian footballer
- Lorenzo D'Anna (born 1972), Italian footballer
- Lynnette D'anna (born 1955), Canadian writer
- Michael D'Anna (born 1972), American film director
- Vito D'Anna (1718–1769), Italian painter

== People with the given name ==
- D'Anna Fortunato (born 1945), American mezzo-soprano opera singer

== Fictional characters ==
- D'Anna Biers, or Number Three, a Battlestar Galactica (2004 TV series) character

== See also ==
- The dictionary definition of D'Anna at Wiktionary
- Danna (disambiguation)
- Deanna
