= Daan Viljoen Game Reserve =

Nature reserve in Namibia

Coordinates: 22°32′S 16°58′E

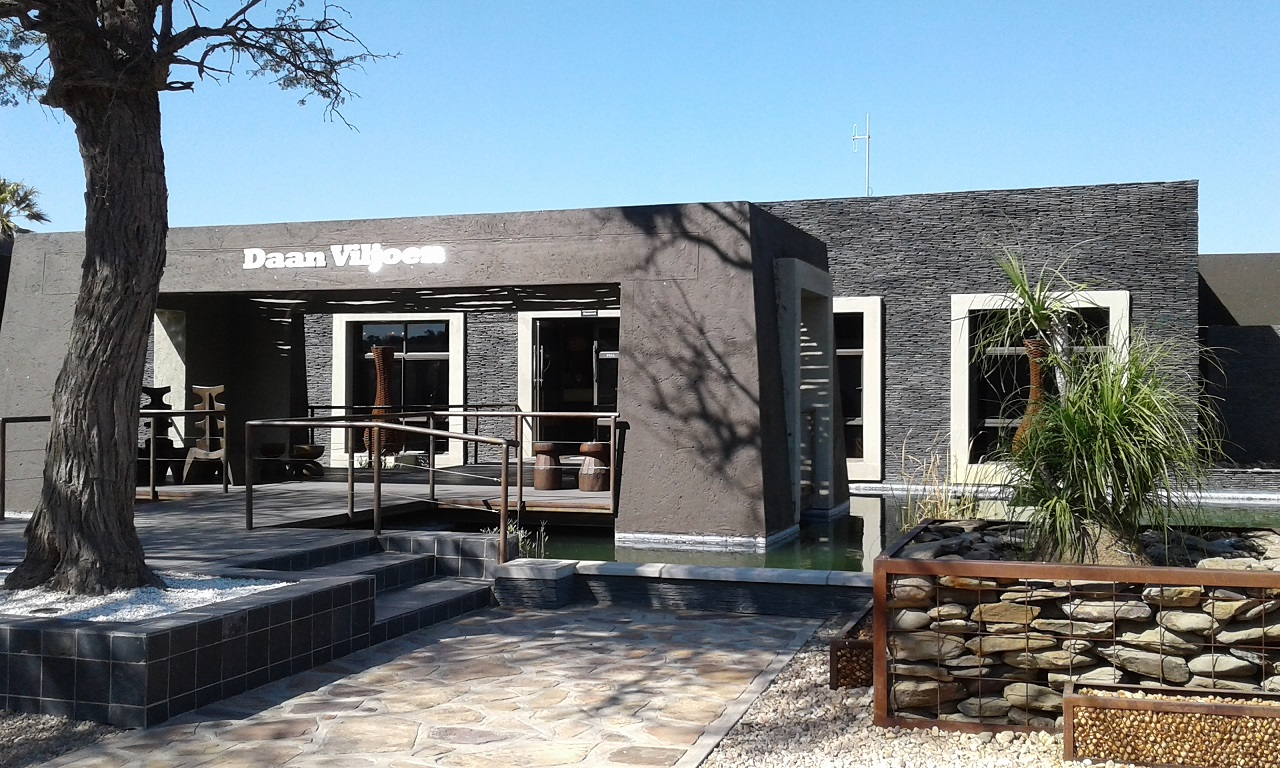
Daan Viljoen Nature Reserve, main building, 2017

Daan Viljoen Game Reserve is a game reserve near Windhoek, Namibia. It is situated in the hill area of Khomas Hochland. The park has many walking paths and allows tourists to travel around by themselves. The park is a good example of the wildlife of Namibia. It is named for Daniel Thomas du Plessis Viljoen (1892–1972), the South African administrator of South West Africa from 1953 to 1963. It was during his administration that the rest camp was opened in 1962.

The park covers an area of 40 square kilometers, and provides a home to many plant and animal species.

The park contains a lodge with swimming pool and restaurant as well as a camping site. Those are run by Sunkarros Lifestyle Safaris and are not open to park day visitors.
