= SS Dana (1883) =

British cargo ship that was torpedoed in the North Sea

History
- Name: (United Kingdom) SS Clieveden (1883-1911); (Sweden) SS Dana (1911-1917)
- Owner: Gohle R.
- Port of registry: Norrköping, Sweden
- Builder: Blumer, John & Co.
- Yard number: 83
- Launched: 3 November 1883
- Completed: 1883
- Identification: 5240
- Fate: Torpedoed and sunk 11 November 1917

General characteristics
- Type: Cargo Ship
- Tonnage: 1,621 GRT
- Length: 78.6 metres (257 ft 10 in)
- Beam: 11 metres (36 ft 1 in)
- Depth: 3.3 metres (10 ft 10 in)
- Installed power: Steam Compound engine
- Propulsion: Screw propeller

SS Dana was a British cargo ship that was torpedoed by SM UC-47 in the North Sea 14 nautical miles (26 km) off Hornsea, United Kingdom, while she was travelling from Gothenburg, Sweden to Hull, United Kingdom.

== Construction ==
Dana was constructed in 1883 at the Blumer, John & Co. shipyard in Sunderland, United Kingdom. She was completed in 1883 and she was named Dana and served from 1883 until her demise in 1917. The ship was 78.6 metres (257 ft 10 in) long, with a beam of 11 metres (36 ft 1 in) and a depth of 3.3 metres (10 ft 10 in). The ship was assessed at 1,621 GRT. She had a steam compound engine driving a single screw propeller and 2 single boilers, a new donkey boiler was fitted 1904. The engine was rated at 178 nhp.

== Sinking ==
On 11 November 1917, Dana was on a voyage from Gothenburg, Sweden to Hull, United Kingdom when she was torpedoed by the German submarine SM UC-47 in the North Sea 14 nautical miles (26 km) off Hornsea, United Kingdom. There were 8 casualties, including Captain Anders Rasmusson.

== Wreck ==
The wreck was discovered in 1982 and lies upright on a sandy seabed. She has broken in several pieces with the crank all open, the machinery lies amidships.
