= İvriz monuments =

Hittite rock relief in south-central Anatolia

İvriz relief
- Location within Turkey
- 37°24′35″N 34°10′21″E
- Type: Rock relief
- Location: Turkey
- Region: Konya Province

The İvriz monuments are a group of Hittite monuments found in south-central Anatolia, located in the town of Aydınkent, formerly called İvriz (modern Turkey, Konya Province, about 17 km south-east of the modern town of Ereğli).

The primary rock relief (İvriz 1), often known simply as the İvriz relief, is a rock relief on a rock face near the source of the İvriz Suyu, whose water has damaged the relief in modern times. It depicts the late 8th-century BC king Warpalawas and the storm-god Tarhunzas and is accompanied by a hieroglyphic Luwian inscription. Two further, uninscribed, reliefs were subsequently discovered.

An inscribed stele (İvriz 2), also known as the İvriz stele, was found in 1986 containing both a Luwian inscription and a Phoenician inscription.

One of the reliefs and the stele are in the Konya Ereğli Museum.

== İvriz 1 ==
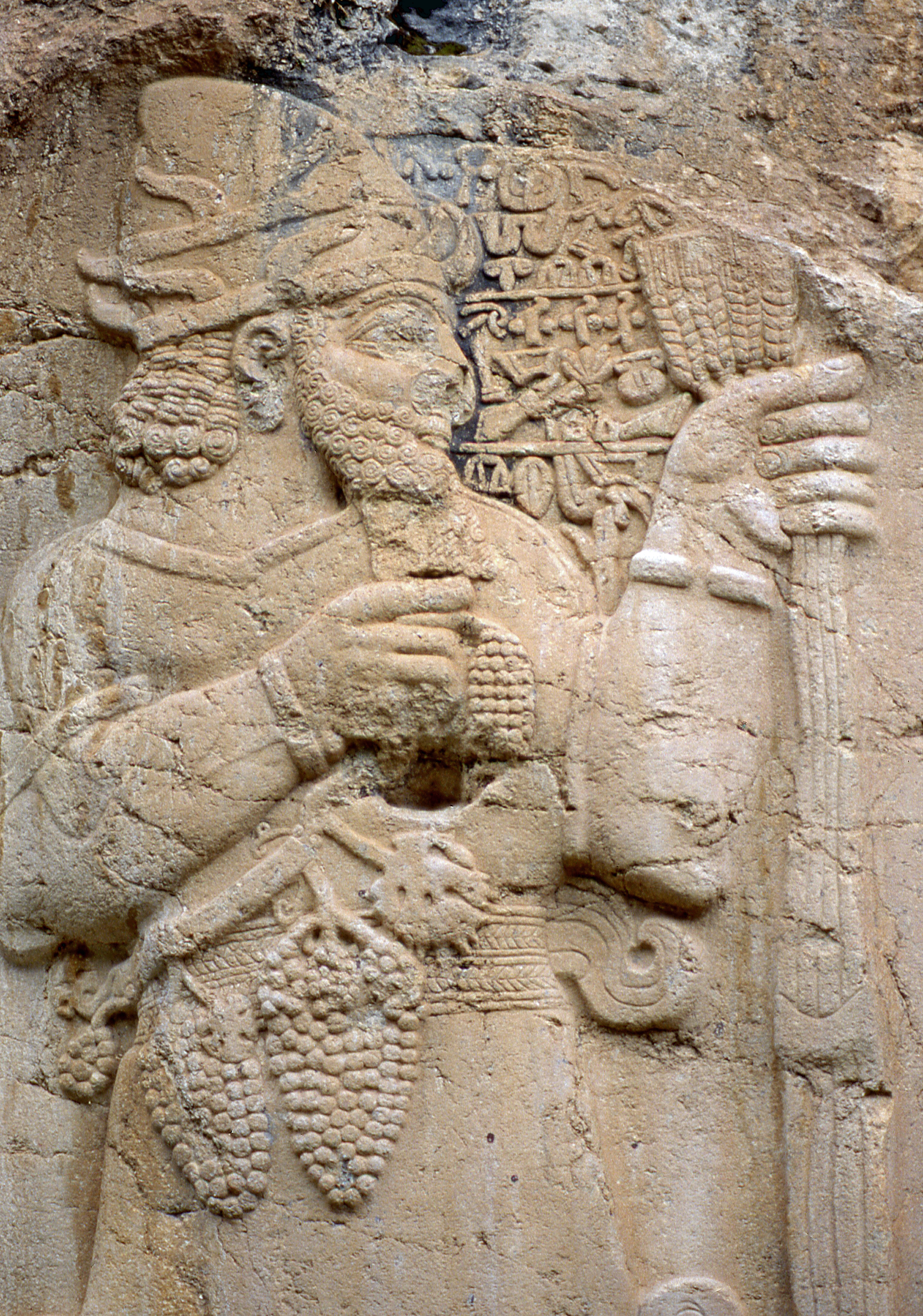
Detail of the relief

It is the best produced of the many Hittite rock reliefs and measures 4.2 m high by 2.4 m wide. It dates from the second half of the 8th century BC, the time of the Neo-Hittite-Aramean principalities. On the right hand side of the relief is king Warpalawas of Tuwana who stands on a stone platform with his hands raised in a gesture of greeting or worship. Opposite him at left stands the god Tarhunzas, who is depicted as much larger. Ripe stalks of wheat and grape clusters in his hands indicate that he brings about fertility. At his hip is the pommel of a weapon shaped like a bird's head, probably a vulture. The location of the relief on the cliff face of the İvriz Suyu suggests that the source of the fertility depicted on the relief was not the rare rains but the water which flowed from this spot almost all year. Thus, the spring could indicate the existence of a local spring cult. There are three inscriptions in Luwian hieroglyphs on the relief.

The first inscription is directly in front of the god's face.

"This is Warballawa's great Tarhunza. For him, one should long [word of unclear meaning] erect."

Another inscription is located behind the king's back.

"This is the self-portrait of Warballawa, the hero, as a relief."

And a third, located several meters below the relief. This one is heavily weathered due to being occasionally submerged.

“Carved by Tiyammaradu, Warballawa’s favorite (servant).”

== İvriz 2 ==
During construction work in 1986 on the weir about 75 meters upstream from İvriz 1, a fragment of a stele of Tarhunzas, with a bilingual inscription in Luwian hieroglyphs and Phoenician was discovered. The inscription states that it was erected by Warpalawas.

The Phoenician inscription was published by Wolfgang Röllig in 2013, and the Luwian inscriptions was published in 2025. Although the inscriptions are damaged, based on the readable elements they are assumed to be bilingual versions of the same message. The inscription indicates that the name of the İvriz spring during Warpalawas' time was Salusa, a name mentioned in earlier Hittite sources.

At the same time in 1986, a part of the head of a large statue, which probably also depicted Tarhunzas, was also discovered.

== Analysis ==
These finds gave support to the idea that the location was a wealthy sanctuary of Tarhunzas patronised by Warpalawas. South of the cliff relief in the hills along the Ambar Deresi river, near Kızlar Sarayı (the ruins of a Byzantine abbey), is another relief, which is a copy of the İvriz relief. It is not so well carved and was never completely finished; the hieroglyphs are missing.

== Modern history ==
The monument was described in Kâtip Çelebi (Hajji Khalifa)'s 17th-century geography. The Swedish-born French diplomat Jean Otter described the relief in his Voyage en Turquie... (1748), and was long said to be the first European to have seen it. But apparently he was depending on Kâtip Çelebi's text, and never saw it himself. The first European to actually visit it was a Major von Fischer in 1837.

== Bibliography ==
- Eberhard P. Rossner. Felsdenkmäler in der Türkei. Vol. 1: Die hethitischen Felsreliefs in der Türkei. Ein archäologischer Führer. 2nd revised edition. Rossner, München 1988, ISBN 3-924390-02-9, pp. 103–115.
- Dinçol, Belkis; 1994. "New archaeological and epigraphical finds from Ivriz. A preliminary report." Tel Aviv Journal of Archaeology 21: pp. 117–128. ISSN 0334-4355
- John David Hawkins. Corpus of Hieroglyphic Luwian Inscriptions. Vol. I: Inscriptions of the Iron Age. Part 2: Text. Amuq, Aleppo, Hama, Tabal, Assur Letters, Miscellaneous, Seals, Indices. Part 3: Plates. (= Studies in Indo-European Language and Culture 8). de Gruyter, Berlin. 2000, ISBN 3-11-010864-X.
- Horst Ehringhaus. Das Ende, das ein Anfang war - Felsreliefs und Felsinschriften der luwischen Staaten Kleinasiens vom 12. bis 8./7. Jahrhundert v. Chr. Nünnerich-Asmus, Mainz 2014, ISBN 978-3-943904-67-3, pp. 48–61.
