= Wadi Modaynah =

- Location within United Arab Emirates
- Coordinates: 25°2′38″N 56°0′40″E
- Country: United Arab Emirates
- Emirate: Ras Al Khaimah
- Elevation: 315 m (1,033 ft)

Wadi Modaynah is the name of a seasonal watercourse and dam to the south of Shawka in Ras Al Khaimah, United Arab Emirates (UAE).

== See also ==
- List of wadis of the United Arab Emirates
