= Danah Zohar =

American writer (born 1945)

- Born: 1945 (age 80–81)
- Education: MIT, Harvard
- Occupations: Author, speaker
- Website: danahzohar.com

Danah Zohar (born 1945 in Toledo, Ohio) is an American-British author and speaker on physics, philosophy, complexity and management.

== Life and work ==
Zohar studied Physics and Philosophy at MIT and did postgraduate work in Philosophy, Religion & Psychology at Harvard University. She is Visiting Professor at Tsinghua University School of Economics and Management, Beijing, the China Art Academy in Hanzhou, and an Entrepreneurial Mentor at Haier, China. She was included in the 2002 Financial Times Prentice Hall book Business Minds as one of "the world's 50 greatest management thinkers".

Zohar proposed spiritual intelligence as an aspect of intelligence that sits above the traditional measure of IQ and various notions of emotional intelligence, at the conscious level of meaning and purpose. Her 12 Principles of Spiritual Intelligence are derived from the properties of complex adaptive systems, which she describes as living quantum systems. Zohar originated Quantum Management Theory and advocates the new paradigm arising from quantum physics and the properties of nonlinear complex adaptive systems as a guiding model for personal psychology, corporate, and social systems as a 21st century replacement for the deterministic mechanics and machine metaphor found in the scientific management of Frederick Winslow Taylor and other early management thinkers.

== Selected publications ==
Zohar is the author (or co-author with her late husband, the psychiatrist Ian Marshall) of the following books:

- Zohar, Danah (1990). The Quantum Self: Human Nature and Consciousness Defined by the New Physics. New York: William Morrow and Company, Inc. ISBN 9780688087807. ISBN 0-688-08780-9
- Zohar, Danah; Marshall, Ian (1995). The Quantum Society: Mind, Physics, and a New Social Vision. New York: Bloomsbury Publishing. ISBN 0-688-10603-X
- Zohar, Danah (1997). ReWiring the Corporate Brain: Using the New Science to Rethink How We Structure and Lead Organizations. San Francisco: Berrett-Koehler Publishers, Inc. ISBN 9971-5-1214-9
- Zohar, Danah; Marshall, Ian (1997). Who's Afraid of Schrödinger's Cat? An A-to-Z Guide to All the New Science Ideas You Need to Keep Up with the New Thinking. New York: William Morrow and Company, Inc. ISBN 0-688-16107-3
- Zohar, Danah; Marshall, Ian (2001). SQ: Connecting With Our Spiritual Intelligence. New York: Bloomsbury Publishing. ISBN 0-7475-4676-2
- Zohar, Danah (2016). The Quantum Leader: A revolution in business thinking and practice. New York: Promethens Books. ISBN 9-78163-388241-6
- Zohar, Danah (2021). Zero Distance: Management in the Quantum Age. Palgrave Macmillan.ISBN 978-9811678516

== Recognition ==
- 2022: Inducted into Thinkers50 Hall of Fame
