= Tyana =

Ancient city in Turkey

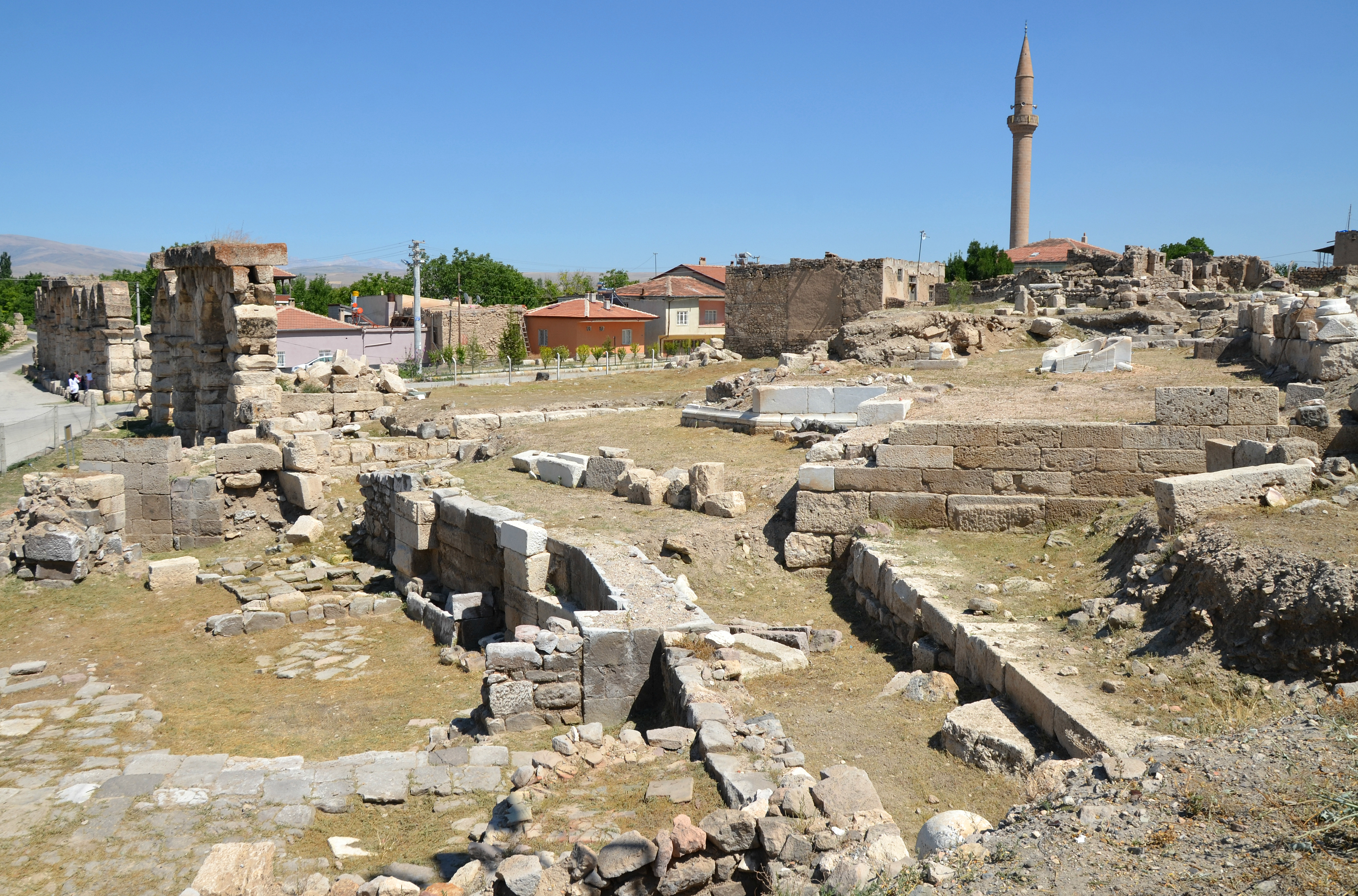
- Tyana, Cappadocia, Turkey

- Location within Turkey
- 37°50′53″N 34°36′40″E
- Type: Settlement
- Location: Kemerhisar, Niğde Province, Turkey
- Region: Cappadocia

Site notes
- Condition: In ruins

Tyana, earlier known as Tuwana during the Iron Age, and Tūwanuwa during the Bronze Age, was an ancient city in the Anatolian region of Cappadocia, in modern Kemerhisar, Niğde Province, Central Anatolia, Turkey.

It was the capital of a Luwian-speaking Neo-Hittite kingdom in the 1st millennium BC.

== Name ==
The name of the city was Tūwanuwa (𒌷𒌅𒌋𒉿𒉡𒉿) during the Hittite Empire, and Tuwana (𔑢𔗬𔐤𔔂) in the Luwian language during the Neo-Hittite period. From the Luwian name Tuwana were derived:

- the Neo-Assyrian Akkadian name of the city, Tuḫana (𒆳𒌅𒄩𒈾, 𒌷𒌅𒄩𒈾, 𒆳𒌓𒄩𒈾),
- the Phoenician name of the city, twn (𐤕𐤅𐤍),
- and the Ancient Greek name of the city, Tuana (Ancient Greek: Τύανα; Latin: Tyana).

== Geography ==
=== Location ===
The location of the Hittite Tūwanuwa/Neo-Hittite Tuwana/Classical Tyana corresponds to the modern-day town of Kemerhisar in Niğde Province, Turkey.

=== Surroundings ===
The region around Tyana, which corresponded to roughly the same area as the former Iron Age kingdom of Tuwana, was known in Classical Antiquity as Tyanitis. This region was surrounded to the south and southwest by the Taurus Mountains.

== History ==
According to later Hittite sources, Tūwanuwa was an important cult centre, and its local pantheon was headed by the Storm-god Tarḫunzas of Tūwanuwa and his consort, the goddess Šaḫḫaššara of Tūwanuwa.

=== Bronze Age ===
The Hittite Empire, with Tūwanuwa located in the Lower Land.

The city of Tūwanuwa was first mentioned in the texts of the Hittite Empire, as a city located in southeastern Anatolia, in the northern regions of the Lower Land. According to the Telipinu Proclamation, Tūwanuwa was part of the territories that the 17th century BC founder-king of the Hittite Old Empire, Labarna I, had conquered and which his sons divided among each other and established their rule there.

During the reign of the Hittite Middle Empire's king Tudhaliya III, the cities of Tūwanuwa and Uda had become border towns of the forces of Arzawa after it had invaded the Lower Land. Tūwanuwa itself was attacked by Arzawa, and Hittite records of this development associated Tūwanuwa with the town of Tupazziya and Mount Ammuna. Hittite descriptions of the city suggest that Tūwanuwa itself might have been located on a hill or a mountain at this time.

The prince Suppiluliuma fought a battle against the Arzawan forces near Tūwanuwa and recaptured Tūwanuwa, which then became a base from which the Hittite forces reconquered the Lower Land from Arzawa.

Several Hittite texts associated Tūwanuwa with the cities of Nenašša and Ḫupišna, attesting that they were located close to each other. The city of Purušḫattum was also located close to Tūwanuwa.

𔑢𔗬𔐤𔔂 (Hieroglyphic Luwian) (Tuwana)
- c. 12th century BC ?–c. 7th century BC ?
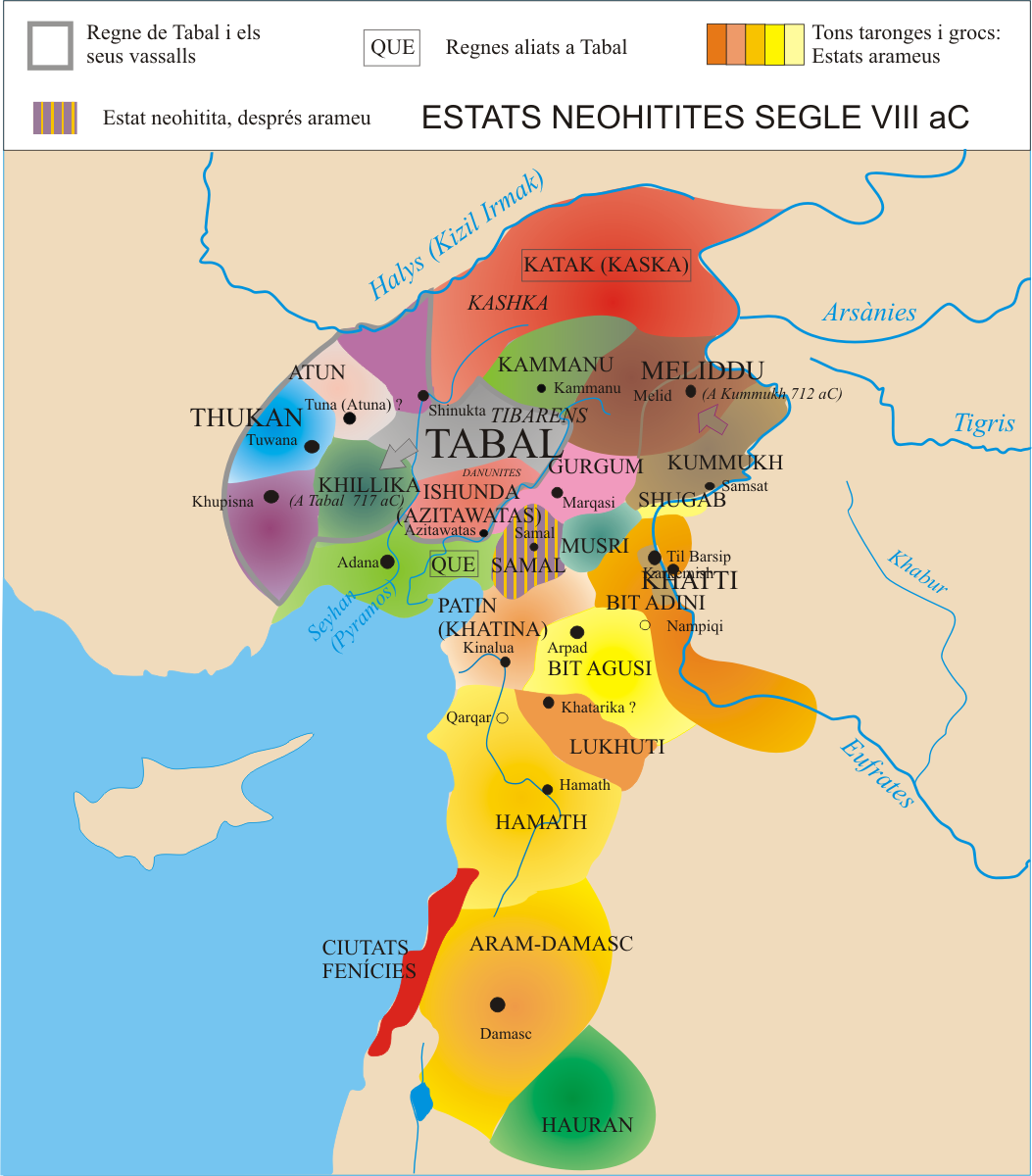
- Tuwana (in blue) among the Neo-Hittite states.

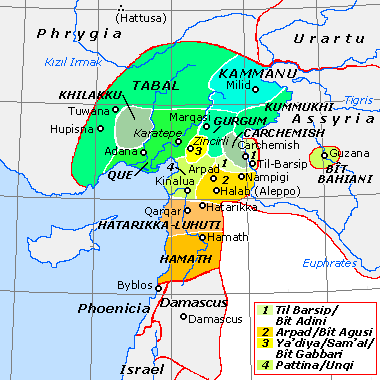
- Tabal among the Neo-Hittite states. Tuwana was one of the constituent states of Tabal.
- Capital: Tuwana
- Common languages: Luwian; Phrygian
- Religion: Luwian religion
- King
  - c. early 8th c. BC: Warpalawas I
  - c. 750 BC: Sarruwannis
  - ? – c. 740 BC: Muwaḫḫaranis I
  - c. 740–705 BC: Warpalawas II
  - c. late 8th c. BC: Muwaḫḫaranis II

Vassal of Tabal (mid 8th century BC) Vassal of the Neo-Assyrian Empire (c. 740s - 705 BC)
- Historical era: Iron Age
  - Late Bronze Age collapse: c. 12th century BC ?
  - Disestablished: c. 7th century BC ?
Preceded by
Hittite empire
- Today part of: Turkey

=== Iron Age ===
==== Neo-Hittite Kingdom of Tuwana ====
After the collapse of the Hittite Empire, Tūwanuwa became the centre of the Luwian-speaking Neo-Hittite state of Tuwana in the region of Tabal, in whose southernmost regions it was located.

===== Location =====
The kingdom of Tuwana was located in southern Cappadocia and covered the territory located in the present-day province of Niğde in Turkey, lying to the east of the Konya Plain and the Obruk Plateau across Lake Tuz and the Melendiz Mountains until the Hasandağ volcano to the north, where the Erdaş and Hodul mountains formed its northern boundary by separating it from the kingdom of Tabal, while to the south it extended to the south until the Cilician Gates so that Tuwana was the first area travellers would reach after leaving Ḫiyawa to the north by passing through the Cilician Gates to cross the Taurus Mountains, and a stele bearing Hieroglyphic Luwian and Phoenician inscriptions from İvriz testifies that Tuwana entertained close connections with Ḫiyawa to its south.

Tuwana thus corresponded to the region which later in Classical Antiquity was called Tyanitis.

Tuwana was therefore located in the southern Tabalian region, of which it was the largest and most prominent kingdom, with its territory consisting of several settlements surrounding the royal capital at the city of Tuwana, although the city of Naḫitiya (modern Niğde; possibly Hittite period Naḫita) might have temporarily acted as capital under the reign of the king Sarruwannis. Another important settlement in Tuwana was the location known in Classical Antiquity as Tynna and presently as Porsuk-Zeyve Höyük.

By the 8th century BC, Tuwana's territory included the Mount Mudi, which was likely identical with the "alabaster mountain," Mount Mulî, which the Neo-Assyrian king Shalmaneser III climbed and from where he extracted alabaster during his campaign in the Tabalian region in 837 BC. The name Mulî (𒆳𒈬𒇷𒄿) was the Akkadian form of a Luwian original name Mudi (𔑿𔑣) which had experienced the Luwian sound shift from /d/ to /l/.

Based on the close association of the "silver mountain," Mount Tunni, with Mount Mulî in the Neo-Assyrian records, both of these mountains were located close to each other, in the northeastern end of the Bolkar and Taurus Mountains, where are presently located the silver mines of Bulgarmaden and the gypsum mine at Porsuk-Zeyve Höyük. An inscription from the silver mines in the Bolkar Mountains suggests that these metallic resources constituted an important source of income for Tuwana.

===== History =====
Tuwana might have been ruled by a single dynasty consisting of the kings Warpalawas I, followed by his son Sarruwannis, who was succeeded by his own son Muwaḫḫaranis I, himself succeeded by his son Warpalawas II, whose son and successor was Muwaḫḫaranis II.

Tuwana was spared by the Neo-Assyrian king Shalmaneser III's invasion of the Tabalian region which he conducted in 837 BC.

====== Submission to the Neo-Assyrian Empire ======
By c. 738 BC, the Tabalian region, including Tuwana, had become a tributary of the Neo-Assyrian Empire, either after the Neo-Assyrian king Tiglath-pileser III's (r. 745 – 727 BC) conquest of Arpad over the course of 743 to 740 BC caused the states of the Tabalian region to submit to him, or possibly as a result of a campaign of Tiglath-pileser III in Tabal.

Consequently, the longest reigning king of Tuwana, Warpalawas II, was mentioned in the records of the Neo-Assyrian Empire as one of five kings who offered tribute to Tiglath-Pileser III in 738 and 737 BC.

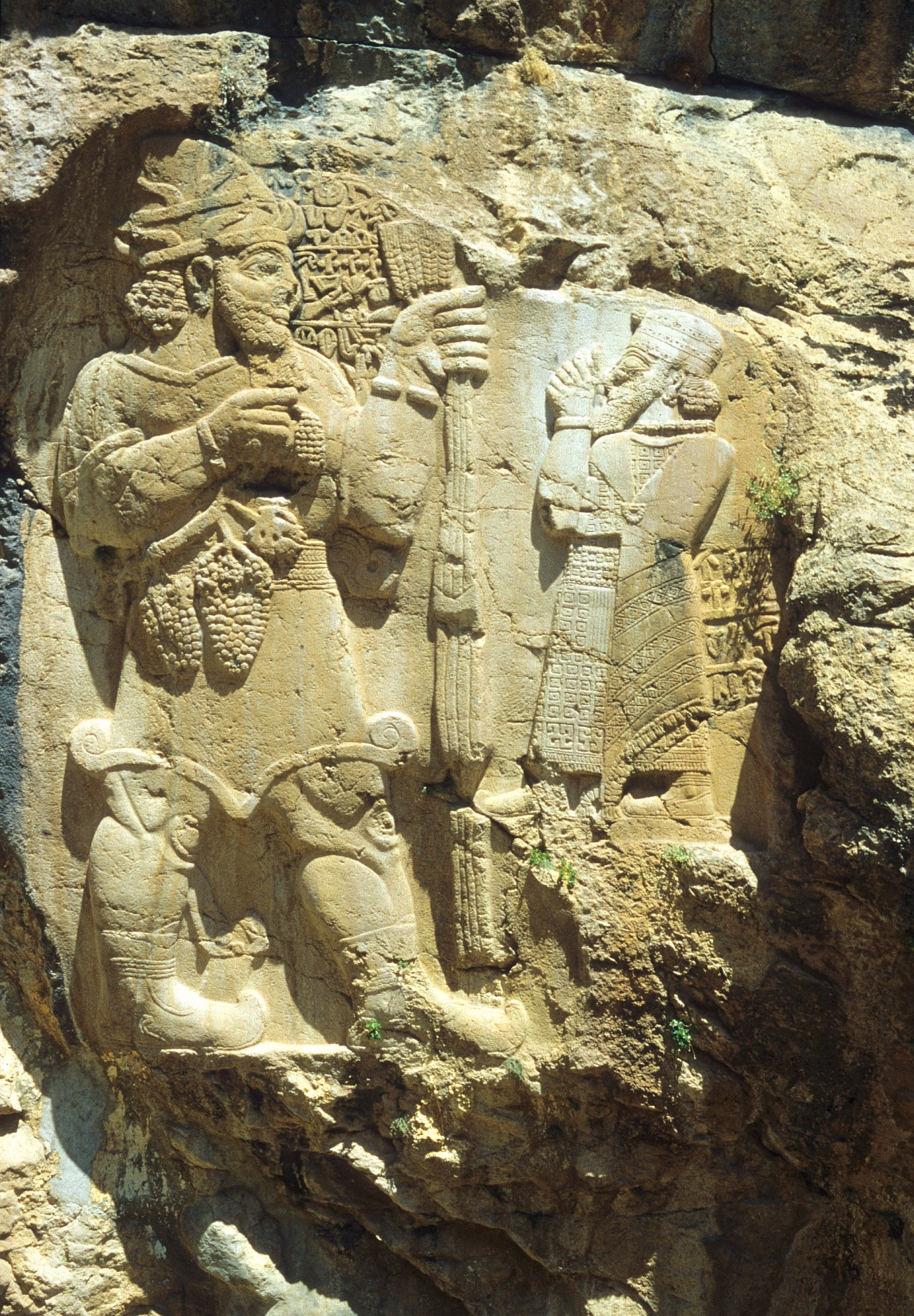
İvriz relief, depicting Warpalawas II (smaller, on the right) worshipping the Storm-god Tarḫunzas (taller, on the left)

Tuwana was a powerful state under Warpalawas II, under whose reign it contained one sub-kingdom whose capital was at the site corresponding to present-day Porsuk, and whose ruler Tarḫunazzas declared himself to be the "servant" of Warpalawas. Furthermore, the king Wasusarmas of Tabal listed Warpalawas as one of his allies.

By the time of the Neo-Assyrian king Sargon II (r. 722 – 705 BC), Tuwana was one of the last still independent Tabalian kingdoms, although it was coming under the pressure of both the Neo-Assyrian Empire and the kingdom of Phrygia because of its location between these two powers. Some Old Phrygian inscriptions on basalt, possibly dated from Warpalawas II's reign, as well as the Phrygian robe depicted as worn by Warpalawas II in his İvriz monument, suggest that aspects of Phrygian culture were arriving into Tuwana during the late 8th century BC in the time of Warpalawas II, and three tumulus graves with Phrygian metal objects have been discovered at Kaynarca. The ruling dynasty of Tuwana consequently exhibited a unique mix of Luwian, Neo-Assyrian and Phrygian elements in their style and iconography.

Warpalawas II nevertheless appears to have carried out a policy of cooperation with the Neo-Assyrian Empire, thanks to which he was able to keep his throne until the c. 700s BC.

And, after Sargon II had annexed the kingdom of Tabal, then reorganised as the kingdom of Bīt-Burutaš, and deported its king Ambaris in 713 BC, he increased Tuwana's territory in the broader Tabalian region by giving Warpalawas II part of the territory of Bīt-Burutaš.

====== Imposition of Neo-Assyrian governorship ======
Tuwana however appears to have come under direct Assyrian rule during the later years of Warpalawas II's reign, especially following the annexation of the kingdom of Tabal, then reorganised as the kingdom of Bīt-Burutaš, and the deportation of its king Ambaris in 713 BC, after which Sargon II appointed one Aššur-šarru-uṣur as governor of Que based in Ḫiyawa who also held authority on Ḫilakku and the Tabalian region, including both Bīt-Burutaš and Tuwana.

Thus Tuwana and other nearby Anatolian kingdoms were placed the authority of Aššur-šarru-uṣur. Following the appointment of Aššur-šarru-uṣur, Warpalawas II of Tuwana and Awarikus of Ḫiyawa became largely symbolic rulers although they might have still held the power to manage their kingdoms locally.

The reason for these changes was due to the fact that, although Warpalawas II and Awarikus had been loyal Neo-Assyrian vassals, Sargon II considered them as being too elderly to be able to efficiently uphold Neo-Assyrian authority in southeastern Anatolia, where the situation had become volatile because of encroachment by the then growing power of Phrygian kingdom. Tuwana nevertheless appears to have continued to thrive as a Neo-Assyrian vassal during the rules of Warpalawas II and his son and successor, Muwaḫḫaranis II.

Some cities in these new territories from Bīt-Burutaš which Sargon II had assigned to Warpalawas II were later attacked and occupied by Atuna and Ištuanda in c. 710 BC.

The last known king of Tuwana was Muwaḫḫaranis II, the son of Warpalawas II. As in the latter part of his father's reign, Tuwana during the rule of Muwaḫḫaranis II was under direct rule of the Neo-Assyrian governor Aššur-šarru-uṣur.

====== Regained independence ======
Muwaḫḫaranis II might have continued to rule in Tabal into the 7th century BC, by which time Neo-Assyrian control of the Tabalian region had ended.

A late 8th century BC king named Masauraḫissas is also attested from an inscription at Porsuk-Zeyve Höyük, although it is uncertain whether he was the king of another state (he is commonly assumed to have been a ruler of Tunna), or whether he ruled in Tuwana after Muwaḫḫaranis II. Masauraḫissas's name might possibly have been a Luwianisation of a Phrygian name Masa Urgitos.

By c. 675 BC, Neo-Assyrian sources no longer referred to the local Tabalian kings, suggesting that they, including Tuwana, might have been annexed by the king Iškallû of Tabal proper, after which it possibly became part of the united kingdom of Tabal and Melid of the king Mugallu.

The situation of Tuwana following the loss of Neo-Assyrian control over the Tabalian region after 705 BC is unknown, and it might have been annexed by a neighbouring state, such as Ḫilakku, Ḫiyawa, or Mugallu's united kingdom of Tabal and Melid. Nevertheless, survival of the city's name until the Classical period suggests that there was no significant cultural break there after the end of the 8th century BC.

===== Society =====
Tuwana was a region of intensive economic and cultural exchange and a political centre.

====== Population ======
Tuwana was a state whose population was descended from the largely Luwian inhabitants of the former Hittite region of Tūwanuwa.

====== Religion ======
The god Tarḫunzas was the most popular iconographic motif on the stelae and rock motifs of Tuwana. He was always depicted carrying a bundle of ears of grain and a vine which grew out of his shows and represented his vegetative role.

===== List of rulers =====
- Warpalawas I ?, r. c. early 8th century BC
- Sarruwannis (Hieroglyphic Luwian: 𔗔𔗑𔗬𔗐𔗔), r. first half of 8th century BC
- Muwaḫḫaranis I (Hieroglyphic Luwian: 𔑾𔗬𔓷𔖱𔗐𔗔), r. ? – c. 740 BC
- Warpalawas II (Hieroglyphic Luwian: 𔗬𔖱𔕸𔓊𔗬𔗔 Neo-Assyrian Akkadian: 𒁹𒌨𒁄𒆷𒀀, romanized: ᵐUrpallâ), r. c. 740 BC – 705 BC
- Muwaḫḫaranis II (Hieroglyphic Luwian: 𔑾𔗬𔓷𔖱𔗐𔗔), r. c. late 8th century BC – unknown
- Masauraḫissas ? (Hieroglyphic Luwian: 𔒅𔗔𔖙𔖱𔗒𔑷𔗦)

=== Achaemenid period ===
Tyana remained an important city in the Achaemenid period, when it was mentioned by Xenophon in the Anabasis. Tyana served as a Persian administrative center and may have been the seat of a satrap.

=== Hellenistic period ===
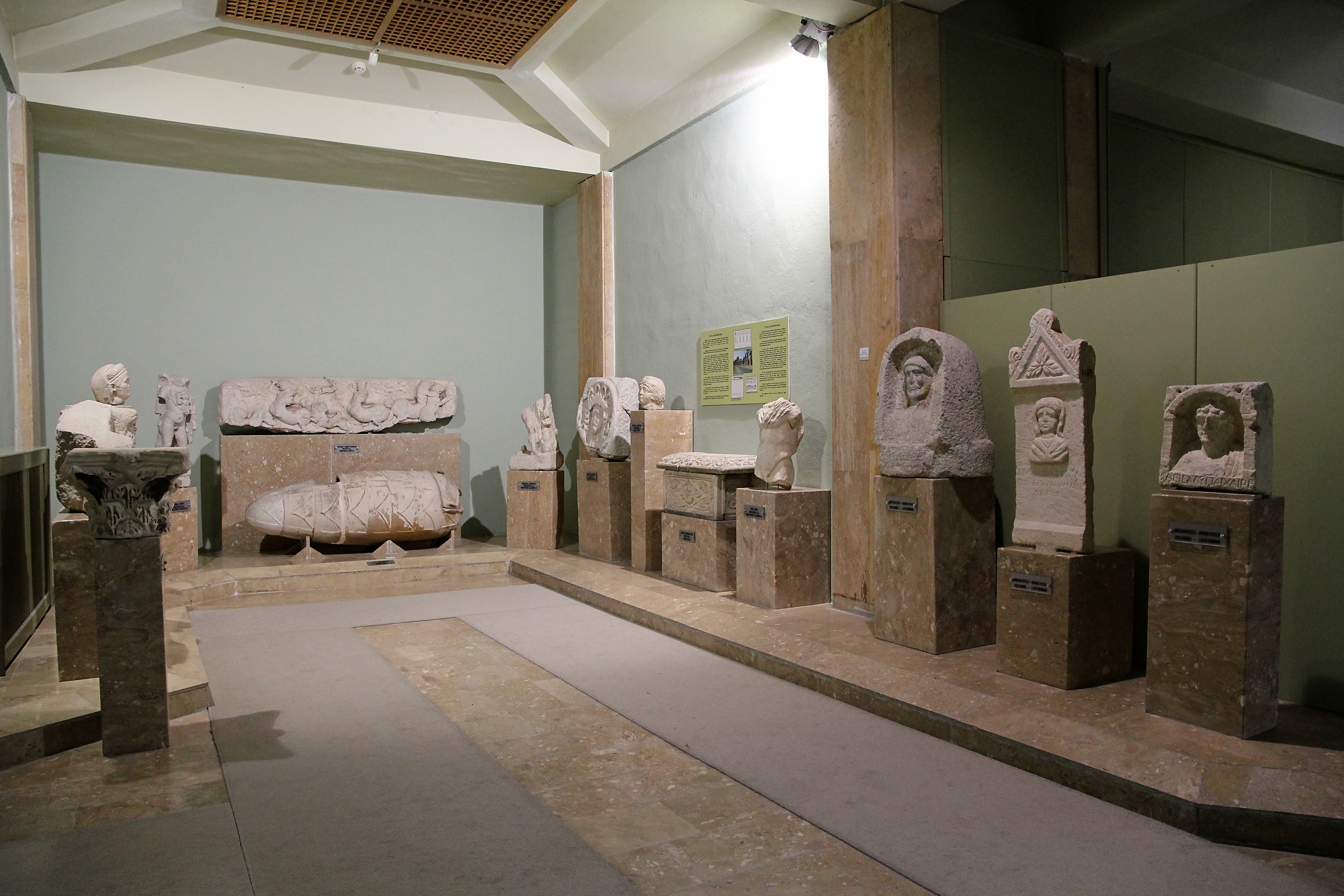
Artifacts from Tyana in Niğde Archaeological Museum

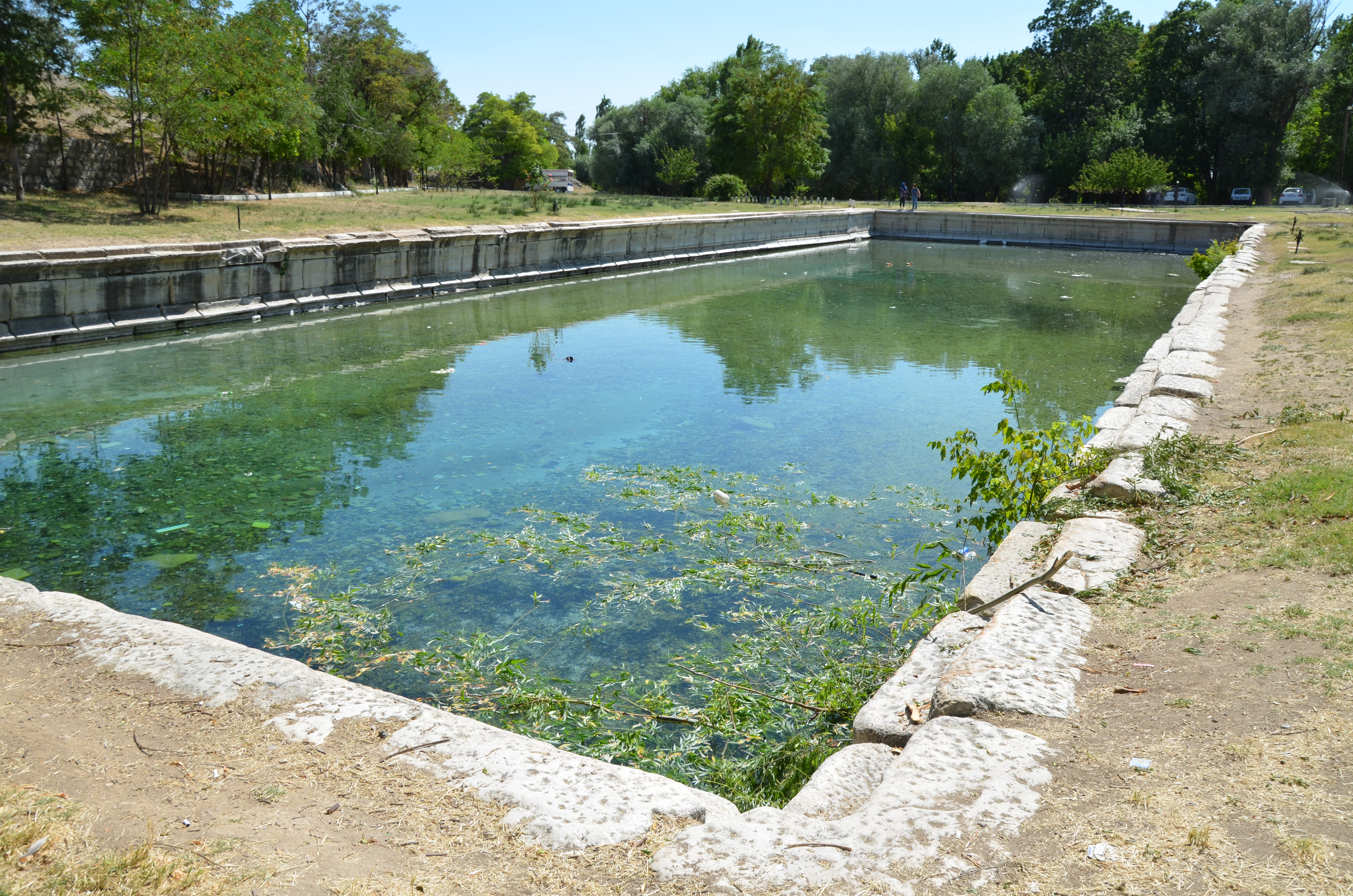
Tyana archeological site

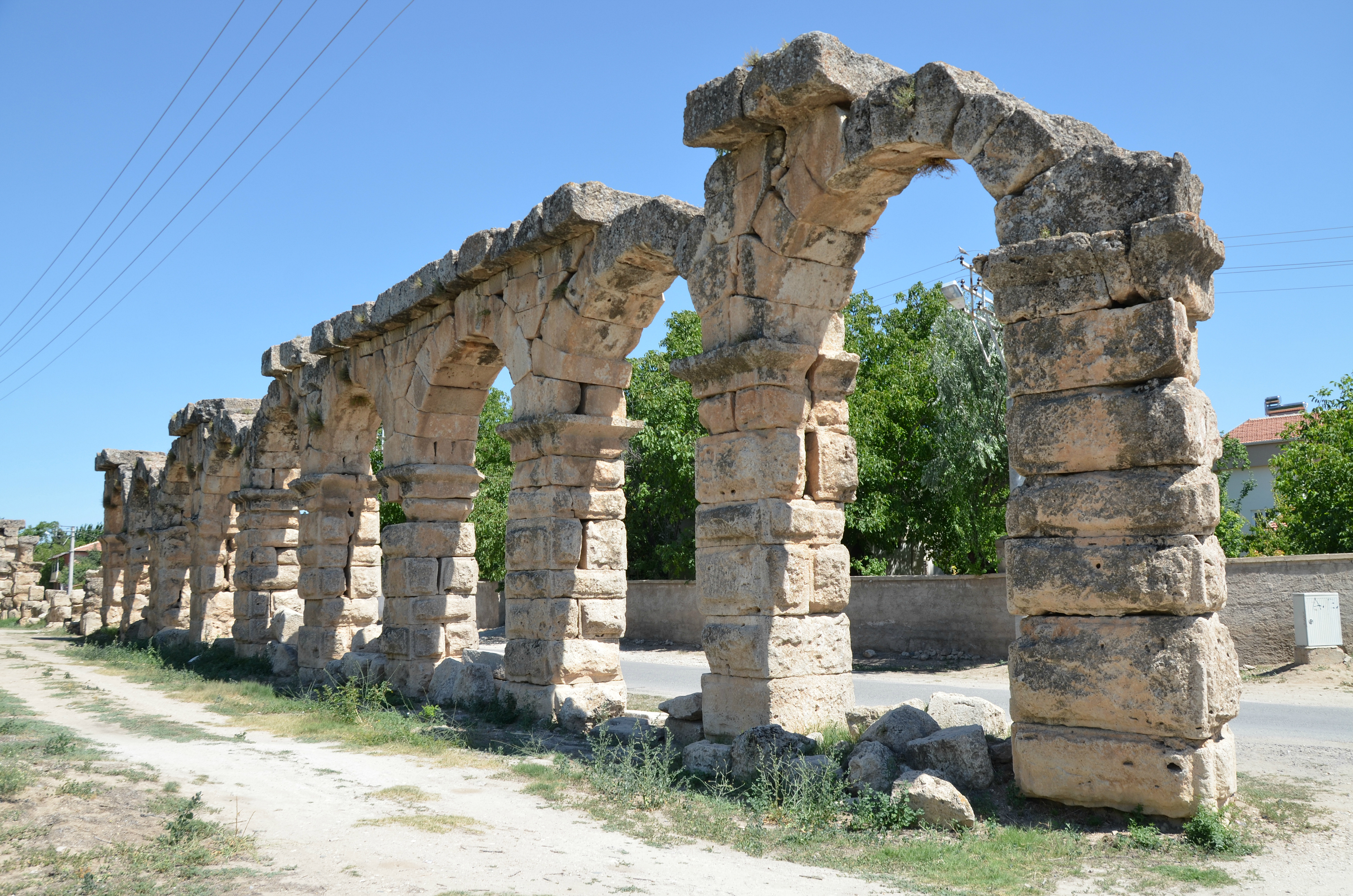
Roman Aqueduct of Tyana

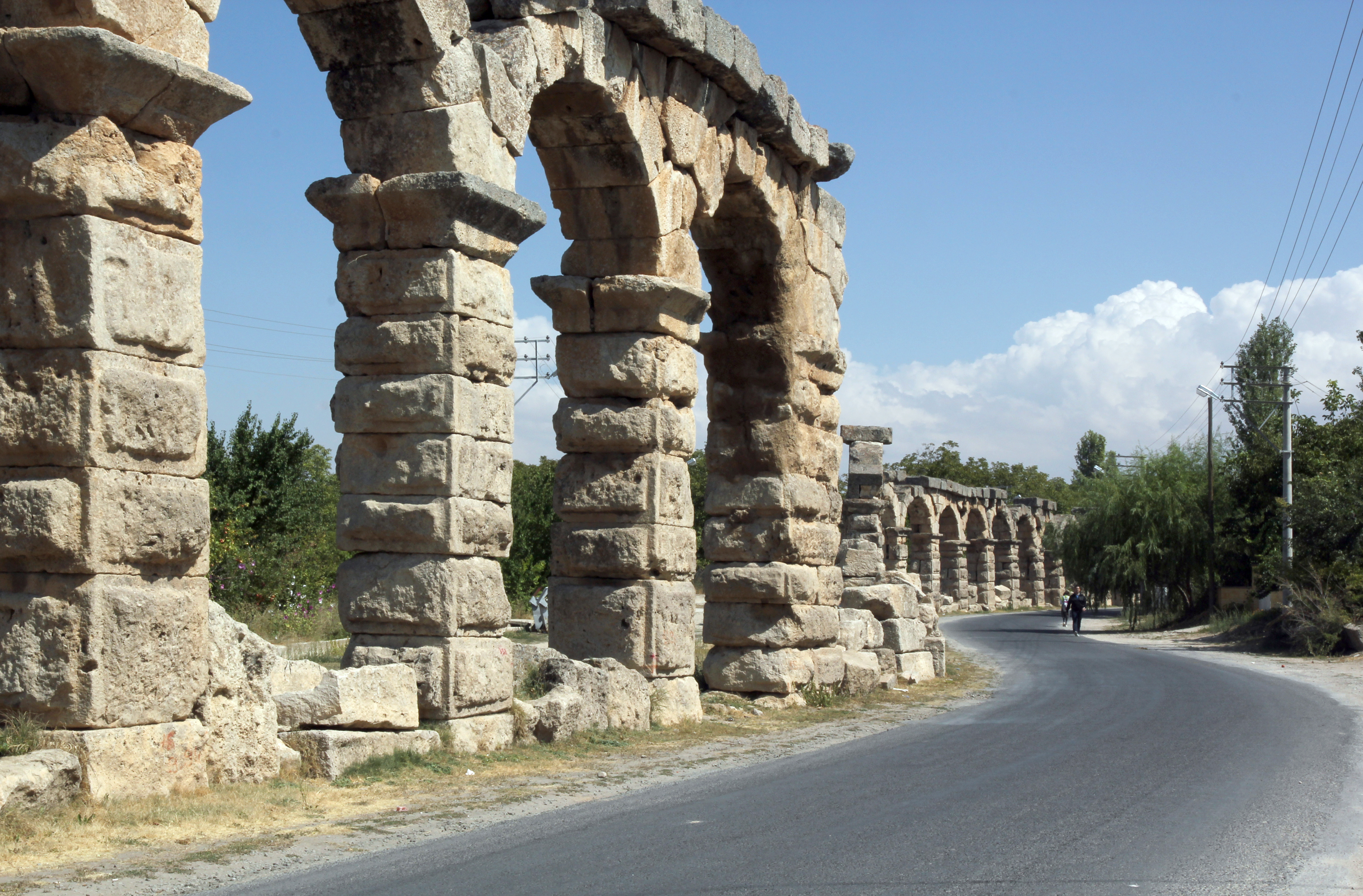
Roman Aqueduct of Tyana

By the Graeco-Roman period, the city became known as Tyana (Ancient Greek: Τύανα, romanized: Túana; Latin: Tyana), and the country around it as Tyanitis (Ancient Greek: Τυανῖτις, romanized: Tuanîtis; Latin: Tyanitis).

In Greek legend, the city was first called Thoana because Thoas, a Thracian king, was its founder (Arrian, Periplus Ponti Euxini, vi); it was in Cappadocia, at the foot of the Taurus Mountains and near the Cilician Gates (Strabo, XII, 537; XIII, 587). According to Strabo the city was renamed as "Eusebeia at the Taurus", likely due to its refoundation by Ariarathes V Eusebes. In the first century B.C., the city had a gymnasium.

During the Hellenistic period, Tyana was renamed as Eusebeia near the Taurus (Εὐσέβεια ἡ πρὸς τῷ Ταύρῳ), and was the second most important city in Cappadocia after Mazaca.

=== Roman period ===
In the first century of Roman rule of Cappadocia, the city was one of the only four major "cities" in the region and among those the most hellenised and therefore the closest to a Roman city. Tyana is the reputed birthplace of the celebrated philosopher (and reputed saint or magician) Apollonius of Tyana in the first century AD. Ovid (Metamorphoses VIII) places the tale of Baucis and Philemon in the vicinity.

Under Roman Emperor Caracalla, the city became Antoniana colonia Tyana. After having sided first with the Sassanid ruler Shapur in 260 and then Queen Zenobia of Palmyra, it was captured by emperor Aurelian in 272, who would not allow his soldiers to sack it, allegedly because Apollonius appeared to him. It is more likely though that the city was its strategic importance in a fertile plain and as a major stop linking Anatolia with Cilicia.

In 372, Emperor Valens split the province of Cappadocia in two, and Tyana became the capital and metropolis of Cappadocia Secunda, and the city was sometimes referred to as Christoupolis (Medieval Greek: Χριστούπολις, lit. 'city of Christ') in Late Antiquity.

Due to its location, the city was on one of the major Christian pilgrim routes in the empire and also had its own local saints such as Orestes, who according to tradition was martyred in Late Antiquity in Tyana and remained a venerated figure in Cappadocia up to the tenth century at least.

=== Byzantine period ===
Map of the Arab-Byzantine frontier region, with Tyana in the lower left corner

In the fifth century, Cooper and Decker estimate that the city had possibly a population of no more than 10,000. Being located around 30 km to the north of the Cilician Gates, Tyana lied on the main road between Constantinople and the Levant. Following the Muslim conquests and the establishment of the frontier between the Byzantine Empire and the Caliphate along the Taurus Mountains, this made Tyana a recurrent target of raids by the Umayyad and then Abbasid Caliphates in 708, 806 and 831:

- the city was first sacked by the Umayyads after a long siege in 708, and remained deserted for some time before being rebuilt
- it was then occupied by the Abbasid caliph Harun al-Rashid in 806. Harun began converting the city into a military base and even erected a mosque there, but evacuated it after the Byzantine emperor Nikephoros I bought a peace.

The city was again taken and razed by the Abbasids under Al-Abbas ibn al-Ma'mun in 831. Abbas rebuilt the site three years later as an Abbasid military colony in preparation for Caliph al-Ma'mun's planned conquest of Byzantium, but after Ma'mun's sudden death in August 833 the campaign was abandoned by his successor al-Mu'tasim and the half-rebuilt city was razed again.

Tyana finally entered into a permanent phase of decline after 933 and lost its importance to Nakida.

In the Middle and Late Byzantine periods the city recovered somewhat as a place of relative agricultural and commercial importance, but it never hosted more than a few thousand inhabitants.

=== Modern period ===
Insignificant ruins of the Byzantine city are still visible at the site of Tyana in the present.

== Ecclesiastical history ==
Beginning in 325, Tyana became the seat of a bishopric and then of a metropolitan, and would remain so until the 14th century.

As noted, in 372 Emperor Valens created the province of Cappadocia Secunda, of which Tyana became the metropolis. This aroused a violent controversy between Anthimus, Bishop of Tyana, and St. Basil of Caesarea, each of whom wished to have as many suffragan sees as possible. About 640 Tyana had three, and it was the same in the tenth century (Heinrich Gelzer, "Ungedruckte ... Texte der Notitiae episcopatum", 538, 554).

Le Quien mentions 28 bishops of Tyana, among whom were:

- Eutychius, at Nice in 325
- Anthimus, the rival of St. Basil
- Aetherius, at Constantinople in 381
- Theodore, the friend of St. John Chrysostom
- Eutherios, the partisan of Nestorius, deposed and exiled in 431
- Cyriacus, a Severian Monophysite.

In May 1359, Tyana still had a metropolitan (Mikelosich and Müller, "Acta patriarchatus Constantinopolitani", I, 505). In 1365 the metropolitan of Caesarea secured its administration, following its decline by the Anatolian Beyliks. The metropolitanate received a new metropolitan in 1369.

During the Ottoman period, the metropolitan of Iconium received the former metropolis of Tyana, whence his full title was "Metropolitan of Iconium and Tyana, hypertimos and exarch of all Lycaonia and Second Cappadocia".

In 2020, during excavations the archaeologists discovered an octagonal church and coins dated to the 4th century.

== Sources ==
- Adiego, Ignasi-Xavier (2019). "The Survival of the God Name Šarruma in Cilician Names in the Greek Sources". Altorientalische Forschungen [Ancient Near Eastern Research]. 46 (2). Walter de Gruyter: 147–160. doi:10.1515/aofo-2019-0010.
- Aro, Sanna (2013). "Tabal". In Streck, Michael P. [in German]; Frantz-Szabó, Gabriella; Krebernik, Manfred [in German]; Bonacossi, D. Morandi; Postgate, J. N.; Seidl, Ursula [in German]; Stol, M.; Wilhelm, Gernot [in German] (eds.). Reallexikon der Assyriologie und Vorderasiatischen Archäologie [Encyclopaedia of Ancient Near Eastern Studies] (in German). Vol. 13. Berlin, Germany; New York City, United States: Walter de Gruyter. pp. 388–391. ISBN 978-3-110-30715-3.
- Aro, Sanna (2017). "2.6.11. Tuwana and Karatepe". In Dillon, John Noel (ed.). Brill's New Pauly Supplements II Online. Vol. 9. Brill. ISBN 978-9-004-39117.
- Aro, Sanna (2023). "Vanishing kingdoms: Tabal and Tuwana during the seventh century BC". In Draycott, Catherine M.; Branting, Scott; Lehner, Joseph W.; Özarslan, Yasemin (eds.). From Midas to Cyrus and Other Stories: Papers on Iron Age Anatolia in Honour of Geoffrey and Françoise Summers. BIAA Monograph Series. London, United Kingdom: British Institute at Ankara. pp. 113–135. ISBN 978-1-912-09011-2.
- Dietrich Berges, "Die Frühgeschichte Tyanas." In Dietrich Berges, Johannes Nollé, Tyana. Archäologisch-historische Untersuchungen zum südwestlichen Kappadokien. Rudolf Habelt Verlag, Bonn 2000, ISBN 3-7749-2959-9, pp. 465–475.
- Bryce, Trevor (2009). The Routledge Handbook of the Peoples and Places of Ancient Western Asia: From the Early Bronze Age to the Fall of the Persian Empire. London, United Kingdom: Routledge. ISBN 978-0-415-39485-7.
- Bryce, Trevor (2012). The World of The Neo-Hittite Kingdoms: A Political and Military History. Oxford, United Kingdom: Oxford University Press. ISBN 978-0-199-21872-1.
- Cohen, Getzel M. (1996). The Hellenistic Settlements in Europe, the Islands, and Asia Minor. Hellenistic Culture and Society. Vol. 17. Berkeley, United States: University of California Press. ISBN 978-0-520-91408-7.
- Cooper, Eric; Decker, Michael J. (24 July 2012). Life and Society in Byzantine Cappadocia. Springer. ISBN 978-1-137-02964-5.
- D'Alfonso, Lorenzo (2012). "Tabal, an 'out-group' definition in the first Millennium BCE". In Lanfranchi, Giovanni B.; Bonacossi, Daniele Morandi; Pappi, Cinzia; Ponchia, Simonetta [in German] (eds.). Leggo! Studies Presented to Frederick Mario Fales on the Occasion of His 65ᵗʰ Birthday. Wiesbaden, Germany: Harrassowitz Verlag. pp. 173–194. ISBN 978-3-447-06659-4.
- Fiaccadori, Gianfranco (1991). "Tyana". In Kazhdan, Alexander; Talbot, Alice-Mary; Cutler, Anthony; Gregory, Timothy E.; Ševčenko, Nancy P. (eds.). The Oxford Dictionary of Byzantium. Vol. 3. New York City, United States; Oxford, United Kingdom: Oxford University Press. p. 2130. ISBN 978-0-195-04652-6.
- Hawkins, John D [in German] (2000a). Inscriptions of the Iron Age. Part 1: Text, Introduction, Karatepe, Karkamiš, Tell Ahmar, Maraş, Malatya, Commagene. Corpus of Hieroglyphic Luwian Inscriptions. Vol. 1. Berlin, Germany; New York City, United States: Walter de Gruyter. ISBN 978-3-110-10864-4.
- Hawkins, John David [in German] (2000b). Inscriptions of the Iron Age, Part 2: Text: Amuq, Aleppo, Hama, Tabal, Assur Letters, Miscellaneous, Seals, Indices. Corpus of Hieroglyphic Luwian Inscriptions. Vol. 1. Berlin, Germany; New York City, United States: Walter de Gruyter. ISBN 978-3-110-10864-4.
- Hawkins, John David [in German] (2000c). Inscriptions of the Iron Age, Part 3: Plates. Corpus of Hieroglyphic Luwian Inscriptions. Vol. 1. Berlin, Germany; New York City, United States: Walter de Gruyter. ISBN 978-3-110-10864-4.
- Hawkins, J. D. [in German] (1997). "Muli". In Edzard, Dietz Otto; Calmeyer, P.; Postgate, J. N.; Röllig, W. [in German]; von Soden, W.; Stol, M.; Wilhelm, G.; Frantz-Szabó, Gabriella (eds.). Reallexikon der Assyriologie und vorderasiatischen Archäologie [Encyclopaedia of Ancient Near Eastern Studies]. Vol. 8. Berlin, Germany; New York City, United States: Walter de Gruyter. p. 414. ISBN 978-3-110-14809-1.
- Hawkins, J. D. [in German] (2014). "Urballa". In Streck, Michael P. [in German]; Frantz-Szabó, Gabriella; Krebernik, Manfred [in German]; Bonacossi, D. Morandi; Postgate, J. N.; Seidl, Ursula [in German]; Stol, M.; Wilhelm, Gernot [in German] (eds.). Reallexikon der Assyriologie und Vorderasiatischen Archäologie [Encyclopaedia of Ancient Near Eastern Studies]. Vol. 14. Berlin, Germany; New York City, United States: Walter de Gruyter. p. 408. ISBN 978-3-110-41761-6.
- Kryszeń, A. (2023). "Tuwanuwa". Hittite Toponyms. University of Mainz; University of Würzburg.
- Mouton, J. D. (2014). "Tuwanuwa". In Streck, Michael P. [in German]; Frantz-Szabó, Gabriella; Krebernik, Manfred [in German]; Bonacossi, D. Morandi; Postgate, J. N.; Seidl, Ursula [in German]; Stol, M.; Wilhelm, Gernot [in German] (eds.). Reallexikon der Assyriologie und Vorderasiatischen Archäologie [Encyclopaedia of Ancient Near Eastern Studies] (in French). Vol. 14. Berlin, Germany; New York City, United States: Walter de Gruyter. pp. 248–249. ISBN 978-3-110-41761-6.
- Simon, Zsolt (2013). "Überlegungen zu Masaurhisas, einem König aus Tabal, und der Herrscherliste von Tuwana" [Reflections on Masaurhisas, a king from Tabal, and the king-list of Tuwana]. Anatolica. 39: 277–296. doi:10.2143/ANA.39.0.2990791.
- Simon, Zsolt (2021). "401 BC: The Year the Neo-Hittite Statehood Ended". In Payne, Annick; Velhartická, Šárka; Wintjes, Jorit [in German] (eds.). Beyond All Boundaries: Anatolia in the First Millennium BC. Orbis Biblicus et Orientalis. Vol. 295. Leuven, Belgium: Peeters Publishers. pp. 675–688. ISBN 978-9-042-94884-6.
- Singer, Itamar; Hoffner, Harry Angier (2002). Hittite Prayers. Writings from the Ancient World. Vol. 11. Atlanta, United States: Society of Biblical Literature. ISBN 978-9-004-12695-4.
- Starke, Frank [in German] (2006). "Asia Minor". In Cancik, Hubert [in German]; Schneider, Helmuth [in German]; Salazar, Christine F.; Möller, Astrid [in German]; Ruppel, Antonia; Warburton, David [in German] (eds.). Brill's New Pauly: Encyclopaedia of the Ancient World. Vol. 2. Leiden, Netherlands; Boston, United States: Brill. pp. 118–130. doi:10.1163/1574-9347_bnp_e614980. ISBN 90-04-12265-6.
- Streck, M.P. [in German] (2014). "Tunni". In Streck, Michael P. [in German]; Frantz-Szabó, Gabriella; Krebernik, Manfred [in German]; Bonacossi, D. Morandi; Postgate, J. N.; Seidl, Ursula [in German]; Stol, M.; Wilhelm, Gernot [in German] (eds.). Reallexikon der Assyriologie und Vorderasiatischen Archäologie [Encyclopaedia of Ancient Near Eastern Studies]. Vol. 14. Berlin, Germany; New York City, United States: Walter de Gruyter. pp. 189–190. ISBN 978-3-110-41761-6.
- Strobel, Karl [in German] (2010). "Tyana". In Cancik, Hubert [in German]; Schneider, Helmuth [in German]; Salazar, Christine F.; Bachmann, Cordula; Barkowski, Kim; Chronopoulos, Tina; van Eijndhoven, David; Imbausen, Annette; van der Mije, Sebastian R.; Op de Coul, Michiel; Ruppel, Antonia; Schroeder, Chad; Vermeulen, Corinna; Vetter, Barbara (eds.). Brill's New Pauly: Encyclopaedia of the Ancient World. Vol. 15. Leiden, Netherlands; Boston, United States: Brill. p. 52. ISBN 978-9-004-14220-7.
- Summers, Geoffrey D. (2023). "Resizing Phrygia: Migration, State and Kingdom". Altorientalische Forschungen [Ancient Near Eastern Research]. 50 (1). Walter de Gruyter: 107–128. doi:10.1515/aofo-2023-0009.
- Taracha, Piotr [in German] (2009). Religions of Second Millennium Anatolia. Dresdner Beiträge Zur Hethitologie. Vol. 27. Wiesbaden, Germany: Harrassowitz Verlag. ISBN 978-3-447-05885-8.
- Vryonis, Speros (1971). The Decline of Medieval Hellenism in Asia Minor and the Process of Islamization from the Eleventh through the Fifteenth Century. University of California Press. ISBN 0-520-01597-5.
- Weeden, Mark (2010). "Tuwati and Wasusarma: Imitating the Behaviour of Assyria". Iraq. 72. British Institute for the Study of Iraq: 39–61. doi:10.1017/S0021088900000589.
- Weeden, Mark (2017). "Tabal and the Limits of Assyrian Imperialism". In Heffron, Yağmur; Stone, Adam; Worthington, Martin (eds.). At the Dawn of History: Ancient Near Eastern Studies in Honour of J. N. Postgate. Vol. 2. Winona, United States: Eisenbrauns. pp. 721–736. ISBN 978-1-57506-471-0.
- Weeden, Mark (2023). "The Iron Age States of Central Anatolia and Northern Syria". In Radner, Karen; Moeller, Nadine; Potts, Daniel T. (eds.). The Age of Assyria. The Oxford History of the Ancient Near East. Vol. 4. New York City, United States: Oxford University Press. pp. 912–1026. ISBN 978-0-190-68763-2.

== Sources ==
- Treadgold, Warren (1988). The Byzantine Revival, 780–842. Stanford, California: Stanford University Press. ISBN 978-0-8047-1462-4.
- Treadgold, Warren (1997). A History of the Byzantine State and Society. Stanford, California: Stanford University Press. ISBN 0-8047-2630-2.
