= Dana (given name) =

- Pronunciation: UK: /ˈdɑːnə/ DAHN-ə; US: /ˈdeɪnə/ DAYN-ə
- Gender: Unisex

Origin
- Origin: Multiple
- Meaning: Pearl, wise, arbiter, God is my judge, generous, Dane, short for Bogdana, Yordana or Daniela
- Region of origin: Global

Other names
- Related names: Dena

Dana is a unisex given name. It was among the 100 most popular names given to girls born in the United States between 1960 and 1990. It has since fallen in popularity and was ranked the 446th most popular name given to girls born in the United States in 2007. As a male forename it was of the 314th rank out of 1,219 in the 1990 U.S. census.

== Derivations ==
The name has multiple derivations. Dana or Danah, in Arabic, means 'the most perfectly sized, valuable and beautiful pearl'. This name is used by Arab states of the Persian Gulf (Eastern Arabia), due to their traditional pearl diving professions wherein they gave different type of pearls names. In Persian, the word dānā literally means 'wise', and some speculate that the name is first used as a first name in Shahnameh. In Persian, it is both a masculine and a feminine given name.

It is also occasionally regarded as a feminine version of Daniel or a short version of feminine names such as Bogdana or Yordana. In Hebrew, the name Dana is the feminine form of Dan, and means 'arbiter'. In Romanian and Czech, it is a feminine name, derived from the name Daniela; the masculine form being Dan/Daniel. In Polish, it is a feminine name, derived from the name Danuta.

== People with the name ==
=== Female ===
==== Mononymous ====
- Dana (Irish singer) (born 1951), Irish singer and former politician, winner of the 1970 Eurovision Song Contest
- Dana (South Korean singer) (born 1986), South Korean pop singer

==== Other ====
- Dana Abed Kader (born 1996), Romanian-Syrian handball player
- Dana Abilda (born 1996), Kazakhstani handball player
- Dana Agisheva (born 1980), Russian actress
- Dana Al Fardan (born 1985), Qatari composer
- Dana Al Khalifa, Bahraini blogger and member of the Bahraini royal family
- Dana Al-Nasrallah (born 1988), Kuwaiti Olympic sprinter
- Dana Alston (1951–1999), American environmental justice advocate
- Dana Amir, Israeli poet and psychologist
- Dana Anderson (born 1973), Canadian former field hockey player
- Dana Andrews, American singer and musician, contestant on the TV show Rockstar: Supernova
- Dana Angluin, professor of computer science at Yale University
- Dana Antal (born 1977), Canadian ice hockey player, gold medalist at the 2002 Winter Olympics
- Dana Beth Ardi, American entrepreneur, human capitalist, author, and contemporary art collector
- Dana Arnold (born 1961), British professor of architectural history
- Dana Awartani, Palestinian-Saudi artist
- Dana Baiocco, American government official
- Dana Balcarová (born 1960), Czech politician
- Dana Barron (born 1966), American actress
- Dana Bash (born 1971), CNN News reporter and anchorwoman
- Dana Batulková (born 1958), Czech actress and local politician
- Dana Belben, American voice actress, animator, screenwriter, effects artist, and comedian
- Dana Berger (born 1970), Israeli singer-songwriter and occasional actress
- Dana Bergstrom, Australian ecologist
- Dana Berliner, American lawyer, litigation director at the Institute for Justice
- Dana Bérová (born 1967), Czech businesswoman and former government minister
- Dana Beyer (born 1952), American politician and activist
- Dana Blankstein Cohen (born 1981), Israeli filmmaker
- Dana Bolles, American space flight engineer
- Dana H. Born (born 1961), brigadier general in the United States Air Force
- Dana Bradley (died 1981), Canadian murder victim
- Dana Broccoli (1922–2004), actress and novelist, wife of producer Albert R. Broccoli, mother of producer Michael G. Wilson
- Dana Brooke (born 1988), American professional wrestler
- Dana Brožková (born 1981), Czech orienteering competitor
- Dana Brýdlová (born 1963), Czech gymnast
- Dana Buchman, fashion designer
- Dana Bunescu (born 1969), Romanian actress
- Dana Burde, American political scientist
- Dana Cameron (born 1965), American archaeologist, and author of award-winning crime fiction and urban fantasy
- Dana Canedy (born 1965), American journalist, author, publisher and Pulitzer Prize winner and administrator
- Dana R. Carney, American psychologist
- Dana Carteleanu (born 1979), Romanian rhythmic gymnast
- Dana Čechová (born 1983), Czech table tennis player
- Dana Cervantes (born 1978), Spanish Olympic pole vaulter
- Dana "Pokey" Chatman (born 1969), general manager and head coach of the Chicago Sky of the WNBA
- Dana Chisnell, American technologist
- Dana Chladek (born 1963), Czechoslovak-born American Olympic slalom kayaker and coach
- Dana Chmelařová (born 1960), Czech diver
- Dana Ciocarlie (born 1968), French pianist
- Dana Claxton (born 1959), Hunkpapa Lakota filmmaker, photographer and performance artist
- Dana Coons (born 1978), American long-distance runner
- Dana Cordell, Australian academic
- Dana Cowin, magazine editor (Food & Wine, Mademoiselle, HG)
- Dana Hudkins Crawford (1931–2025), American architectural preservationist
- Dana Cuff (born 1953), American architect, professor, and founding director of UCLA's cityLAB
- Dana Tippin Cutler, lawyer and news personality
- Dana Dajani, Palestinian actress and writer
- Dana Danilenko (born 2001), Israeli badminton player
- Dana Dattelbaum, American physicist
- Dana Davis (born 1978), American actress, known for 10 Things I Hate About You and Franklin & Bash
- Dana Dawson (1974–2010), American actress and singer
- Dana DeArmond (born 1979), American pornographic actress
- Dana Delany (born 1956), American film, stage, and television actress
- Dana DeLorenzo (born 1983), American actress
- Dana Dentata (born 1990), Canadian musician and model
- Dana Devine (died 2024), Canadian immunologist
- Dana Dobbie (born 1984), Canadian lacrosse player and coach
- Dana Dodd (1985–2006), American woman who was murdered
- Dana Dogaru (born 1953), Romanian actress
- Dana Dormann (born 1967), American professional golfer, also played as Dana Lofland
- Dana Douglas (born 1975), American judge
- Dana Drábová (1961–2025), Czech physicist and local politician
- Dana Dragomir (born 1964), Swedish musician
- Dana East (born 2002), Australian rules footballer
- Dana Eden (1973–2026), Israeli television producer
- Dana Elazar-HaLevi, Israeli children's writer
- Dana Ellis (born 1979), Canadian pole vaulter
- Dana Ellyn, American painter
- Dana Erlich (born 1980), Israeli diplomat
- Dana Eskelson (born 1965), American television, film, and theater actress
- Dana Fabe (born 1951), lawyer, Chief Justice of Alaska Supreme Court
- Dana Falconberry, American songwriter
- Dana Faletic (born 1977), Australian Olympic rower
- Dana Fecková (born 1987), Slovak football striker
- Dana Ferguson (born 1987), Canadian curler
- Dana Firas (born 1970), Jordanian royal
- Dana Fischer (born 2010), American Magic: The Gathering player
- Dana R. Fisher (born 1971), American sociologist
- Dana Fisman, Israeli computer scientist
- Dana Flynn (born 1975), also known as Didem Erol, Australian-born Turkish-American actress, model, and TV host
- Dana Foederer (born 2002), Dutch footballer
- Dana Fox (born 1976), American screenwriter
- Dana Frankfort (born 1971), New York-based artist, painting professor at Boston University College of Fine Arts
- Dana Fuchs (born 1976), American singer, songwriter, actress, and voice actress
- Dana Gaier (born 1997), American actress and singer
- Dana Gilbert (born 1959), American tennis player
- Dana Gillespie (born 1949), English actress and singer
- Dana E. Glauberman (born 1968), American film editor
- Dana Glover (born 1974), American pop singer and songwriter
- Dana Gluckstein, American visual artist and photographer
- Dana Goldberg (comedian) (born 1976)
- Dana Goldstein, American journalist and editor
- Dana Goodyear (born 1976), American journalist, poet and author, co-founder of Figment online community
- Dana G. Goski, material scientist
- Dana Gourrier, American actress
- Dana Sue Gray (born 1957), American serial killer
- Dana Grecov, Romanian-Canadian rheologist
- Dana Guth (born 1970), German politician
- Dana Guzmán (born 2003), Peruvian tennis player
- Dana Haidar (born 1993), Jordanian taekwondo competitor
- Dana Harrison (1960–2018), American business professional
- Dana Hee (born 1961), American Olympic taekwondo competitor, motivational speaker and stuntwoman
- Dana Herrmannová (1931–2024), Slovak television presenter
- Dana Hill (1964–1996), American actress and voice actor
- Dana Hoey (born 1966), American photographer
- Dana Hooker (born 1991), Australian rules footballer
- Dana G. Hoyt, president of Sam Houston State University
- Dana Humby (born 1979), former New Zealand association football player
- Dana Hussain (born 1986), sprinter on Iraq's national track and field team
- Dana Inkster, Canadian artist and filmmaker
- Dana International (born 1969), Israeli singer (stage name of Sharon Cohen), winner of the 1998 Eurovision Song Contest
- Dana Ivey (born 1941), American character actress
- Dana Ivgy (born 1982), Israeli actress
- Dana Jacobson (born 1971), American sports journalist and former ESPN anchor
- Dana Johnson, American writer
- Dana Jurásková (born 1961), Czech politician, former Minister of Health
- Dana Kerem (born 1986), Israeli football defender
- Dana Kimmell (born 1959), American actress
- Dana King (born 1960), former American TV news anchor
- Dana Kirkpatrick, New Zealand politician
- Dana Kletter (born 1959), American musician and writer
- Dana Kochavi (born 2007), Israeli chess player
- Dana Kolidzeja (born 1999), Latvian swimmer
- Dana Krumbiegel (born 1969), German footballer
- Dana Kuchtová (born 1961), Czech Green politician, former Minister of Education
- Dana Kuehn (born 1971), American judge
- Dana Kugel (born 1997), Israeli badminton player
- Dana Kursh, Israeli politician
- Dana LaCroix (born 1966), Canadian-American singer and songwriter
- Dana Layton, American politician
- Dana Lepofsky, Canadian archaeologist and ethnobiologist
- Dana Leskinen (born 2001), Finnish footballer
- Dana Levenberg, American politician
- Dana Levin (born 1965), American poet and creative writing instructor
- Dana Aliya Levinson, actress, writer and trans advocate
- Dana Lixenberg (born 1964), Dutch photographer
- Dana Loesch (born 1978), American conservative TV and radio host
- Dana Jeri Maier (born 1982), American artist and cartoonist
- Dana Mann (born 1984), American slalom canoer, formerly competed for Slovakia as Dana Beňušová
- Dana Marie, Canadian Christian rock singer
- Dana Marlowe, US social entrepreneur and activist
- Dana Martanová, former Czechoslovak slalom canoer
- Dana Marton, romantic suspense novelist
- Dana Mase, American pop singer and songwriter
- Dana Mathewson (born 1990), American wheelchair tennis player
- Dana Mathis, American pop singer and songwriter
- Dana McCauley (born 1966), Canadian chef and food writer
- Dana McKeon, Maltese musical artist
- Dana McLean, American lawyer
- Dana McVicker, American country music singer
- Donella H. "Dana" Meadows (1941–2001), American environmental scientist, teacher and writer
- Dana Medřická (1920–1983), Czechoslovak film actress
- Dana Moffat (born 1997), American rower
- Dana Morris Dixon, Jamaican politician
- Dana Moshkovitz, Israeli theoretical computer scientist
- Dana Murray, American animator and producer
- Dana Murray (politician) (born 1946)
- Dana Murphy, American Republican politician from Oklahoma
- Dana Nălbaru (born 1976), Romanian singer, songwriter, and musician, member of Hi-Q
- Dana Nechushtan (born 1970), Dutch director and screenwriter
- Dana D. Nelson (born 1962), professor of English at Vanderbilt University, progressive advocate for citizenship and democracy
- Dana Němcová (1934–2023), Czech politician and psychologist
- Dana Nessel (born 1969), American politician and lawyer
- Dana Nutu, Romanian-Australian chess player and trainer, also known as Daniela Nuțu-Gajić (born 1957)
- Dana Offenbach, American film producer
- Dana Okimoto, American former Branch Davidian
- Dana Oldfather (born 1978), American oil painter and dinnerware designer
- Dana Olmert (born 1972), Israeli left-wing activist, literary theorist and editor, daughter of Ehud Olmert
- Dana Owens, also known as Queen Latifah (born 1970), American rapper, singer and actress
- Dana Oxley (born 1967), American judge
- Dana Pe'er, bioinformatician
- Dana G. Peleg (born 1969), Israeli writer, translator, journalist and LGBTQI activist
- Dana Perino (born 1972), former White House press secretary
- Dana Perry, American filmmaker
- Dana Philpott, Canadian professor of immunology
- Dana Jean Phoenix (born 1987), Canadian musician and actress
- Dana Plato (1964–1999), American actress
- Dana Plotogea (born 1981), Romanian Olympic biathlete
- Dana Podracká (born 1954), Slovak writer
- Dana Pounds, American javelin thrower
- Dana Powell, American actress
- Dana Priest (born 1957), journalist and author, national security correspondent for The Washington Post
- Dana Procházková, Czechoslovak orienteering competitor
- Dana Protopopescu, Romanian-Belgian pianist and music instructor
- Dana Ptáčková (born 1952), Czech basketball player
- Dana Puchnarová (1938–2025), Czech painter, illustrator and graphic artist
- Dana Pyritz (born 1970), German Olympic rower
- Dana Randall (born 1968), professor of theoretical computer science at Georgia Tech
- Dana Ranga, Romanian writer and film director
- Dana Raphael (1926–2016), American medical anthropologist
- Dana Rayne (born 1981), American dance and pop singer
- Dana Reason (born 1968), Canadian pianist and composer
- Dana Reeve (1961–2006), American actress, wife of Christopher Reeve, also billed as Dana Morosini
- Dana Reizniece-Ozola (born 1981), Latvian politician and chess player
- Dana Remus, American lawyer
- Dana Rettke (born 1999), American volleyball player
- Dana Rivers, American transgender advocate and murderer
- Dana L. Robert (born 1956), historian of Christianity and a missiologist
- Dana Ron, Israeli computer scientist, professor of electrical engineering
- Dana Rotberg (born 1960), Mexican film director
- Dana Rožlapa (born 1979), Latvian cyclist
- Dana Salah (born 1989), Jordanian-Palestinian singer-songwriter
- Dana Rosemary Scallon (born 1951), Irish singer and former politician, winner of the 1970 Eurovision Song Contest, former MEP
- Dana Schechter, singer-songwriter with the band Bee and Flower
- Dana Scheriff (born 1998), American soccer player
- Dana Schoenfield (born 1953), American Olympic swimmer
- Dana Schutz (born 1976), American painter
- Dana Schwartz (born 1993), American journalist and author
- Dana Schweiger (born 1968), American television personality and businesswoman
- Dana Seetahal (1955–2014), Trinidadian politician and attorney
- Dana Sensenig (born 1984), American field hockey player
- Dana Shem-Ur (born 1990), Israeli writer
- Dana Shugar (1961–2000), American academic
- Dana Shrader (born 1956), American Olympic swimmer
- Dana Simpson (born 1977), American cartoonist (Heavenly Nostrils, Ozy and Millie)
- Dana Skelley, British civil engineer
- Dana Soumbouloglou (born 1994), Jordanian bodybuilder
- Dana Spálenská (born 1950), Czechoslovak Olympic luger
- Dana Spiotta (born 1966), American novelist
- Dana Sprengers (born 1990), Dutch BMX rider
- Dana Stabenow (born 1952), Alaskan author
- Dana Stone (1939–1970), American war photographer
- Dana Stephensen (born 1985), Australian ballerina
- Dana Strong (born 1970), American business executive
- Dana Suesse (1909–1987), American musician, composer and lyricist
- Dana L. Suskind (born 1968), American surgeon
- Dana Swanson (born 1981), American singer, actress and writer
- Dana Syslová (born 1945), Czech actress
- Dana Telem, American surgeon
- Dana Telsey, American equity research analyst
- Dana Terrace (born 1990), American cartoonist
- Dana Thomas (born 1964), American fashion and culture journalist
- Dana Tiger, Muscogee artist of Seminole and Cherokee descent
- Dana Tippin Cutler, lawyer and news personality
- Dana Todorović (born 1977), Serbian writer
- Dana Trabulsy (born 1947), American politician
- Dana Trent (born 1981), American author, teacher and minister
- Dana Trivigno (born 1994), American ice hockey player
- Dana Tuleyeva-Aketayeva (born 1986), Kazakhstani chess player
- Dana Tyler (born 1958), American local TV news anchor
- Dana Ulery (born 1938), American computer scientist
- Dana Valery (born 1944), Italian-born singer and actress
- Dana van Dreven (born 1974), also known as DJ Lady Dana, Dutch DJ
- Dana Vavřačová (born 1954), retired Czech competitive race walker
- Dana Vávrová (1967–2009), Czech-German film actress and director
- Dana Velďáková (born 1981), Slovak Olympic triple jumper
- Dana Veraldi, American artist
- Dana Vespoli, American pornographic actress and director
- Dana Vollmer (born 1987), American swimmer
- Dana T. Wade, American public official
- Dana Walden (born 1964), American businessperson
- Dana Weigel, NASA flight director
- Dana Weiss (born 1969), Israeli journalist
- Dana Wheeler-Nicholson (born 1960), American actress
- Dana A. Williams, Howard University Dean and African-American literature scholar
- Dana Winner (born 1965), Belgian singer
- Dana Wolfe (born 1963), American journalist and TV producer
- Dana Wortley (born 1959), Australian politician
- Dana Wright (born 1959), Canadian former hurdler
- Dana Wynter (1931–2011), actress
- Dana Wyse (born 1965), Canadian writer and visual artist
- Dana Young (born 1964), American politician
- Dana Youngman, New Zealand television executive
- Dana Zámečníková (born 1945), Czech sculptor
- Dana Zátopková (1922–2020), Czech javelin thrower, Olympic gold medal winner, wife of runner Emil Zátopek

=== Male ===
- Dana Allison (born 1966), American former professional baseball player
- Dana Altman (born 1958), Oregon University basketball coach
- Dana Andersen, Canadian actor, improvisor, filmmaker, writer and director
- Dana Andrews (1909–1992), American actor
- Dana Ashbrook (born 1967), American actor
- Dana Olden Baldwin (1881–1972), American physician
- Dana H. Ballard (1946–2022), American professor of computer science
- Dana Barros (born 1967), American former professional basketball player, owner of the Dana Barros Sports Complex
- Dana W. Bartlett (1860–1942), American Congregationalist minister
- Dana Beal (born 1947), American social and political activist
- Dana Bible (born 1953), American football coach and former player
- Dana X. Bible (1891–1980), American football player, coach, and athletic administrator
- Dana Boente (born 1954), Acting Attorney General of the United States
- Dana Bourgeois (born 1953), American luthier
- Dana Brinson (born 1965), former professional American football wide receiver
- Dana Brunetti (born 1973), American film producer and social networking entrepreneur
- Dana Bullen (1931–2007), American activist
- Dana Bumgardner (1954–2021), American politician
- Dana Tai Soon Burgess (born 1968), American performance artist and choreographer
- Dana Burnell (born 1963), American drummer
- Dana Carey (1903–1976), American football player
- Dana Carroll (born 1943), American molecular biologist and biochemist
- Dana Carvey (born 1955), American comedian who has appeared as a cast member of Saturday Night Live and in the Wayne's World movie series
- Dana Chambers (1895–1946), pen name of the mystery novelist Albert Leffingwell
- Dana B. Chase (1848–1897), New Mexican photographer
- Dana Childs (1922–1999), Member of the Maine House of Representatives
- Dana Chipman (born 1958), American military lawyer, former Judge Advocate General of the United States Army
- Dana L. Christensen (born 1951), American federal judge, for the District of Montana
- Dana Coin (born 1949), American football player and coach
- Dana Colley (born 1961), American musician, saxophonist in the alternative rock band Morphine
- D. C. Coolidge (1871–1955), American politician
- Dana Cooper, American singer-songwriter
- Dana Countryman (born 1954), American electronic music composer and performer, publisher of Cool and Strange Music Magazine
- Dana Curtis Covey (born 1951), American military veteran
- Dana Criswell (born 1963), American politician
- Dana Dane (born 1965 as Dana McLeese), rap artist
- Dana Lee Dembrow (born 1953), American lawyer, legislator and jurist
- Dana DeMuth (born 1956), Major League Baseball umpire
- Dana Deshler (1937–2012), member of the Ohio House of Representatives
- Dana Dimel (born 1962), American football coach and former player
- Dana A. Dorsey (1872–1940), American businessman, banker, and philanthropist
- Dana Dow, Republican former Maine state senator
- Dana Elcar (1927–2005), American television and movie character actor
- Dana Eveland (born 1983), American professional baseball pitcher
- Dana Ewell (born 1971), American convicted triple murderer
- Dana Ferrell (born 1961), American politician
- Dana Fillingim (1893–1961), American major league baseball pitcher
- Dana Ford (born 1984), American college basketball coach
- Dana Fradon (1922–2019), American cartoonist
- Dana Gartzke, American bureaucrat
- Dana Giacchetto (1962–2016), American fraudster and money manager
- Dana Gioia (born 1950), American poet
- Dana Karl Glover (born 1958), American trumpet player and music composer for video games, also known as Karl James or Dr. Dana
- Dana Goldberg (director) (born 1979), Israeli film director, poet and playwright
- Dana Goldman (born 1966), professor of economics at the University of Southern California
- Dana Gonzales (born 1963), American cinematographer
- Dana Gould (born 1964), American comedian and comedy writer
- Dana McLean Greeley (1908–1986), founding president of the Unitarian Universalist Association
- Dana Hall (American football) (born 1969), former American professional football player
- Dana Hall (musician) (born 1969), American jazz drummer, percussionist, composer, bandleader, and ethnomusicologist
- Dana Hamilton (born 1950), American hammered dulcimer player
- Dana Hammond (born 1978), American record producer, composer, songwriter, drummer and bass guitarist
- Dana Hanley, American politician, attorney and jurist
- Dana Heitman (born 1966), trumpeter for the Cherry Poppin' Daddies
- Dana Henry, American politician
- Dana Holgorsen (born 1971), American football coach and former player
- Dana Holt, professional baseball player
- Dana Howard (born 1972), former professional American football player
- Dana Jennings (born 1957), American journalist and author, New York Times editor
- Dana Kafer (1880–1937), American college football player
- Dana Evan Kaplan (born 1960), rabbi, writer on Reform Judaism and American Judaism
- Dana Key (1953–2010), American Christian rock singer and pastor
- Dana Kiecker (born 1961), former major league baseball pitcher, sportscaster
- Dana Killinger (1936–2001) American lawyer and pharmacist who served a one year term in the Kansas State Senate
- Dana M. King (1890–1952), American college football coach
- Dana Knutson, American fantasy artist, known for illustrating role-playing games
- Dana Kunze (born 1961), former champion high diver
- Dana and Ginger Lamb, American travel writer, co-wrote with his wife Ginger
- Dana Larsen (born 1971), Canadian politician
- Dana Latham (1898–1974), American attorney
- Dana Leong (born 1980), musical artist
- Dana LeVangie (born 1969), American professional baseball player, scout and coach
- Dana Lynch (born 1949), American politician
- Dana Lyons, folk music and alternative rock musician
- Dana Ahmed Majid, Iraqi Kurdish politician, former governor of Sulaymaniah
- Dana Malone (1857–1917), American politician, attorney general of Massachusetts
- Dana McKenzie, American football official
- Dana McLemore (born 1960), former professional American football cornerback
- Dana G. Mead (1936–2018), American businessman, former chairman of MIT's board of trustees
- Dana T. Merrill (1876–1957), United States Army general
- Dana Milbank (born 1968), American journalist
- Dana Mohler-Faria, American education administrator, president of Bridgewater State University
- Dana Moore (born 1961), American football player
- Dana Carleton Munro (1866–1933), American historian
- Dana Murzyn (born 1966), former Canadian professional ice hockey league player
- Dana S. Nau (born 1951), professor of computer science and systems research at the University of Maryland, College Park
- Dana Nafziger (born 1953), American football player
- Dana Nielsen, American mix engineer, audio engineer, record producer and saxophonist
- Dana Olsen, American scriptwriter
- Dana Pagett (born 1949), American professional basketball player and coach
- Dana Peterson, American political consultant, husband of Louisiana state senator Karen Carter Peterson
- Dana J. H. Pittard (born 1959), American major general
- Dana Porter (1901–1967), Canadian politician and jurist
- Dana Prieto, American politician
- Dana Quigley (born 1947), American professional golfer
- Dana Redd (born 1968), American Democratic politician, mayor of Camden, New Jersey
- Dana G. "Buck" Rinehart (1946–2015), 50th mayor of Columbus, Ohio
- Dana Rohrabacher (born 1947), U.S. Representative (R-CA)
- Dana Rosenblatt (born 1972), American world champion middleweight boxer, nicknamed "Dangerous"
- Dana Fuller Ross, pen name used by Western novelists Noel Gerson and James Reasoner
- Dana P. Rowe, American musical theater composer
- Dana Rucker (1868–1949), American college football coach
- Dana Sabraw (born 1958), United States federal judge
- Dana Sawyer (born 1951), American biographer and professor of religion
- Dana Scott (born 1932), American mathematician
- Dana Adam Shapiro, American film director
- Dana Sheridan, American flute maker
- Dana Shires (born 1932), American physician, research scientist, and inventor
- Dana A. Simmons, American air force general
- Dana Skoropad, Canadian politician
- Dana Snyder (born 1973), American comedian and actor
- Dana Snyman, South African journalist, writer and playwright
- Dana Stein (born 1958), American Democratic politician
- Dana Stinson (born 1971), American hip hop and R&B record producer, rapper and singer, known by the stage name Rockwilder
- Dana Stone (1939–1971), American photo-journalist
- Dana Strum (born 1958), heavy metal bassist (Slaughter)
- Dana Stubblefield (born 1970), American professional football defensive tackle
- Dana Summers, American cartoonist (Bound and Gagged, The Middletons)
- Dana Tomlin, American cartographer, inventor of map algebra
- Dana Tyrell (born 1989), American professional ice hockey player
- Dana Veth (born 1987), former Bahamian footballer
- Dana Wachs (born 1957), American lawyer and politician
- Dana E. Wallace (1917–2007), American biologist
- Dana Ward (born 1957), professor emeritus of political studies at Pitzer College
- Dana Wells (born 1966), retired American football nose tackle
- Dana White (born 1969), President of the UFC (Ultimate Fighting Championship)
- L. Dana Wilgress (1892–1969), Canadian diplomat
- Dana Wright (born 1963), American football player
- Dana Zimmerman, American paralympic athlete

=== Namesakes ===
- Dana Brown, several people
- Dana Evans, several people
- Dana Kirk, several people
- Dana Lewis, several people
- Dana Stevens, several people
- Dana Taylor, several people
- Dana Wilson (disambiguation)

== Fictional characters ==
- Dana, on the television show Angel
- Dana Barrett, featured in the Ghostbusters movies
- Dana Carrington, minor character in the American TV series Dynasty
- Dana Cruz, character on Zoey 101
- Dana Dearden, obsessed Superman fan who called herself Superwoman
- Dana Evans, fictional doctor in the American medical drama TV series The Pitt
- Dana Fairbanks, main character from Showtime's lesbian drama series The L Word
- Dana Foster, character on Step By Step
- Dana Knightstone, novelist, main character of the Dana Knightstone series of games
- Dana Lambert, regular character on the TV show Mission: Impossible
- Dana Mitchell, on the show Lightspeed Rescue Power Rangers
- Dana Monroe, from EastEnders
- Dana Scott, a recurring character in the television show Suits
- Dana Scully, one of the main characters on the television show The X-Files
- Dana Sterling, from the Robotech anime television series
- Dana Stevens, a trans woman featured in Chris Bohjalian's novel Trans-Sister Radio
- Dana Tan, Batman's girlfriend on the TV series Batman Beyond
- Dana Whitaker, a character in the television series Sports Night
- Dana Wolf, on the German soap opera Verbotene Liebe

== See also ==
- Dana (disambiguation)
- Donna
- Dannah
- Danaë
- Dayna
- Danna
