= Oren Lyons =

Haudenosaunee traditionalist, orator, artist, and athlete

Oren R. Lyons Jr.
- Joagquisho
- Born: 1930 (age 95–96); New York, United States
- Education: Syracuse University (BFA)

Oren R. Lyons Jr. (Onondaga: Joagquisho, born 1930) is a Haudenosaunee Faithkeeper of the Turtle Clan of both the Onondaga Nation and Seneca Nation. For more than 14 years he has been a member of the Indigenous Peoples of the Human Rights Commission of the United Nations and has had other leadership roles.

A highly recognized college lacrosse player at Syracuse University during his undergraduate years, Lyons later became increasingly active as an advocate for the rights of Indigenous peoples. He is the founder of the Haudenosaunee lacrosse team.

== Background, education, and athletic career ==
Lyons was born in 1930 and raised in the culture and practices of the Seneca and Onondaga nations in what is now Upstate New York. In the summers of 1947 and 1948, he worked as a junior counselor at Camp Onondaga on Long Lake New York. Lyons served in the United States Army.

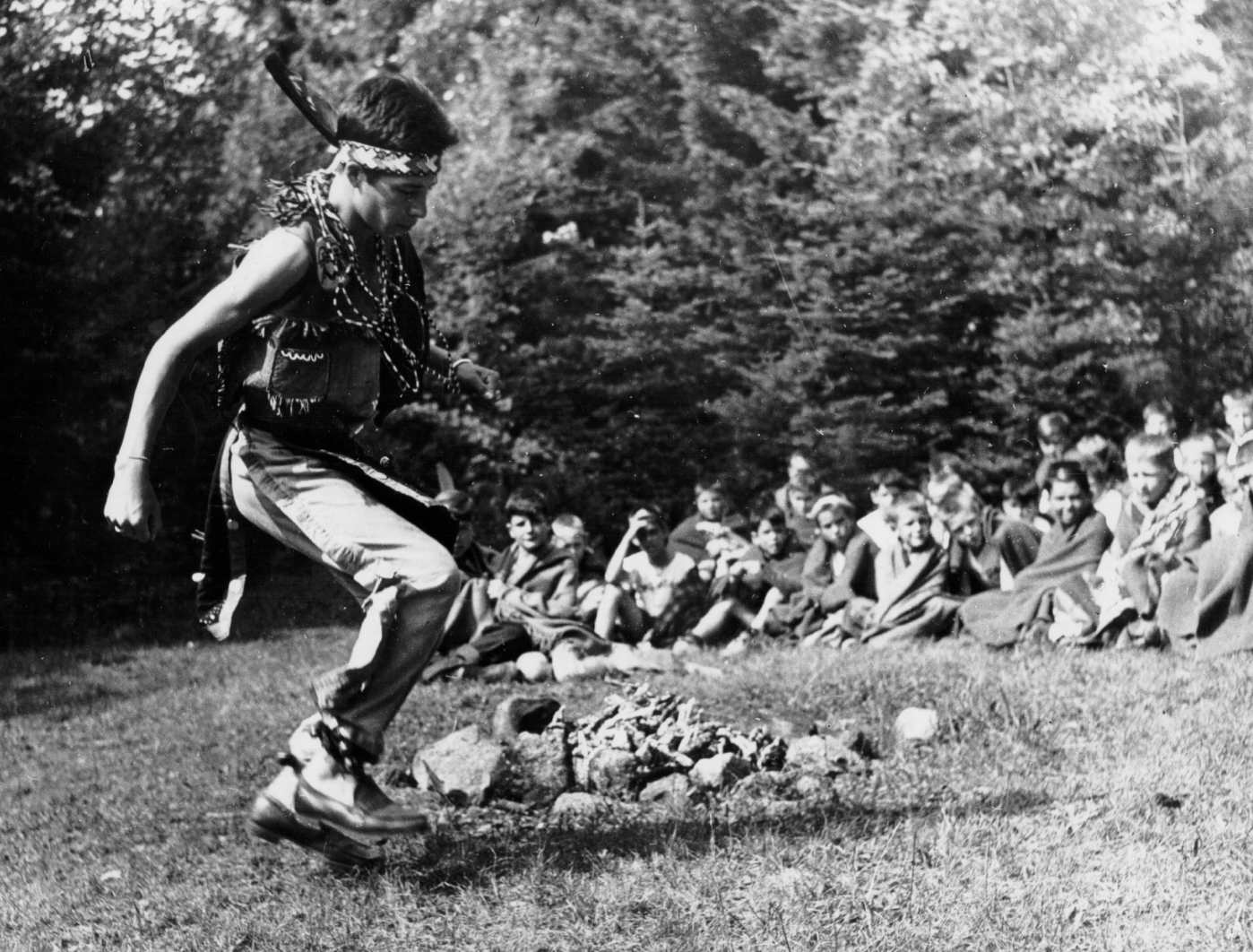
Oren Lyons, dancing at evening camp fire, Camp Onondaga, Long Lake, NY, 1947.

Lyons received an athletic scholarship in lacrosse to Syracuse University, where he was awarded the Orange Key for his academic and athletic accomplishments. He graduated from the College of Fine Arts in 1958. A lifelong lacrosse player, Oren was an All-American at Syracuse, where the Syracuse Orange men's lacrosse went undefeated during his graduating year. Athlete Jim Brown, later known for his professional football career, was also on his team. After graduation, Lyons played for several teams, including the New York Lacrosse Club (1959–1965), the New Jersey Lacrosse Club (1966–1970), and the Onondaga Athletic Club (1970–1972).

Upon leaving Syracuse, Lyons pursued a career in commercial art in New York City, becoming the art and planning director of Norcross Greeting Cards. While working for Norcross, Lyons appeared as a challenger on the February 14, 1960 episode of the popular panel game show What's My Line?.

Outside of work, Lyons exhibited his own paintings during this time. In 1970, Lyons returned to Onondaga to be closer to his cultural heritage..

He became a professor of American Studies at University at Buffalo. In recognition of his contributions over many years as a teacher of undergraduate and graduate students at the University at Buffalo, Lyons is listed as SUNY Distinguished Service Professor and professor emeritus of American Studies in the UB College of Arts and Sciences.

== Activism ==
In the 1960s, Lyons joined the Red Power movement and joined the Unity Caravan, which traveled through Indian Country to foster dialogue about traditional tribal values. In 1972, he was a leader in the Trail of Broken Treaties, a caravan to Washington, DC to convince the Bureau of Indian Affairs to honor federal treaties with Native American tribes.

In 1971, during a protest against the expansion of I-81 through the Onondaga Reservation in New York state, Lyons met with singer/songwriters John Lennon and Yoko Ono. The couple wanted to help with the protest, after arriving in Syracuse for Ono's exhibition at the Everson Museum of Art.

In 1977, Lyons helped create the Traditional Circle of Indian Elders and Youth at a meeting in Montana. Since then, the Circle has gathered annually at different sites in Indian country. In 1977, he also was part of the Haudenosaunee delegation of Iroquois representatives to the first World Conference on Racism.

"At first, I wanted to defend the Iroquois. Then my sights broadened to embrace other Indians. Then I saw this had to include defending indigenous peoples all over the world," Lyons said.

In 1981, he traveled with Stephen Gaskin and Ina May Gaskin to New Zealand to attend an indigenous festival at Nambassa, where he delivered a number of lectures and workshops. At Nambassa he coordinated with Maori land rights activists on questions of indigenous peoples sharing his Native American experiences.

For more than fourteen years he has taken part in meetings in Geneva of Indigenous Peoples of the Human Rights Commission of the United Nations. He helped to establish the Working Group on Indigenous Populations in 1982. He serves on the executive committee of the Global Forum of Spiritual and Parliamentary Leaders on Human Survival, and is a principal figure in the Traditional Circle of Indian Elders. He was a negotiator among the governments of Canada, the province of Quebec, New York State, and the Mohawk in the Oka crisis during the summer of 1990.

In 1992, Lyons addressed the General Assembly of the United Nations where he opened the International Year of the World's Indigenous Peoples.

== Representation in other media ==
Lyons was among those featured in the one-hour documentary Faithkeeper (1991), produced and hosted by Bill Moyers. It was broadcast on PBS, July 3, 1991. He also appeared in the documentary The 11th Hour (2007), directed by Leila Connors and narrated by Leonardo DiCaprio.

== Recognition ==
Lyons has been awarded an honorary Doctor of Laws degree from Syracuse University. In 2007, a three-story dormitory on Euclid Avenue owned by the university was rededicated as Oren Lyons Hall. Lyons serves on the board of the Harvard Project on American Indian Economic Development and is board chairman of Honoring Contributions in the Governance of American Indian Nations.

He has received the Ellis Island Medal of Honor, the National Audubon Society's Audubon Medal, the Earth Day International Award of the United Nations, and the Elder and Wiser Award of the Rosa Parks Institute for Human Rights. In 2022, he received a Lifetime Achievement Award at the Indian Gaming Association's Tradeshow and Convention.

An honorary chairman of the Haudenosaunee Nationals, Lyons has received high recognition for his lacrosse playing:

- 1988: Inducted into the Syracuse University hall of fame.
- 1989: Named Man of the Year in Lacrosse by the NCAA.
- 1993: Inducted into the National Lacrosse Hall of Fame.
- 1998: Inducted into the Ontario, Canada Lacrosse Hall of fame.
- 2000: Inducted into the Upstate New York Chapter of USA Lacrosse Hall of Fame.
- 2008: Inducted into the Native American Hall of fame. Ceremony held at the Seneca Nation Casino in Niagara Falls, NY.
- 2023: Awarded the Order of Sport, marking induction into Canada's Sports Hall of Fame, as a builder of his sport.

== Published works ==
In addition to his writings, Lyons has collaborated on illustrating several children's books by Virginia Driving Hawk Sneve. He has written about indigenous issues, economic development and spiritual culture. He is the publisher of Daybreak Magazine.

- Lyons, Oren, Donald Grinde, Robert Venables, John Mohawk, Howard Berman, Vine Deloria Jr., Laurence Hauptman, and Curtis Berkey. Exiled in the Land of the Free: Democracy, Indian Nations and the U.S. Constitution. Santa Fe: Clear Light Publications, 1992/reprint1998. ISBN 978-0-940666-50-4.
- Lyons, Oren. Wilderness in Native American Culture. Boise: University of Idaho Wilderness Research Center, 1989. ASIN B00072A6JG.
- Oren Lyons, author. Voice of Indigenous Peoples: Native People Address the United Nations, Ewen, Alexander, ed.; Santa Fe: Clear Light Publications, 1993. ISBN 978-0-940666-31-3.
- Lyons, Oren, contributor, "Listening to Natural Law." in Spiritual Ecology, Vaughan-Lee, Llewellyn, ed.; Point Reyes: The Golden Sufi Center, 2013.

=== Children's books ===
- Sneve, Virginia Driving Hawk. (Brulé Lakota), author, and Oren Lyons, illustrator. Jimmy Yellow Hawk. Holiday House, 1972. ASIN B001KRU62Y.
- Lyons, Oren, author and illustrator. Dog Story. Holiday House, 1973. ASIN B003BGS43K.
- Sneve, Virginia Driving Hawk, author, and Oren Lyons, illustrator. When Thunders Spoke. Bison Books, 1993. ISBN 978-0-8032-9220-8.
- Sneve, Virginia Driving Hawk, author, and Oren Lyons, illustrator. High Elk's Treasure. Holiday House, 1995. ISBN 978-0-8234-0212-0.

=== Other contributions ===
- Gluckstein, Dana, author; Amnesty International, epilogue; Oren Lyons, introduction; Archbishop Desmond Tutu, foreword. Dignity: In Honor of the Rights of Indigenous Peoples. powerHouse Books, 2010. ISBN 978-1-57687-562-9
- Jorgensen, William, ed.; Oren Lyons, foreword. Rebuilding Native Nations: Strategies for Governance and Development. University of Arizona Press, 2007. ISBN 978-0-8165-2423-5.

== Legacy ==
In 2025, Lyons agreed to donate his personal papers, including correspondence and photographic collections to Syracuse University's Special Collections Research Center.

== See also ==
- List of indigenous artists of the Americas
