= Whyman =

Whyman is a surname. Notable people with the surname include:

- Alfred Whyman (1884–?), English footballer
- Djaran Whyman (born 1983), Australian rules footballer
- Erica Whyman (born 1969), English theatre director
- Kevin Whyman (1975–2015), English rower
- Matt Whyman (born 1969), English writer
- Phil Whyman (born 1971), English musician

== See also ==
- Dayna Berghan-Whyman, New Zealand medieval fighter
- Jada Mathyssen-Whyman (born 1999), Australian soccer player
