= Protopopescu =

Protopopescu is a Romanian surname. Notable people with the surname include:

- Atanasie Protopopescu (1900–1991), Romanian athlete and sports official
- Dana Protopopescu, Romanian pianist
- Dragoș Protopopescu (1892–1948), Romanian writer, poet, critic, and philosopher
- Luca Protopopescu (born 2016), French chess player
- Ștefan Protopopescu (1886–1929), Romanian officer and aviation pioneer
