= Daniel Ross =

Daniel, Danny, Dan, named Ross may refer to:

== People ==
- Daniel Ross (philosopher) (born 1970), Australian philosopher and filmmaker
- Daniel Ross (marine surveyor) (1780–1849), president of the Bombay Geographical Society
- Daniel Ross (defensive lineman) (born 1993), American football defensive tackle
- Danny Ross (comedian) (1931–1976; born Ronald Crabtree), British comedian and actor
- Danny Ross (musician) (born 1984; Danny Philip Ross), Australian folk, blues and progressive musician
- Dan Ross (American football) (1957–2006; Daniel Richard Ross), American football tight end
- Dan Ross (novelist) (1912–1995; William Edward Daniel Ross), Canadian novelist
- Daniel I. Ross Jr. (1923–2008), chairman of the South Carolina Republican Party

== Fictional characters ==
- Danny Ross (Law & Order: Criminal Intent) (also Daniel Ross), fictional character on American TV series Law & Order: Criminal Intent

== See also ==
- Dana Fuller Ross
- Dana Ross
