= Danuta (disambiguation) =

Danuta is a Polish given name.

Danuta may also refer to:

- Danuta, fictional planet in the Star Wars franchise
- Danuta (armoured train), Polish armoured train used during the invasion of Poland in 1939
