= Bannerman Fellowship =

Fellowship program

The Alston/Bannerman Fellowship Program, based in Baltimore, Maryland, is committed to advancing progressive social change by helping to sustain long-time activists of color. The program honors those who have devoted their lives to helping their communities organize for racial, social, economic and environmental justice. The program provides resources for organizers to take sabbaticals for reflection and renewal. Since 1988, there have been 171 Fellows. They've worked on a broad range of issues from environmental justice to fair wages, from immigrant rights to native sovereignty, from political empowerment to economic revitalization. They are from 32 states, the District of Columbia, Puerto Rico and Guam.

Established in 1987, the Alston/Bannerman Fellowship Program was founded on the belief that the most effective approach to achieving progressive social change is by organizing low-income people at the grassroots level. Many elements contribute to a community organization's success, but none are more important than the vision, commitment, talent and hard work of its organizers and leaders. Yet few resources are available to support them and, as a result, too many experienced organizers "burn-out" and too few younger ones see organizing as a viable long-term profession. The Program's founders decided that a practical contribution to strengthening community organizing would be to give organizers an opportunity to step back from their work for a period of reflection and renewal. They created the sabbatical program, now called the Alston/Bannerman Fellowship Program.

The program is named for Charles Bannerman had worked with Mississippi Action for Community Education (MACE), an organization founded by Fannie Lou Hamer, Annie Devine and other local civil rights leaders; and Dana Alston, an activist who worked with the National Black United Fund, the Southern Rural Women's Network, Rural America, TransAfrica Forum and the National Committee for Responsive Philanthropy.
