= Telsey =

Telsey is a surname. Notable people with the surname include:

- Bernard Telsey (born 1960), American casting director
- Dana Telsey (born 1962), American consultant and equity research analyst
