= Danusia =

Danusia is a Polish feminine given name. It may be a diminutive from the given names Danuta and Dana.

Notable people with the name include:

- Danusia Francis, British artistic gymnast who represented Jamaica at the 2020 Olympic Games
- Danusia Barbara (1948–2015), Brazilian journalist and food critic
- Danusia Jurandówna, a character from the novel The Knights of the Cross by Polish author Henryk Sienkiewicz
- Dinusia was a nom de guerre of Danuta Letowt (1926-1944), a liaison officer and medic of a Home Army detachment

== See also ==
- Villa Danusia, historical villa in Poland
