= NBUF =

NBUF may refer to:

- National Black United Fund
- National Black United Front
