= Dana Alston =

American environmental justice advocate

Dana Alston (December 1951 – August 7, 1999) was an environmental justice advocate. She revolutionized the fight for environmental justice, by combining climate activism with a concern for environmental pollution experienced by communities of color.

== Early life and education ==
Dana Alston was born on December 18, 1951, in Harlem, New York to parents Garlen and Betty Alston. From the beginning of her schooling she demonstrated interest helping fellow people of color. Alston received her higher education from Wheelock College in Boston. She was the president of the institution's Black Student Union, she advocated for more African American courses and an increase in black faculty. She graduated in 1973 with a bachelor of science degree. She was a graduate student in the School of Public Health at Columbia University, with a Master's degree in occupational and environmental health.

== Activism ==
Alston is known for her contribution and participation in various grassroot organizations. Her social justice work consisted of fundraising and advocating for communities that are often subjected to environmental neglect and suffer from its consequences. In relation to fundraising activities, she was the president of the National Black United Fund(NBUF). The NBUF allowed workers to make contributions to a charitable fund that was led and organized by the Black community. She co-founded the Southern Rural Women's Network, worked on pesticide issues with farmers in Rural America. Most notably, Alston co-convened the first National People of Color summit in 1991, which rallied various environmental activists to stand united to work towards a common goal in environmental justice. Dana's participation in the summit assisted in the foundation for the Principles of Environmental Justice. She was a senior program officer for Public Welfare Foundation(PWF) Environmental Initiative, a program that supported the improvement of the environment with the use of grants.

== Recognition and legacy ==
Alston was recognized for her advocacy, receiving many awards throughout her lifetime. She received a grant from the Charles Bannerman memorial fellowship, after leading a delegation at Rio de Janeiro for the Earth Summit and Global Forum meeting in 1992. After suffering from kidney disease, Alston died at the age of 47 on August 7, 1999. Following her death, her family created and named a fund after her, the Bannerman Fellowship. It was intended to honor her memory and dedication.

In 2023, Rachel F. Seidman, curator of women's environmental history at the Anacostia Community Museum, said that Alston's activism inspired her exhibit To Live and Breathe: Women and Environmental Justice in Washington, D.C., which highlights women in environmental activism such as Brenda Richardson, Tina Pham, and Siobhan Ollivierre.
