= Dana Brown =

Dana Brown is the name of:

- Dana Brown (baseball) (born 1967), baseball executive
- Dana Brown (filmmaker), (born 1959), American filmmaker and surfer
- Dana Rosemary Scallon (born Rosemary Brown, born 1950), Irish singer ("Dana"), turned politician
- Dana Brown (pageant contestant) in Miss Tennessee, 1990
- Dana Brown (diplomat), U.S. diplomat, United States Ambassador to Cape Verde

== See also ==
- Brown (surname)
- Dana (given name)
- Dana (disambiguation)
- Brown (disambiguation)
