= Danutė =

Danutė is Lithuanian female given name. Women named Danutė include:

- Elzbieta, sometimes also known as Danmila or Danutė (14th century), daughter of Gediminas, Grand Duke of Lithuania (see family of Gediminas)
- Danutė of Lithuania (15th century), daughter of Kęstutis, Grand Duke of Lithuania
- Danutė Budreikaitė (born 1953), Lithuanian politician and Member of the European Parliament
- Danutė Jočienė (born 1970), Lithuanian lawyer and a representative of Lithuania in the European Court of Human Rights
- Kazimira Danutė Prunskienė (born 1943), Lithuanian politician and former Prime Minister

== See also ==
- Danuta – Polish equivalent
