= Dayna =

Dayna is a given name. Among languages that use this name is Latvian, in which it (also spelled Daina) broadly means 'a collection of the best and most beautiful.' For example, 'The Daina of music.' In contemporary adaptations of the name variations of the spelling of the name include "Dayna" or "Dana". As with most names ending in 'a', it is a name associated with the feminine.

Notable people with the name Dayna include:

- Dayna Berghan-Whyman, medieval fighter from New Zealand
- Dayna Curry (born 1971), an American aid worker who was captured by the Taliban
- Dayna Cussler, an American film producer, writer, and actress
- Dayna Deruelle (born 1982), a Canadian curler
- Dayna Devon (born 1965), an American journalist
- Dayna Edwards (born 1985), an Australian rugby union player
- Dayna Kurtz, an American singer-songwriter
- Dayna Manning (born 1978), a Canadian singer-songwriter
- Dayna Bowen Matthew (fl. 1980s–2020s), American law school dean
- Dayna Stephens (born 1978), an American musician and composer
- Dayna Vawdrey (born 1982), a New Zealand television presenter

== Fictional characters ==
- Dayna Jenkins, a character in Shortland Street
- Dayna Jurgens, a character in The Stand
- Dayna Mellanby, a character in Blake's 7
