= Dana Bolles =

American spaceflight engineer

- Education: Cal State Long Beach; San Francisco State University
- Known for: disability rights advocacy
- Awards: 2014 NASA Equal Employment Opportunity Medal
- Scientific career
- Fields: Rehabilitation engineering
- Workplaces: NASA

Dana Bolles is an American spaceflight engineer and advocate for those with disabilities in STEM. She has worked at NASA since 1995 in a variety of fields. She is also an ambassador for the American Association for the Advancement of Science's If/then initiative.

== Early life and education ==
Bolles was born without arms or legs. She has stated that she became interested in visiting space at an early age since it would allow her to move without the assistance of her wheelchair, but she never achieved it.

She credited teachers who accepted her in mainstream classrooms as very important to setting her on a path for success in her chosen career.

Bolles earned a bachelor's degree in mechanical engineering from California State University, Long Beach in 1993, and has a master's degree in rehabilitation engineering and technology from San Francisco State University.

== Career ==
Bolles started working at NASA in 1995 as an engineer in regulatory compliance, including work on environmental regulations. This later expanded to work in protecting humans in outer space and scientific communications.

She also volunteers as an advocate for women, people with disabilities, and members of the LGBT community. Her advocacy has a particular focus on the challenges that people with disabilities encounter in their lives, and has spoken about the stereotypes they often face, mentioning that people tend to respond the most to disability compared to other intersectionalities.

In 2021 Bolles joined a group of people with physical disabilities in a zero gravity parabolic flight.

Bolles was one of the women depicted in the Smithsonian Institution's 2022 exhibit spotlighting women in STEM.

== Awards and recognition ==
- NASA Equal Employment Opportunity Medal (2014)
