= Dana Okimoto =

American former Branch Davidian

Dana Okimoto (born c. 1966) is an American former Branch Davidian. She moved to Waco, Texas, from Los Angeles, California, in approximately 1988 with Robyn Bunds, a former Branch Davidian turned critic. She is originally from Hawaii and is a registered psychiatric nurse at Kaneohe State Hospital, and remarried to Roy Kiyabu, a chef, as of 2003. She gave birth to Sky or Skye Borne Okimoto (born c. September 1988 in Torrance, California) and Scooter Okimoto (born c. April 1991 in the Mount Carmel Center), who are both children of David Koresh, the leader of the Branch Davidians.

== Conversion and leaving the Branch Davidians ==
Dana Okimoto was first introduced to David Koresh – going by his birth name, Vernon Wayne Howell – after hearing him preach in a Kaimuki church in 1986. She moved to California in a Davidian-owned property in approximately 1988 and traveled to the Mount Carmel Center at least once. She was eventually converted after help from Marc Breault and Steve Schneider.

Koresh started a sexual relationship with Okimoto in August 1987. She was one of numerous "wives" he had in the late 1980s and early 1990s. Koresh chose the name "Skye" for her first son with him. While with the Branch Davidians, Okimoto physically abused her son Sky with a wooden paddle.

Okimoto with her two sons left the Branch Davidians in 1992 before the Bureau of Alcohol, Tobacco, and Firearms (ATF) attempted a raid on the compound. She left after Koresh scolded her for taking Sky to the hospital for a broken arm while in California. She reportedly began to question Koresh's teachings before leaving.

Dana Okimoto and her sons were not in the Mount Carmel Center in Waco, Texas, during the Waco siege. She was in Hawaii attending University of Hawaiʻi School of Nursing while the siege took place.

Okimoto during the Waco siege and after interviewed with federal law enforcement and the American press about the nature of the Branch Davidians and David Koresh, including how Koresh's "mighty men" were told to kill Koresh's wives in case they could not kill themselves in the event of their capture or how Koresh prophesied the federal government would kill him. She also told federal investigators that if Koresh died before his followers, then everyone would kill themselves. She also told the Associated Press that she believed Koresh did not release twelve of the seventeen children who died in the April 19, 1993, fire that ended the siege because he knew that the mothers would not receive custody through the state since he fathered them. She also told the Courier-Mail that he did not release the children because "he was afraid they would be polluted by the world's ideas".
