= Didem Erol =

Turkish-American actress

Didem Erol (Serah Henesey)
- Born: 1 October 1975 (age 50); Sydney, New South Wales, Australia
- Other names: Dana Flynn
- Citizenship: Australian; Turkish; American
- Occupation(s): Actress, host, model
- Years active: 2000–present
- Partner: Quentin Tarantino (2007–2011)

Didem Erol or Serah Henesey also known as Dana Flynn is an Australian-born Turkish American actress, model, and TV host. She was born in Sydney to Turkish parents and lives in Los Angeles, California. Amidst media speculation, Erol confirmed she was dating Quentin Tarantino whom she met in Cannes, France. Erol's relationship with the American film director Tarantino ended after four years. She is also close friends with Oliver Stone. Holding multiple citizenships, Erol is fluent in English and Turkish.

== Filmography ==
Year	Title	Role	Notes
2000	Canlı Hayat	Jale	TV movie
2000	Femmes ou maîtresses (The Donor)	Art student	Movie
2001	Survival of the Prettiest	Herself	TV documentary
2001	The Accidental Spy	Mob boss's girlfriend	Movie
2004	Omuz Omuza	Olcay	TV series
2004–2008	Avrupa Yakası	Victoria	TV series
2005	Balans ve Manevra	Helen	Movie
2005	Yine De Aşığım	Aybige	TV miniseries
2005	Emret Komutanım	Doctor	TV series
2006	The Contract	Reporter	Movie
2006	Eksik Etek	Miss Turkey Demet	TV series
2006	Dünyayı Kurtaran Adam'ın Oğlu	Caroline	Movie
2006	Doktorlar		TV series
2006	Arka Sokaklar	Singer Feyza Işık	TV series
2007	Ç.Ö.T. (Çok Özel Tim)	Tuğba Kalın	TV series
2008	Yaşar Ne Yaşar Ne Yaşamaz	Didem	TV movie
2008	Süper Ajan K9	Agent K-9 Ayşe Kosovalı	Movie
2008	Gazoz Ağacı	Sevda	TV series
2008	Gonca Karanfil	Sevda	TV series
2008	Doomsday		Movie
2008	Avanak Kuzenler		Movie
2009	Double Identity	Eva	Movie
2009	Annihilation Earth	Ellie	TV movie
2010	Kukuriku: Kadın Krallığı	Kodurgalı	Movie
2012	Acayip Hikâyeler		TV series (Episode 8)
2012	The Pod (Alien Hunger)	Jenny Gibson	Movie
2022	The Surprise Visit	Juliette	Movie
