= Dana Taylor =

Dana Taylor may refer to:

- Dana Taylor (Desperate Housewives), a character on US TV series Desperate Housewives
- Dana Taylor, Playboy's Playmate of the month July 2017
