= Dana Evans (disambiguation) =

Dana Evans (born 1998) is an American basketball player.

Dana Evans may also refer to:

- Dana Evans (athletic director) (1874–1924), American athlete, coach and athletics administrator
- Dana Evans (The Pitt), fictional nurse in the American drama series The Pitt
- Dana Evans, fictional news presenter in the 2001 crime novel The Sky Is Falling (Sheldon novel)
