= Dana Curtis Covey =

American military veteran

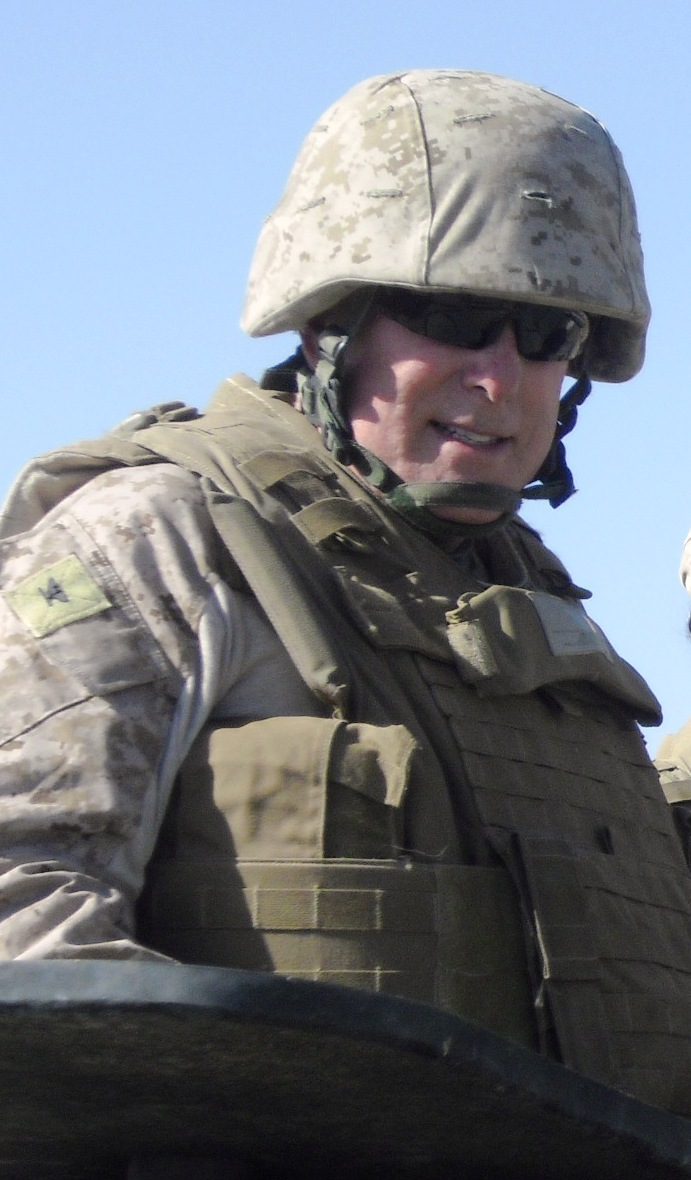

Personal details
- Born: March 27, 1951 (age 74) Woodland, California
- Education: U.S. Naval Academy (BS), University of Idaho (MSc), University of Washington (MD
- Occupation: Naval officer, Orthopaedic Surgeon and Professor of Orthopaedic Surgery
- Awards: Legion of Merit (2) Bronze Star Medal

Military service
- Allegiance: United States
- Branch/service: United States Navy
- Years of service: 1973-2013
- Rank: Captain
- Battles/wars: Persian Gulf Exigency; Gulf War; Balkans War; Haiti Intervention; Tamil War (Sri Lanka); Iraq War; Afghanistan War

Dana Curtis Covey (born March 27, 1951) is an American orthopaedic surgeon and retired United States Navy captain. He served as a military surgeon in several conflicts and is a clinical professor of orthopaedic surgery at the University of California, San Diego. His published work addresses blast injuries and the care of combat casualties.

== Early life and education ==
Covey was born in Woodland, California. He attended the United States Naval Academy, where he studied oceanography, and later completed a master's degree in immunology and zoology at the University of Idaho. He received his M.D. from the University of Washington School of Medicine in 1984.

== Military career ==
Covey first deployed as a surgeon during the Persian Gulf War in 1991. He later said the experience led him to focus on the gap between the extremity injuries seen in combat and the orthopaedic training of forward surgical teams. He helped develop a tent-based field hospital training facility at Naval Hospital Bremerton, used to train medical personnel in field equipment.

During the Yugoslav Wars in the 1990s, he served at a U.S. Navy field hospital and later published a study of the blast wounds treated there. From 2001 he was chief of surgery at the U.S. Naval Hospital Okinawa, where he was involved in developing the Mobile Shipboard Surgical Suite, later renamed the Emergency Resuscitative Surgical System.

In 2004 Covey was officer-in-charge of a Marine Corps forward resuscitative surgery team at Camp Fallujah in Iraq, where the team treated 449 patients with combat-related injuries over eight months. He later served in Afghanistan with a Marine forward surgical team.

Covey was the Navy's senior orthopaedic consultant and chaired the Department of Orthopaedic Surgery at Naval Medical Center San Diego. He retired from the Navy as a captain.

== Academic career ==
Covey is a clinical professor of orthopaedic surgery at the University of California, San Diego, and also practices at the San Diego VA medical center.

== Research ==
Covey's research concerns orthopaedic injuries sustained in combat. In a 2002 review in The Journal of Bone and Joint Surgery he described the features and management of blast and fragment injuries of the musculoskeletal system. He has written that blast injuries, long associated with battlefields, are increasingly seen among civilians because of terrorism. In 2007 he told Reuters that techniques developed for battlefield trauma could be applied to civilian injuries.

Later work includes a review of orthopaedic junctional injuries, a prospective case series on field tourniquet use by a forward surgical team, and a study of a pelvic protection system worn in Afghanistan.

== Selected articles ==
- Covey, D. C. (1992). “Fleet hospitals could be better.” U.S. Naval Institute Proceedings, 118, 60–63.
- Covey, D. C., & Sapega, A. A. (1993). “Injuries of the posterior cruciate ligament.” The Journal of Bone and Joint Surgery. American Volume, 75(9), 1376–1386.
- Covey, D. C., Sapega, A. A., & Sherman, G. M. (1996). “Testing for isometry during reconstruction of the posterior cruciate ligament: anatomic and biomechanical considerations.” The American Journal of Sports Medicine, 24(6), 740–746.
- Covey, D. C. (2001). “Injuries of the posterolateral corner of the knee.” The Journal of Bone and Joint Surgery. American Volume, 83(1), 106.
- Covey, D. C. (2002). “Blast and fragment injuries of the musculoskeletal system.” The Journal of Bone and Joint Surgery. American Volume, 84(7), 1221–1234.
- Covey, D. C., Hancock, J. L., & Plurad, D. S. (2005). “The mobile shipboard surgical suite: a new approach to forward maritime surgery.” U.S. Naval Institute Proceedings, 131, 76–77.
- Covey, D. C. (2006). “Combat orthopedics: a view from the trenches.” JAAOS: Journal of the American Academy of Orthopaedic Surgeons, 14(10 Suppl.), S10–S17.
- Covey, D. C. (2009). “From the frontlines to the home front: the crucial role of military orthopaedic surgeons.” The Journal of Bone and Joint Surgery. American Volume, 91, 998–1006.
- Covey, D. C., Sandoval, K. E., & Riffenburgh, R. H. (2018). “Contrast-enhanced magnetic resonance imaging evaluation of bone-patellar tendon-bone and hamstring anterior cruciate ligament autograft healing in humans: a prospective, randomized study.” Orthopaedic Journal of Sports Medicine, 6(10)
- Covey, D. C., & Schwartz, A. K. (2019). “Orthopaedic junctional injuries.” The Journal of Bone and Joint Surgery, 101(19), 1783–1792.
- Covey, D. C., & Gentchos, C. E. (2022). “Field tourniquets in an austere military environment: A prospective case series.” Injury, 53(10), 3240–3247.
- Covey, D. C. (2023). “Decreasing lower extremity junctional and perineal injury from explosive blast with a pelvic protection system.” Injury, 54(7).

== Awards and honors ==
=== Civilian ===
- 1984 – Sigma Xi Scientific Research Honor Society
- 1984 – Robert H. Williams Research Prize, University of Washington School of Medicine
- 1990 – North American Traveling Fellowship, American Orthopaedic Association
- 1997–- Chairman of the Joint Chiefs of Staff Award for Excellence in Military Medicine awarded as one of the nation's top military physicians
- 2008 – Colonel Brian Allgood Memorial Award for Excellence in Military Orthopaedic Leadership
- 2019 – William W. Tipton Jr., MD Leadership Award, American Academy of Orthopaedic Surgeons
- 2025 – University of Washington Distinguished Alumni Veteran Award for “extraordinary personal standards of competency and dedication to service and integrity, transcend his international reputation as one of the world’s leading authorities on combat surgery.”
- 2026 Orthopaedic Research and Education Foundation Clinical Research Award

== Awards and decorations ==

Surface Warfare Officer Insignia
Legion of Merit with gold award star / Bronze Star Medal
Meritorious Service Medal with two gold award stars	Navy and Marine Corps Commendation Medal with gold award star	Navy and Marine Corps Achievement Medal with gold award star
Combat Action Ribbon	Joint Meritorious Unit Award with Oak Leaf Cluster	Navy Unit Commendation with two bronze service stars
Meritorious Unit Commendation with four bronze service stars	National Defense Service Medal with two bronze service stars	Armed Forces Expeditionary Medal
Afghanistan Campaign Medal	Iraq Campaign Medal with FMF Combat Operation insignia	Global War on Terrorism Expeditionary Medal with FMF Combat Operation insignia
Global War on Terrorism Service Medal	Vietnam Service Medal with bronze service star	Southwest Asia Service Medal with bronze service star
Armed Forces Service Medal with bronze service star	Navy Sea Service Deployment Ribbon with three bronze service stars	Navy Overseas Service Ribbon with three bronze service stars
Armed Forces Reserve Medal with hourglass and M devices	Humanitarian Service Medal with bronze service star	Philippine Presidential Unit Citation
NATO Medal with bronze service star	United Nations Protection Force Medal (former Yugoslavia)	Kuwait Liberation Medal (Saudi Arabia)
Kuwait Liberation Medal (Kuwait)	Navy Rifle Marksmanship Ribbon	Navy Pistol Sharpshooter Ribbon
Fleet Marine Force Warfare Officer Insignia
Surface Warfare Medical Department Officer Insignia
