= Dana Soumbouloglou =

Jordanian bodybuilder

Personal information
- Nationality: Jordan, Greek
- Born: Amman
- Years active: 2012-present
- Height: 159.5 cm (5 ft 3 in)
- Weight: 65 kg (143 lb) Offseason and 55 kg onseason.

Dana Soumbouloglou (Arabic: دانا سمبولوغلو) is a Jordanian natural bodybuilder, figure competitor athlete, and certified personal trainer. She is considered Jordan's first active female bodybuilder to compete internationally. She competed in the Stephanie Worsfold Natural Classic in Canada in 2018 and placed second, and in the Olympia Amateur in Las Vegas in 2019 and got 1st callout.
