= Dana Philpott =

Canadian professor of immunology

- Education: University of Calgary; University of Toronto
- Known for: Immunology; Infectious diseases; Microbiota
- Scientific career
- Workplaces: Pasteur Institute; University of Toronto

Dana Philpott is a professor of immunology at the University of Toronto.

== Biography ==
Dana Philpott completed a B.Sc. in biology from the University of Calgary, and then completed her graduate studies in the department of microbiology at the University of Toronto. By the time she graduated, the departments of microbiology and genetics had merged, and Philpott became the first microbiologist with a PhD from the department of molecular genetics and microbiology at the University of Toronto. She studied enterohemorrhagic and enteropathogenic E.coli under Philip Sherman.

Philpott completed two years of postdoctoral training at McMaster University with Mary Perdue, before moving to France and working at the Pasteur Institute with Philippe Sansonetti. Ten years after graduating, she returned to the University of Toronto as professor in the department of immunology.

== Research ==
Philpott's research work focuses on Crohn's disease, colitis, and intestinal inflammation.

Philpott and fellow professor Ken Croitoru won a $15-million grant from the Canadian Foundation for Innovation which they used to found the University of Toronto Host-Microbiome Research Network.

== Awards and recognition ==
Philpott's research has been highly recognized. She has received the Marie Curie Research Training Grant, the CIHR Post-Doctoral Fellowship Award, the EMBO Young Investigator Award, the 2011 CIHR New Investigator Award, a 2015 Canadian Society for Immunology investigator award, and a 2018 Canada Research Chair.

== Personal life ==
Philpott is married to Stephen Girardin, an associate professor and fellow researcher at the University of Toronto.
