= Dana Wyse =

Canadian writer and visual artist

- Born: 9 August 1965 (age 60); Vancouver, British Columbia
- Education: BFA, University of British Columbia
- Known for: Installation art
- Movement: Feminism

Dana Wyse (born August 9, 1965) is a Canadian writer and visual artist.

== Life ==
Wyse received her BFA from the University of British Columbia in 1991. She lives and works in Vancouver, British Columbia.

== Work ==
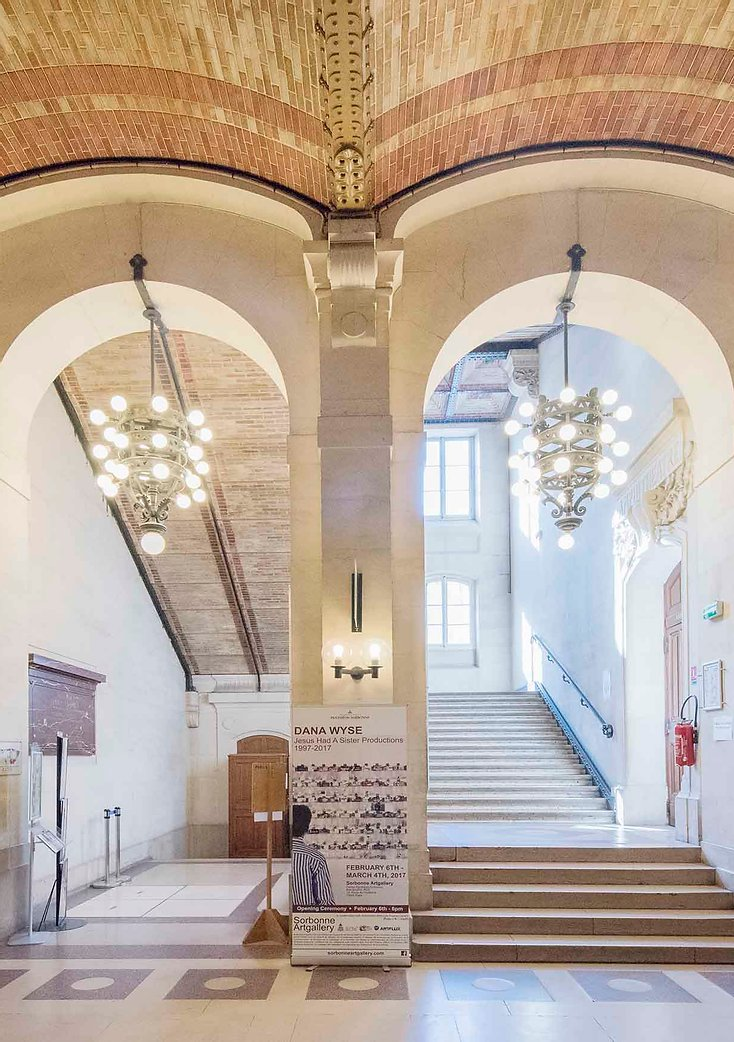
Exhibition Jesus Had a Sister Productions 1997–2017, Grand staircase Sorbonne Université

Wyse's early career was characterized by photography works exploring Canada and its history and environment. Photography works by Wyse can be seen in the book Vancouver: A History in Photographs. In 1996, Wyse began her best known artwork, a pill-themed installation called Jesus Had A Sister Productions. It is a work-in-progress to which the artist adds new elements each year and that crosses the line between art and business.

=== Jesus Had a Sister Productions ===
This work, Wyse's longest running work, takes the form of a fictional pharmaceutical company. Each instalment is a series of pills, sprays, occasionally children's toys and other media. These objects are packaged in plastic with a cardboard heading stapled to the top that lists their purpose. The work dissects aspects of human relationships such as trust, love, communication, pleasure and power. Woman's utopic quest for perfection, achieved in instant time, is the underlying philosophy of Jesus Had A Sister Productions. Wyse incorporates advertising images from the 1960s into her work to underline the absurdity of these images as well as woman's lust for shopping and mass consumption.

== Exhibitions ==
Wyse has participated in many solo and group exhibitions. The artist had solo exhibitions at Artcore Gallery in Toronto (2001), Third Avenue Gallery in Vancouver (2001), Galerie Anton Weller in Paris (2001), Torch Gallery in Amsterdam (2002), New Art Barcelona (2002), and many other locations.

Château de Montsoreau-Musée d'art contemporain (2017)

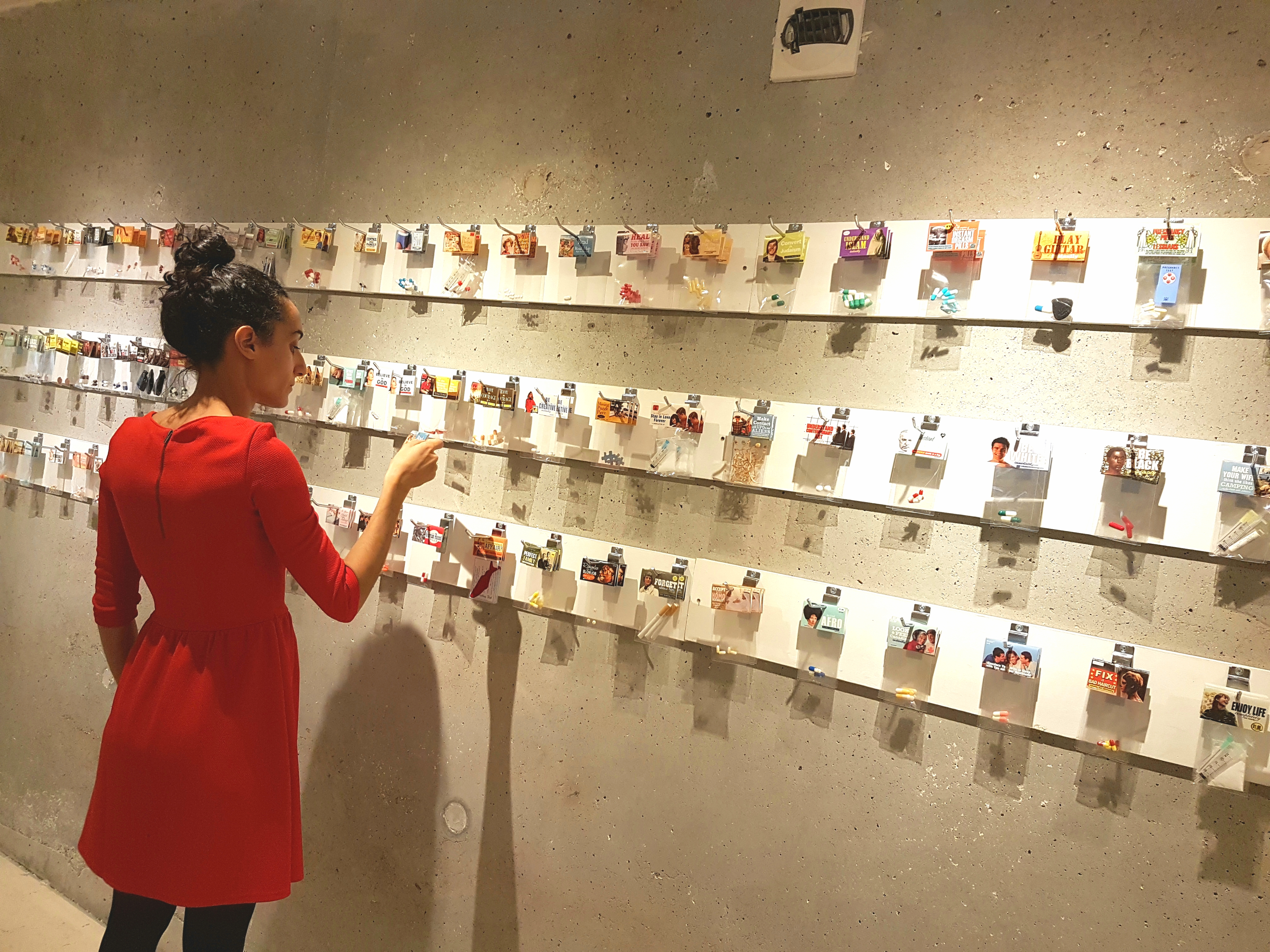

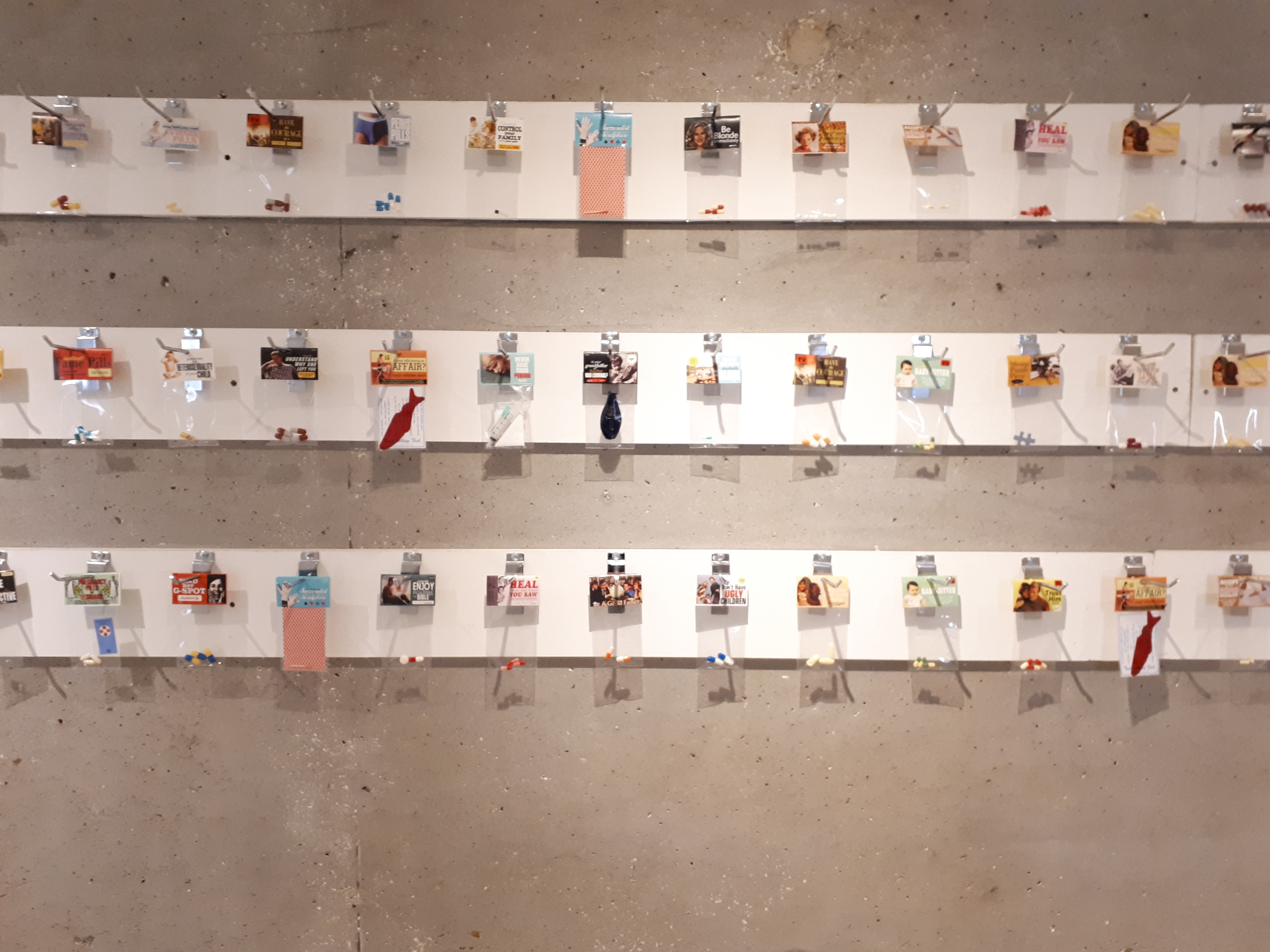

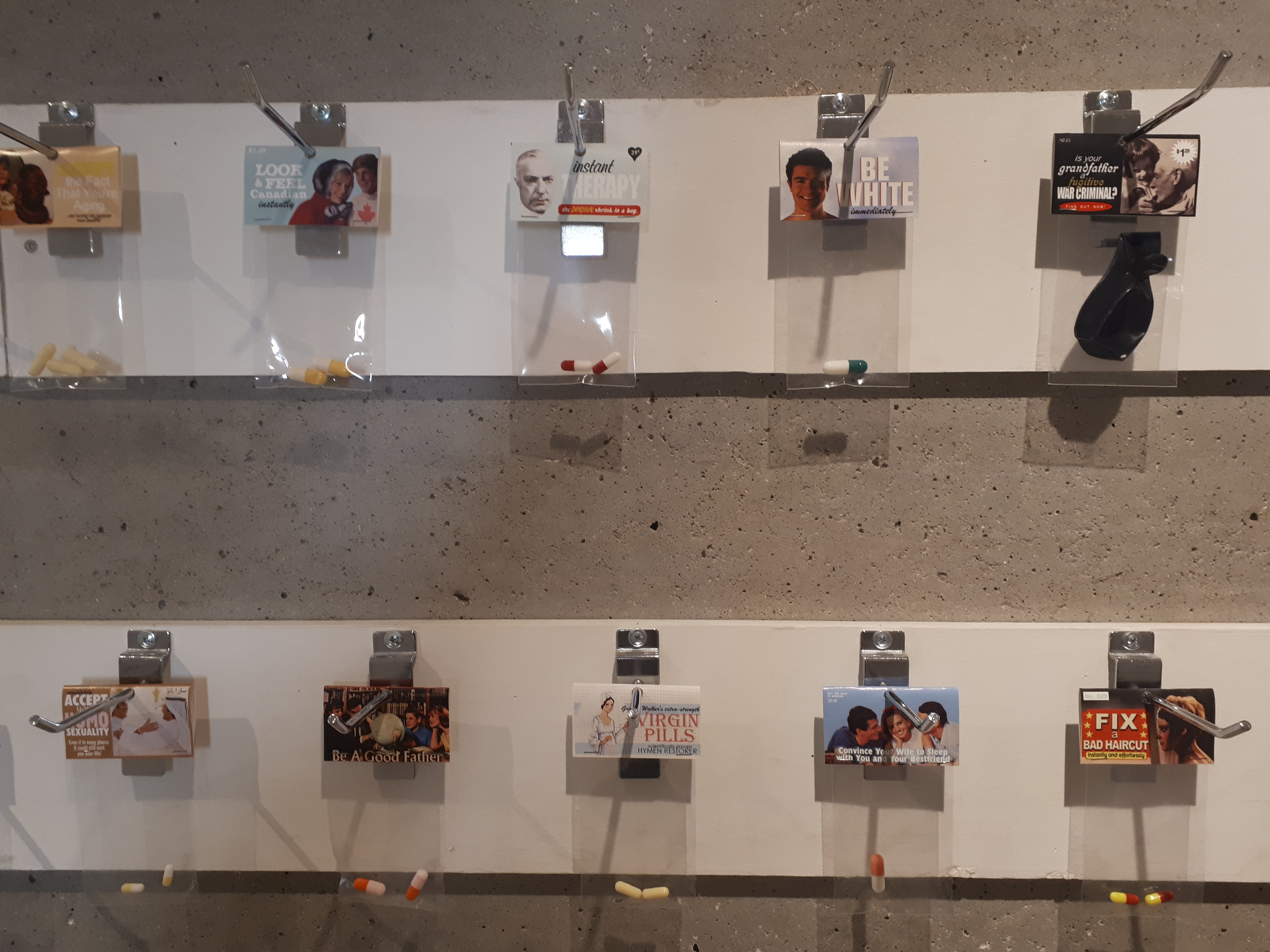

== Collections ==
Dana Wyse has works on permanent display at the Museum of Contemporary Art, the New Museum of Contemporary Art, Les Abattoirs, the Museum of Modern Art de la Ville de Paris, the Palais de Tokyo, and the Château de Montsoreau-Museum of Contemporary Art.

== Publications ==
- Vogel, Aynsley and Wyse, Dana: Vancouver: A History in Photographs. Canmore: Altitude Publishing 1997. ISBN 978-1-55153-076-5
- Lebovici, Elisabeth, Obrist, Hans Ulrich, Wyse, Dana: How to Turn Your Addiction to Prescription Drugs into a Successful Art Career. Paris: Editions du Regard 2007. ISBN 978-2-841051991

== Sources ==
- Global Feminisms: New Directions in Contemporary Art, eds. Maura Reilly and Linda Nochlin, Merrell, 2007. ISBN 978-1-85894-390-9
- Femmes artistes/artistes femmes : Paris, de 1880 à nos jours, Catherine Gonnard and Elisabth Lebovici, Hazan, 2007. ISBN 978-2-7541-0206-3
- Dana Wyse: Jesus Had A Sister Productions 1996–2001, Elisabeth Lebovici, 2001.
