= Dana Telem =

American surgeon

Dana Alexa Telem is an American surgeon.

Telem earned a Bachelor of Arts at the University of Pennsylvania, a master's of public health degree at Columbia University Mailman School of Public Health, and a medical degree at Jefferson Medical College. She received further training at Mount Sinai Medical Center and Massachusetts General Hospital. Telem is the Lazar J. Greenfield M. D. Professor of Surgery at Michigan Medicine, and specializes in minimally invasive surgery for hernia repairs, obesity and esophageal diseases. She is also the president of the Society of American Gastrointestinal and Endoscopic Surgeons. Dr. Telem is in a research group that specifically strives to close the gaps between sustainable change in surgeon behavior.
