= Dana Lewis =

Dana Lewis may refer to:

- Dana Lewis (basketball) (born 1949), American basketball player
- Dana Lewis (broadcaster), Canadian broadcaster
