= Dana Jeri Maier =

American artist and cartoonist (born 1982)

Dana Jeri Maier (born September 27, 1982) is an American artist, cartoonist, and author. She is the author of Skip to the Fun Parts: Cartoons and Complaints About the Creative Process.

Maier has been a contributor to The New Yorker Daily Shouts since 2018. Her online cartoon series The Worried Well was syndicated by Andrews McMeel Universal in 2016. Maier cites Richard Thompson, Shel Silverstien and Saul Steinberg as influences.

Maier is also known for her wheatpasting and murals throughout Washington, DC, most notably her mural depicting a bookshelf that is often used for selfies at the Politics and Prose Union Market location.

== Early life ==
Maier was born in Arlington, Virginia, and grew up in Falls Church, Virginia. She received both a BA and MA from the Maryland Institute College of Art in Baltimore, Maryland.

Maier lives with her husband in Washington, DC.

== Selected works ==
Skip to the Fun Parts: Cartoons and Complaints About the Creative Process
