= Dana Grecov =

Romanian and Canadian rheologist

Dana Grecov is a Romanian and Canadian rheologist who applies computational fluid dynamics to study the behavior of complex fluids, including biofluids and liquid crystals. She is a professor in the Department of Mechanical Engineering at the University of British Columbia.

Grecov studied engineering as an undergraduate at the Politehnica University of Bucharest. She continued her studies in fluid mechanics in France, at the Grenoble Institute of Technology, where she completed her Ph.D. She came to Canada as a postdoctoral researcher at McGill University, and became a faculty member at the University of British Columbia in 2005.

Grecov became a Fellow of Engineers Canada in 2019, and of the Canadian Society for Mechanical Engineering in 2023. She was named as an ASME Fellow in 2026.
