= Dana Hoey =

American visual artist and photographer

- Born: 1966 (age 59–60); Marin County, California
- Education: Wesleyan University(B.A.); Yale University(M.F.A.)
- Occupations: Visual artist Photographer
- Website: danahoey.com

Dana Hoey (born 1966 in Marin County, California) is a visual artist working with photography, using "the camera to reveal the inner life of women, especially young women." Her photographs are often ambiguous and have multiple meanings.

== Education ==
Hoey holds a B.A. from Wesleyan University (1989) and an M.F.A. from Yale University (1997).

== Career ==
In 1999, in an exhibition entitled Phoenix she showed a series of seventeen black-and-white photo-prints and one forty-one-foot-long digital billboard image; writing in Frieze, Vince Aletti said, "the exhibition is a mystery that bristles with clues but is ultimately unsolved; perhaps it is unsolvable." In her introduction to the catalog for Hoey's 2012 exhibit, The Phantom Sex, at the University Art Museum, University at Albany, curator Corinna Ripps Schaming wrote, "Using both staged and directed photography, her meticulously constructed pictures speak to her deep knowledge of the art and its ability to conflate fact and fiction. Her seemingly spontaneous pictures are choreographed through simple directives and are subject to her ruthless editorial eye, which is always attuned to bringing social dynamics to the fore."

She is represented by the Petzel Gallery in New York. In the biographical information about Hoey on the gallery website, they write, "The artist’s work examines contemporary female identity through staged and directed photographs and videos, which set off “peculiarly allusive narrative sparks” by echoing familiar photographic and filmic conventions. At the beginning of her career, Hoey photographed her friends, but her oeuvre has since widened to portray women of all ages in various scenarios. Pushing the photographic and video medium’s tendency to blur the line between fact and fiction, interior and exterior appearance, Hoey interrogates the social roles that women play."

Her work has been exhibited in the U.S., Germany, Switzerland, and London, England. Hoey's most notable solo exhibitions have been at the Tache Levy Gallery in Belgium and the Hirshhorn Museum and Sculpture Garden, Smithsonian Institution, in Washington, D.C. Her work is included in collections at the Hirshhorn Museum and Sculpture Garden; the Los Angeles Museum of Contemporary Art, CA; the Middlebury College Museum of Art, VT; the National Museum of Women in the Arts, D.C.; the San Francisco Museum of Modern Art, CA; and the Solomon R. Guggenheim Museum, NY.

Hoey teaches at Bard College Milton Avery Graduate School of the Arts and Columbia University.

== Solo exhibitions to 2017 ==
- 1997: Dana Hoey. Friedrich Petzel Gallery, New York.
- 1999: Phoenix. Friedrich Petzel Gallery, New York.
- 2000: Dana Hoey. Hirshhorn Museum and Sculpture Garden, Washington, D.C.
- 2001: Dana Hoey. Tache-Levy, Brussels, Belgium.
- 2002: Moon Bitches. Friedrich Petzel Gallery, New York.
- 2006: Pattern Recognition. Friedrich Petzel Gallery, New York.
- 2008: Experiments in Primitive Living. Friedrich Petzel Gallery, New York.
- 2010: Dana Hoey: Experiments in Primitive Living. Center for Art, Design and Visual Culture, University of Maryland Baltimore County, Baltimore.
- 2012: Dana Hoey: The Phantom Sex. University Art Museum, University at Albany, State University of New York, Albany.
- 2013: The Phantom Sex. Friedrich Petzel Gallery, New York.
- 2014: Love Your Enemy. Albany Institute of History & Art, Albany, New York.
- 2016: Dana Hoey & Em Rooney. Raising Cattle Gallery Montreal.
- 2017: Dana Hoey: Five Rings. Museum of Contemporary Art, Detroit, Michigan.

== Books ==
- Hoey, Dana, and Rubin, Gretchen. Profane waste. New York, N.Y.: Gregory R. Miller & Co., 2006
- Berger, Maurice, and Hoey, Dana. Dana Hoey: experiments in primitive living. Baltimore, Md.: Center for Art, Design and Visual Culture, 2010
- Hoey, Dana. Dana Hoey: the phantom sex : October 5-December 8, 2012, University Art Museum, University at Albany, State University of New York. [Albany]: University Art Museum, University at Albany, State University of New York, 2012
