= Dana Humby =

New Zealand footballer

Dana Humby!
Personal information
- Full name: Dana Humby
- Date of birth: 4 October 1979 (age 47)

International career
Years	Team	Apps	(Gls)
2004	New Zealand	2	(0)

Dana Humby (born 4 October 1979) is a former association football player who represented New Zealand at international level.

Humby made her Football Ferns début in a 0–5 loss to United States on 3 October 2004, and made just one further appearance, in a 0–6 loss, also against United States on 10 October that same year.
