= Dana Weiss =

Israeli journalist

- דנה ויס
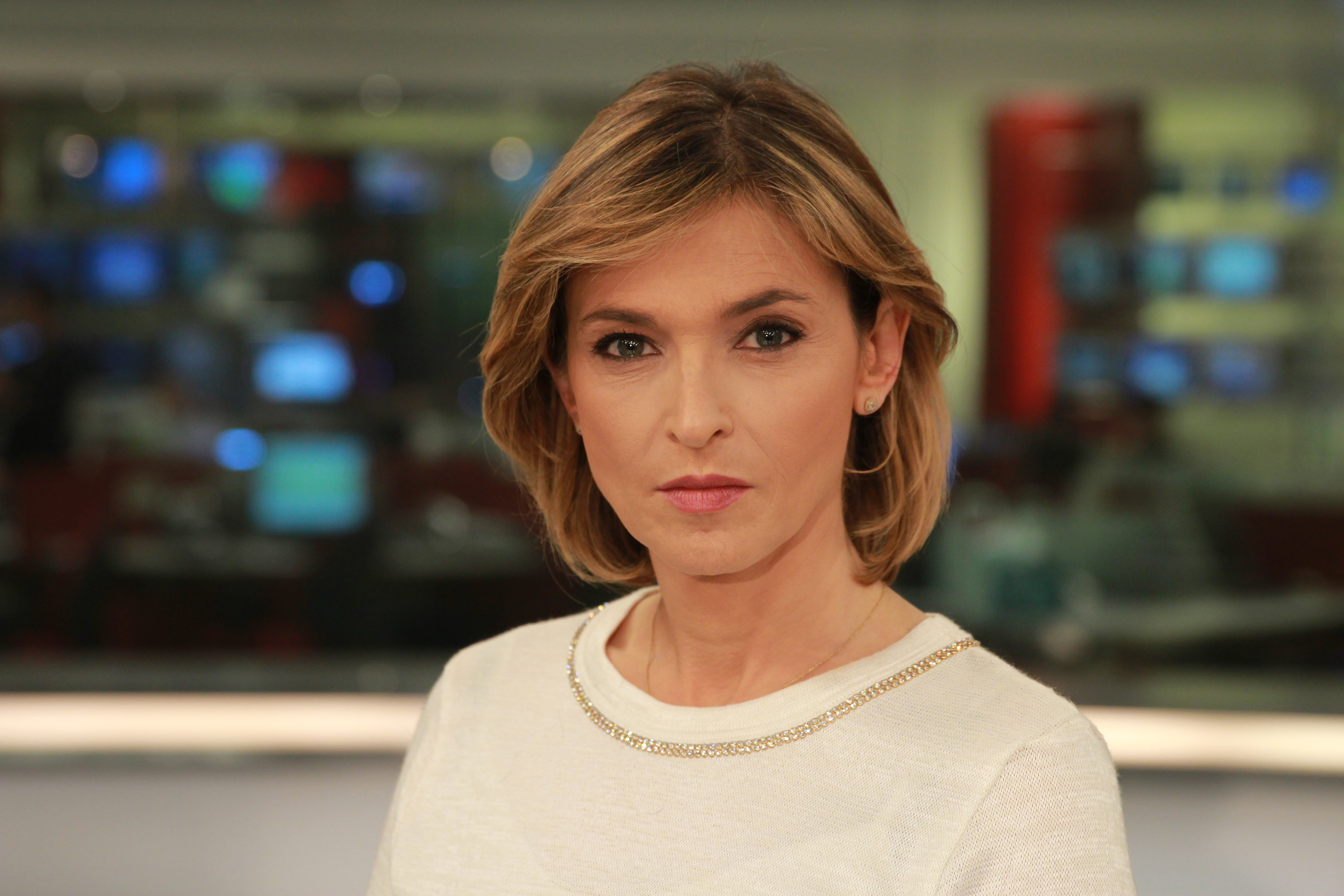
- Born: 4 May 1969 (age 56); Jerusalem, Israel
- Education: Hebrew University of Jerusalem School of Law, Communications; Tel Aviv University School of Law
- Occupations: Journalist, anchorwoman, and attorney
- Title: Chief Political Analyst, on the Israeli Channel 12
- Spouse: Rafi Topaz
- Children: 3

Dana Weiss (Hebrew: דנה ויס; born 4 May 1969) is an Israeli journalist, anchorwoman and attorney. The host of Saturday night news and the political and diplomatic correspondent for the Israeli Channel 12, she was previously moderator of Meet the Press on the Israeli Channel 2.

== Early life and education ==
Weiss was born and raised in Jerusalem. After serving in the Israel Defense Forces as an officer in the Education Corps, in 1995 she completed her LL.B. and B.A. in communications at the Hebrew University of Jerusalem and in 1996 was certified as an attorney. In 2001 Weiss earned her LL.M. at Tel Aviv University.

== Career ==
=== Journalism ===
Weiss started her journalistic career as a reporter and editor at Hadashot ("News"). After the paper closed in 1993, she started working as the legal affairs correspondent and commentator for the Israeli Channel 2 news station. She remained in this job for almost a decade, and from 2002 has hosted a variety of news shows and investigative programs, including the six o'clock daily show, the bottom line and the Cabinet with Dana Weiss.

Between 1996 and 1997 Weiss was a contributing correspondent to CNN International's News Edition.

In 2009 Weiss became the moderator of Israel's Meet the Press. In May 2013 she was named weekend news anchor, and has hosted Israel's most viewed TV news broadcast since. Weiss has also hosted the weekday evening news and other shows, and is currently the station's chief political analyst.

Weiss has participated in numerous forums and debates, including the Saban Forum at the Brookings Institution, the Israeli-American Council, The Jerusalem Post Conference and others.

=== Notable stories and interviews ===
Over the years Weiss interviewed every Israeli prime minister from Yitzhak Rabin through Benjamin Netanyahu, Israeli presidents, US President Bill Clinton, UN Secretary General Kofi Annan, and other senior leaders from around the world.

On November 28, 2017, Weiss broke the news about President Donald Trump's decision to move the US Embassy from Tel Aviv to Jerusalem. This came one week before the United States recognition of Jerusalem as capital of Israel.

In June 2019, the Trump administration refused to grant Weiss access to the economic summit it held in Bahrain. As a result, Israel's largest TV station refused to send a journalist to cover the event.

In July 2019 Israeli Minister of Education Rabbi Rafael (Rafi) Peretz told Weiss in a televised interview he was open to 'conversion therapy' for members of the LGBTQ community, causing a public uproar in Israel and around the world.

=== Documentaries ===
Weiss has presented and directed a number of TV documentaries, many dealing with issues of health ("Anti-Antibiotics" and "Anti Virus"), privacy ("Someone is Watching You") and modern society ("ADHD - a Disordered Society).

=== Teaching ===
Between 2006 and 2008 Weiss taught at the Sammy Ofer School of Communication at the Herzliya Interdisciplinary Center (IDC).

== Personal life ==
Weiss lives with her husband in Tel Aviv with their three sons.
