= Dana Murray (politician) =

American politician

Dana L. Murray (born January 18, 1946) is a former American Democratic politician who served in the Missouri House of Representatives.

Born in Harrisburg, Illinois, she graduated from Normandy High School in 1964.
