= Dana Hamilton =

American musician

- Born: November 17, 1950 (age 75); Arlington, Texas, U.S.
- Genres: Folk, country
- Occupation: Musician
- Instruments: Hammered dulcimer, mountain dulcimer, autoharp

Dana Hamilton (born November 17, 1950, in Arlington, Texas) is an American hammered dulcimer player.

Hamilton won first place in the 1980 and 1989 Walnut Valley National Hammered Dulcimer Championships held in Winfield, Kansas. He is the first two-time national champion in the history of this competition. He also won the 1995 National Mountain Dulcimer Championship and recently won 3rd in 2022 and 2nd in 2023. He was a top five finalist in the International Autoharp Contest on several occasions. He often performs with the Sweet Song String Band, Latigo Crossing, the Lone Star String Band and has been a member of Michael Martin Murphey's Rio Grande Band for several years.

== Discography ==
- Cold Frosty Morn with the Sweet Song String Band
- One Hot Texas Night with the Sweet Song String Band
- Barn Dance with the Sweet Song String Band
- The New Dallas String Band with the New Dallas String Band
- Blackbottom Strut Dana Hamilton and friends
- Loose Change with Loose Change
- Loose Change: A Collection of Traditional Instrumentals with Loose Change
- No Audible Dialog with Shawn Tutt
