= Dana McKeon =

- Born: 13 June 1989 (age 35); Naxxar, Malta
- Genres: Beatboxing; Pop
- Years active: 2012-present
- Website: www.danamckeon.com

Dana McKeon is a Maltese beatboxer and singer-songwriter who has competed in several international competitions, including the Beatbox Battle World Championships and the UK Beatbox Championships. She was the first female Maltese beatboxer to perform at the international level and her music has been featured in several Netflix series.

== Career ==
=== Early life and moving to London ===
McKeon was born on 13 June 1989 in Naxxar, Malta. In 2008, the 19 year-old McKeon was playing for Malta's junior national basketball team, when she injured her hand. While recovering in her home, she began mimicking the beat of songs using her mouth. After she showed this skill to her friends, they told her that the skill is called beatboxing.

McKeon was studying physiotherapy at the University of Malta, where she won a singing competition. Following her graduation, she moved to London in 2012, to focus on her music. Within her first four weeks in London, she performed at over 20 gigs, which attracted the attention of several talent scouts.

=== 2012 Beatbox Battle World Championships ===
McKeon represented Malta at the 2012 Beatbox Battle World Championships in Berlin, making her the first female Maltese beatboxer to perform at the international level. In the competition, she placed fifth in the women's category.

=== 2012 UK Beatbox Championships ===
McKeon participated in the 2012 UK Beatbox Championships, where she placed second in the women's category. Furthermore, she was asked to perform at the 2012 Duke of Edinburgh Awards, where she met Prince Edward.

=== 2023 Beatbox World Championships ===
McKeon was one of the hosts of the 2023 Beatbox World Championships in Berlin. Regarding her role as a host, she commented:

“It’s an honour to host, because these people are the top of the top, people who have dedicated their lives to mastering vocal percussion.”

== Personal life ==
McKeon met her husband in London, when she was hosting weekly music nights at a club. She noticed a man who kept coming every week, remarking “He just kept showing up and I realised he wasn’t coming for the music anymore.”

== Discography ==
=== Singles ===
Year	Title
2014	Street Art
2014	I Don't Want To Lose You
2018	Little Miracle of Mine
2020	Let Me Be Your Light

=== Guest artist ===
Year	Title	Featuring	Album
2020	Live Forever	Domo X	Irresistible Pop!
2020	Irresistible	Stef Tahlia	Irresistible Pop!
2020	Floating on These Waves	Stef Tahlia	Irresistible Pop!
2020	Just Tell Me	Daniel Cassar	Irresistible Pop!
2020	Take over the World	Michael Boren-Weizman and Ayda Mosharraf	Irresistible Pop!
