= Dana E. Wallace =

American biologist

Dana Edmund Wallace
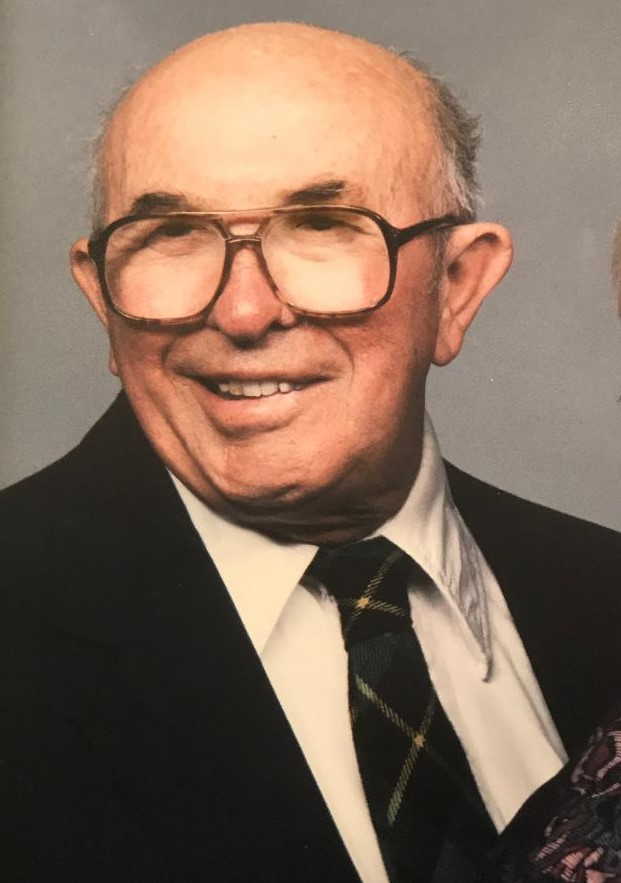
- Born: 17 October 1917; Lisbon, Maine
- Died: 19 March 2007 (aged 89); Brunswick, Maine
- Education: Bates College
- Scientific career
- Fields: Marine Biology, Aquaculture
- Workplaces: Maine Department of Marine Resources

Dana E. Wallace (1917-2007) was the assistant director of research of the Maine Department of Marine Resources from 1946 to 1983. He co-chaired the Biological Advisory Committee of the Atlantic States Marine Fisheries Commission. His work focused primarily on the aquaculture of mollusks, particularly clams and oysters, in the coastal regions of Maine.

== Early life ==
Dana Wallace was born on a small farm in Lisbon, Maine to Chester and Carrie Wallace in 1917. While attending Lisbon High School, he became an Eagle Scout, played hockey, and competed in track. He went on to study at Bates College on a track scholarship, graduating with a bachelor of arts degree in 1939.

Wallace taught math and science at Presque Isle High School and coached the local track and debate teams. During World War II, he enlisted in the United States Army Air Corps and served as a meteorologist in England for three years.

== Aquaculture and marine resources work ==
After returning from the war, Wallace undertook a brief research project for Maine's Department of Sea and Shore Fisheries, now known as the Maine Department of Marine Resources, to recommend ways to boost the value of marine fisheries to Maine's coastal communities. At the project's completion, he was hired by the department full-time. As the associate director of research at the department, Wallace led research investigations into quahog transplantation and its impact on water quality, developed new techniques to protect soft-shell clam (Mya arenaria) from predation by the invasive green crab (Carcinus maenas), and introduced the European oyster (Ostrea edulis) to Maine fisheries. He also took an active role advocating on behalf of Maine fisheries to the legislature on the state and federal levels. He retired in 1983, but continued his work on a volunteer basis through The Friends of Casco Bay for several years.

== Commemoration and later years ==
In 1990, Wallace was selected as Conservationist of the Year by the Audubon Society of Maine. The next year, the Dana E. Wallace Education Center was opened as part of the Beals Island Regional Shellfish Hatchery. In addition, Mr. Wallace was the first recipient of the Longard Gulf of Maine Award for volunteerism presented by the governor in 1999.

In his retirement, Wallace worked as ski patrol and then as a ski instructor at Sugarloaf Mountain well into his eighties. He also maintained sections of the Appalachian Trail and co-authored a guide to the Maine section.

Wallace died in Brunswick, Maine in 2007 of complications relating to kidney disease.
