= Dana Shugar =

American academic

Dana Renee Shugar (1961–2000) was an associate professor of English and Women's Studies at the University of Rhode Island, while also contributing to issues in feminism during her lifetime. She died of cancer in January 2000 at age 38. Shugar received her bachelor's degree in biology and English in 1983 from Augustana College (Illinois) and then her master's degree in 1988 and her Ph.D. in English in 1991 from the University of Iowa. At the University of Rhode Island, Shugar became the first department head of the women's studies major.

Besides being a professor, Shugar was an author and advocate for feminism. She contributed to numerous feminist and lesbian journals. She released her first book, Separatism and Women's Community, in May 1995. It focused on feminist and lesbian separatism, which were changes that were happening to women's lives across the nation. The book was nominated that year for the American Library Association's Gay, Lesbian and Bisexual Book Award. According to WorldCat, the book is held in 334 libraries.

She was working on a second book involving her experience with breast cancer, but never finished it. In honor of her accomplishments and contributions, the University of Rhode Island has a scholarship in her name. The university also holds an annual colloquium on women's studies in her name that brings up seminars on numerous feminism issues and topics.
