= Dana H. Born =

US Air Force general

Brigadier General Dana H. Born
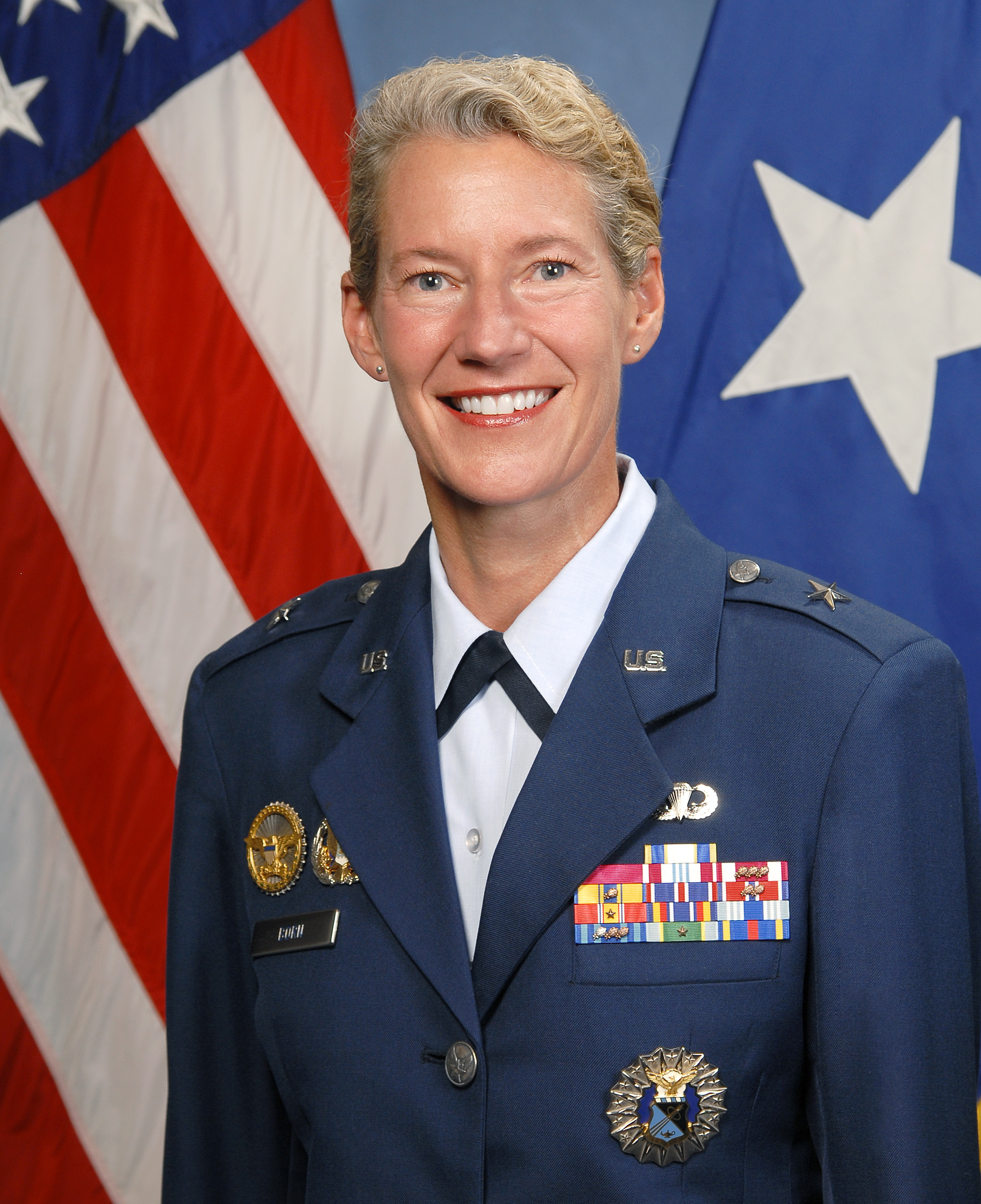
- Born: 1960 (age 65–66)
- Military career
- Allegiance: United States
- Branch: United States Air Force
- Service years: 1983–2013 (30 years)
- Rank: Brigadier general
- Awards: See below

Dana H. Born (born 1961) is a lecturer in public policy at the Harvard Kennedy School of Government, a retired brigadier general in the United States Air Force, and was the Dean of the Faculty at the United States Air Force Academy in Colorado Springs, Colorado. She is the first woman to have held that position.

== Military career ==
General Born is a distinguished graduate of the United States Air Force Academy in 1983 with a degree in behavioral sciences. She holds a Master of Science degree in experimental psychology from Trinity University in San Antonio, Texas, a Master of Arts degree in research psychology from the University of Melbourne, Australia, and a Doctor of Philosophy degree in industrial and organizational psychology from Pennsylvania State University.

Brig. Gen. Dana H. Born was dean of the faculty, United States Air Force Academy, Colorado Springs, Colorado. She commanded the 700-member Dean of the Faculty mission element and oversaw the annual design and instruction of more than 500 undergraduate courses for 4,000 cadets in 32 academic disciplines. She also directed the operation of five support staff agencies and faculty resources involving more than $250 million.

Following her tours as an exchange officer with the Royal Australian Air Force and assistant professor at the United States Air Force Academy, she completed her Doctor of Philosophy degree in industrial and organizational psychology from Pennsylvania State University. General Born's staff assignments include assistant director for recruiting research and analysis in the Office of Assistant Secretary of Defense for Force Management Policy, aide to the Secretary of the Air Force and Deputy Chief of the Personnel Issues Team in the Office of the Deputy Chief of Staff for Personnel. She commanded the 11th Mission Support Squadron at Bolling AFB, Washington, D.C., providing personnel, education and training, and family support to service members in the National Capital Region and around the world. Prior to her current assignment, the general was a permanent professor and head of the United States Air Force Academy's Behavioral Sciences and Leadership Department.

== Controversies ==
In an interview with Colorado Springs Independent reporter Pam Zubeck on December 16, 2010, Born stated that "All the instructors we have, have graduate degrees in the areas they're teaching or a related field." In concluding a year-long investigation of United States Air Force Academy faculty credentials, the Air Force Inspector General stated in a letter dated, February 10, 2012, that "Brig. Gen. Born was negligent in making an absolute statement to a local newspaper regarding the military faculty's specific academic credentials as they related to teaching disciplines without first confirming the accuracy of the supporting data." Or in other words, her statement was factual but that she had not researched each individual instructor's credentials before responding to the question. On February 17, 2012, the Pentagon released a statement: "Commanders are given broad latitude to administer punishment appropriate with the offense. United States Air Force Academy [Superintendent] Lt Gen Gould has reviewed the [Air Force Inspector General] report and will be the officer who decides what, if any, command action will be taken." In a letter from the SAF/IGS to USAFA faculty member, Professor David Mullin, dated Feb 10, 2012, it stated, "...our investigative work found no evidence supporting any allegation or claim that the USAFA faculty is not 'qualified' to teach at USAFA.... The HLC accreditation report found USAFA's faculty to be fully qualified to teach an undergraduate curriculum that results in the awarding of bachelor's degrees. We found no evidence to dispute that conclusion..."

Born was deposed on December 9, 2011, as a respondent in an Equal Employment Opportunity Commission case of alleged disability discrimination filed by former United States Air Force Academy economics professor David Mullin, who was also a client of the U.S. civil rights organization Military Religious Freedom Foundation (MRFF). During the deposition, Born was asked if she ordered a subordinate, Colonel Thomas Drohan, to conduct counter-insurgency analysis against MRFF and its clients. Under oath she denied that she did. Mullin's lead attorney, Robert Eye, wrote, on both February 1 and 29, letters to Secretary of the Air Force Michael Donley requesting with acknowledgement a formal investigation into the matter. On March 15, 2012, Eye received a response from Air Force Deputy General Counsel W. Kipling At Lee Jr. He said it would not be appropriate to comment about the status of any investigation, but "I can advise you that the allegations ... are being given appropriate consideration." On 8 June 2012, Eye received a letter from SAF/GCM, Lee stating, "The Office of the Inspector General ... has completed their inquiry in the matters addressed in your February 1, 2012 letter to the Secretary of the Air Force.... the evidence indicated that she (Born) did not direct a counterinsurgency 'Campaign' against the Military Religious Freedom Foundation. They also determined that her response, with regard to the counterinsurgency line of questioning during her December 9, 2011 deposition, was factually correct." In essence, Born was cleared of this allegation.

== Education ==
- 1983: Bachelor of Science degree in behavioral sciences, U.S. Air Force Academy, Colorado Springs, Colorado
- 1985: Master of Science degree in experimental psychology, Trinity University, San Antonio, Texas
- 1986: Squadron Officer School, Maxwell Air Force Base, Alabama
- 1991: Master of Arts degree in research psychology, University of Melbourne, Australia
- 1994: Doctor of Philosophy degree in industrial and organizational psychology, Pennsylvania State University, University Park, Pennsylvania
- 1996: Air Command and Staff College, by correspondence
- 2000: Air War College, by seminar
- 2005: Air Force Senior Leadership Course, Center for Creative Leadership, Greensboro, North Carolina
- 2006: Capstone General and Flag Officer Course, National Defense University, Fort Lesley J. McNair, Washington, D.C.
- 2007: Harvard Institute for Educational Management, Graduate School of Education, Harvard University, Cambridge, Massachusetts
- 2009: AFSO21 Executive Leadership Course, University of Tennessee College of Business, Knoxville, Tennessee

== Assignments ==
- July 1983 – May 1985, job analyst, Occupational Measurement Center, Randolph AFB, Texas
- May 1985 – February 1986, executive officer, Occupational Measurement Center, Randolph AFB, Texas
- February 1986 – May 1986, student, Squadron Officer School, Air University, Maxwell AFB, Alabama
- May 1986 – June 1989, personnel measurement psychologist, U.S. Air Force Exchange and Liaison Office, Royal Australian Air Force, Headquarters Support Command, Melbourne, Australia
- June 1989 – August 1991, assistant professor, Department of Behavioral Sciences and Leadership, U.S. Air Force Academy, Colorado Springs, Colorado
- August 1991 – June 1994, doctoral candidate and Air Force liaison officer, Pennsylvania State University
- June 1994 – June 1997, assistant director, recruiting research and analysis, Accession Policy Directorate, Office of Assistant Secretary of Defense for Force Management Policy, the Pentagon, Washington, D.C.
- June 1997 – May 1998, speechwriter and policy and issues analyst, Office of the Secretary of the Air Force, later, an aide to Secretary of the Air Force, Washington, D.C.
- May 1998 – May 2000, deputy chief of Personnel Issues Team, Office of the Deputy Chief of Staff for Personnel, Headquarters U.S. Air Force, Washington D.C.
- May 2000 – June 2002, commander, 11th Mission Support Squadron, Bolling Air Force Base, Washington D.C.
- June 2002 – September 2004, professor, later, permanent professor and Head, Department of Behavioral Sciences and Leadership, U.S. Air Force Academy, Colorado Springs, Colorado
- October 2004 – September 2013, dean of the faculty, U.S. Air Force Academy, Colorado Springs, Colorado

=== Summary of joint assignments ===
- June 1994 – June 1997, assistant director of recruiting research and analysis, Accession Policy Directorate, Office of Assistant Secretary of Defense for Force Management Policy, the Pentagon, Washington D.C., as a captain and major
- Assistant Secretary of Defense for Force Management Policy, the Pentagon, Washington D.C., as a captain and major
- March 2010 – September 2011, Department of Defense Don't Ask Don't Tell Comprehensive Review Working Group, Committee on Education and Training, as a brigadier general

== Awards and decorations ==
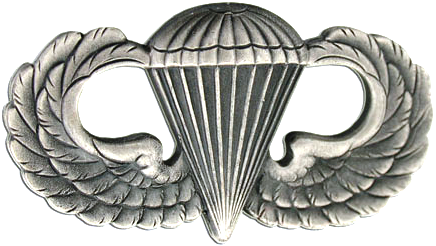
Parachutist Badge

Personal decorations
	Air Force Distinguished Service Medal
Width-44 crimson ribbon with a pair of width-2 white stripes on the edges	Legion of Merit
	Defense Meritorious Service Medal
Width-44 crimson ribbon with two width-8 white stripes at distance 4 from the edges.	Meritorious Service Medal with three bronze oak leaf clusters
	Air Force Commendation Medal with bronze oak leaf cluster
Unit awards
	Air Force Outstanding Unit Award
	Air Force Organizational Excellence Award with two bronze oak leaf clusters
Campaign and service medals
Width=44 scarlet ribbon with a central width-4 golden yellow stripe, flanked by pairs of width-1 scarlet, white, Old Glory blue, and white stripes	National Defense Service Medal with bronze service star
	Global War on Terrorism Service Medal
Service, training, and marksmanship awards
	Air Force Overseas Long Tour Service Ribbon
	Air Force Longevity Service Award with silver and bronze oak leaf clusters
	Small Arms Expert Marksmanship Ribbon with bronze service star
	Air Force Training Ribbon

Office of the Secretary of Defense Identification Badge

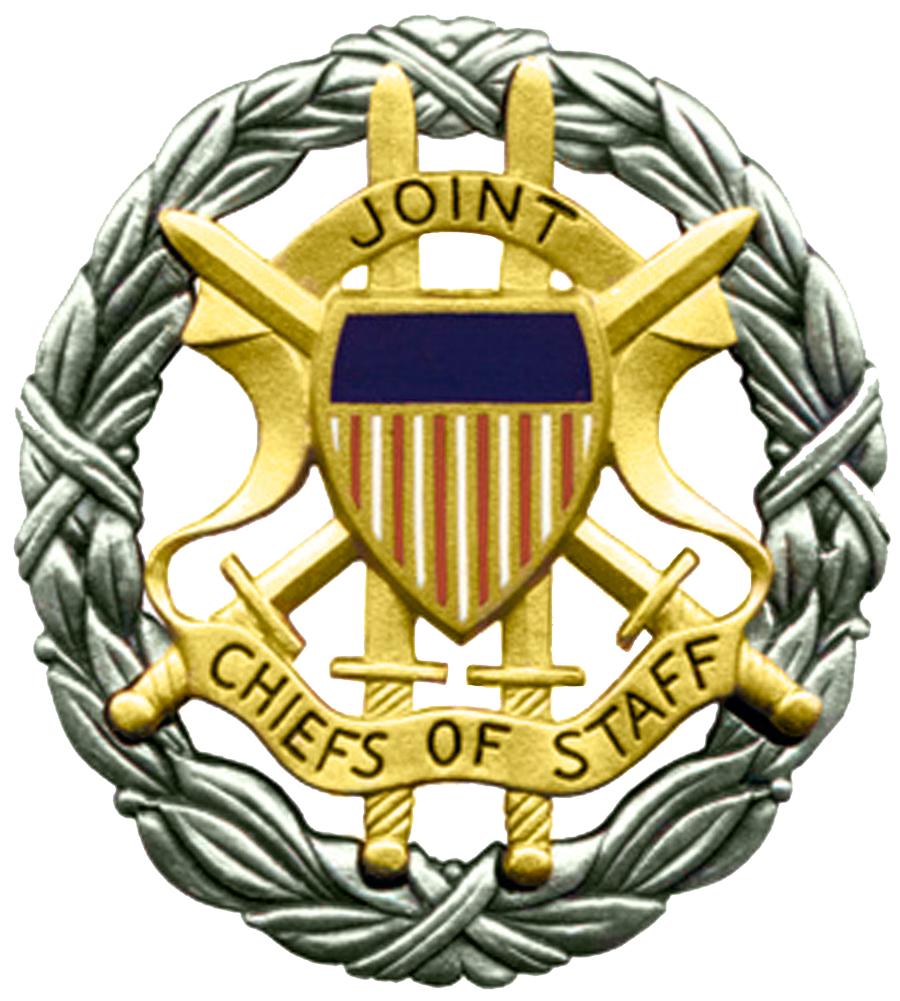
Office of the Joint Chiefs of Staff Identification Badge

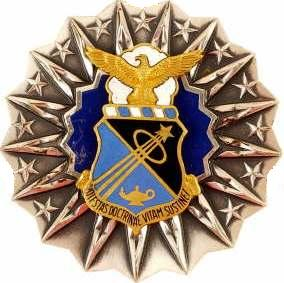
Permanent Professor Air Force Academy Badge

=== Other achievements ===
- 2007 Honorary Doctorate, Simmons College, Massachusetts
- 2009 Eugene M. Zuckert Management Award
- 2010 Hoyt S. Vandenberg Award
- 2012 Alumni Fellow Penn State University
- 2012 Active Duty Service Woman Veterans Award, American Legion Auxiliary

== Effective dates of promotion ==
Promotions
Insignia	Rank	Date
	Brigadier general	October 1, 2004
	Colonel	October 17, 2002
	Lieutenant colonel	October 1, 1999
	Major	April 1, 1995
	Captain	June 1, 1987
	First lieutenant	June 1, 1985
	Second lieutenant	June 1, 1983
