= Danna (name) =

Danna is both a given name and a surname. Notable people with the name include:

== Given name ==
- Danna Mohamed of the Maldives, Sultan of the Maldives in 1421
- Danna García (born 1978), Colombian actress
- Danna Paola (born 1995), Mexican actress and singer
- Danna Vale (born 1944), Australian politician and former member of the Australian House of Representatives

== Surname ==
- Jeff Danna (born 1964), Canadian composer and musician
- Mike Danna (born 1997), American football player
- Mychael Danna (born 1958), Canadian film composer; brother of Jeff Danna
