= Dana Elazar-HaLevi =

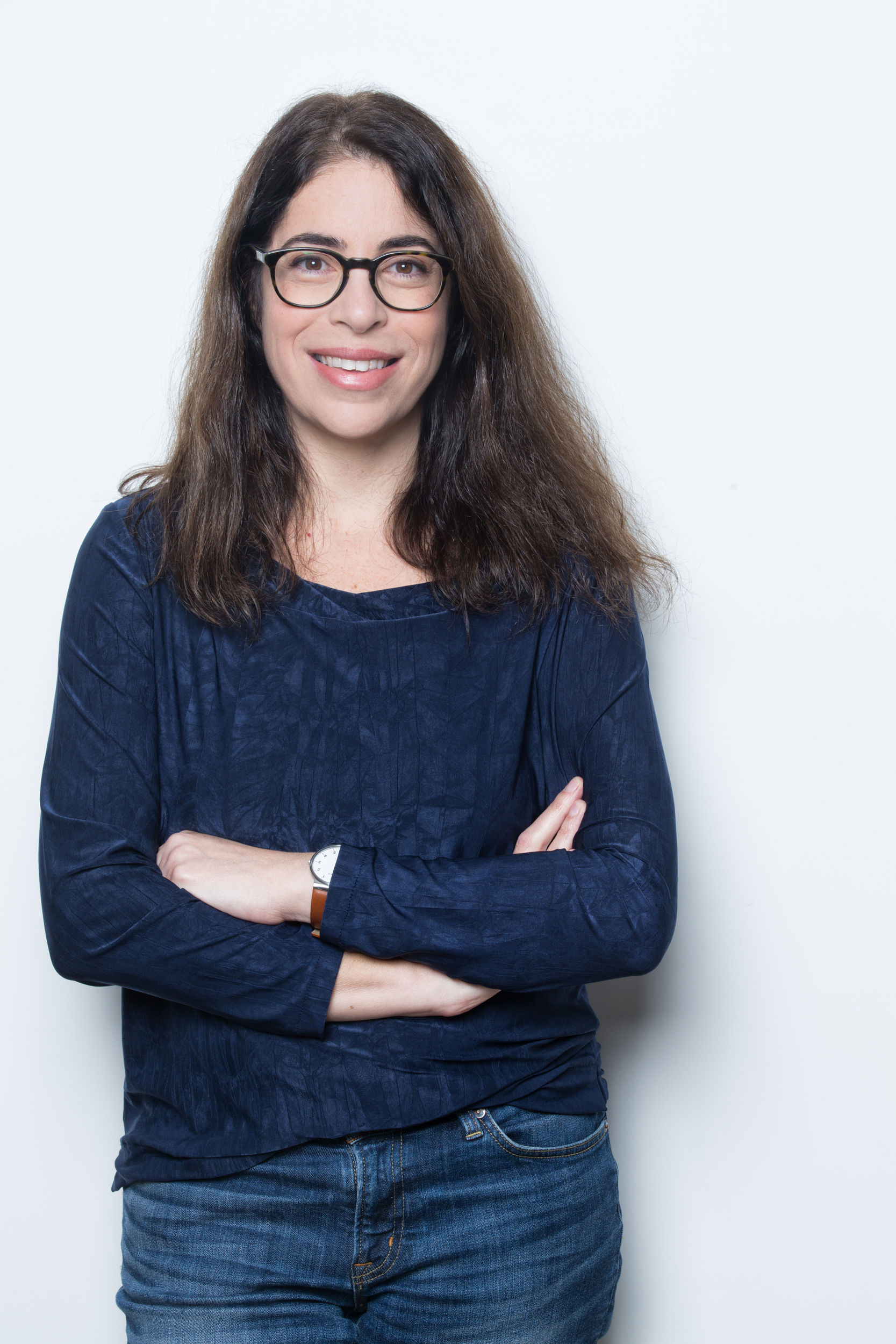
Dana Elazar-HaLevi, 2018

Dana Elazar-HaLevi (Hebrew: דנה אלעזר-הלוי; born 1970) is a children's and young adult writer, translator, and editor, known for young adult spy thriller series Secret Mission.

She she received a BA in Arabic literature and Middle Eastern studies and an MA in the history of education from Tel Aviv University. She has held various positions in major Israeli publishing houses and taught translation and editing at Tel Aviv University and Beit Berl College.

== Books ==
=== Secret Mission series ===
- Operation Manhattan

Recommended reading by the Israel Ministry of Education
2017:Publishers Association’s Gold Prize

- Operation Berlin

2016: Ha-Pinkas Award

- Operation Cairo

2017: Deborah Omer Award

- Operation Toronto
- Operation Tokyo
- Operation London
- Operation Tel Aviv

=== Truth and Justice series ===
- The Mor Affair (אמת וצדק: פרשת מור)

2024: Deborah Omer Award for best youth book

- Race Against Time, (מרוץ נגד הזמן)
