= Dana Stevens =

Dana Stevens may refer to:

- Dana Stevens (critic), movie critic at Slate magazine
- Dana Stevens (screenwriter), screenwriter and television writer/producer
- Dana Stevens (character), a fictional trans woman featured in Chris Bohjalian's novel Trans-Sister Radio

== See also ==
- Dayna Stephens
