= Dana Goldman =

American academic

Dana P. Goldman
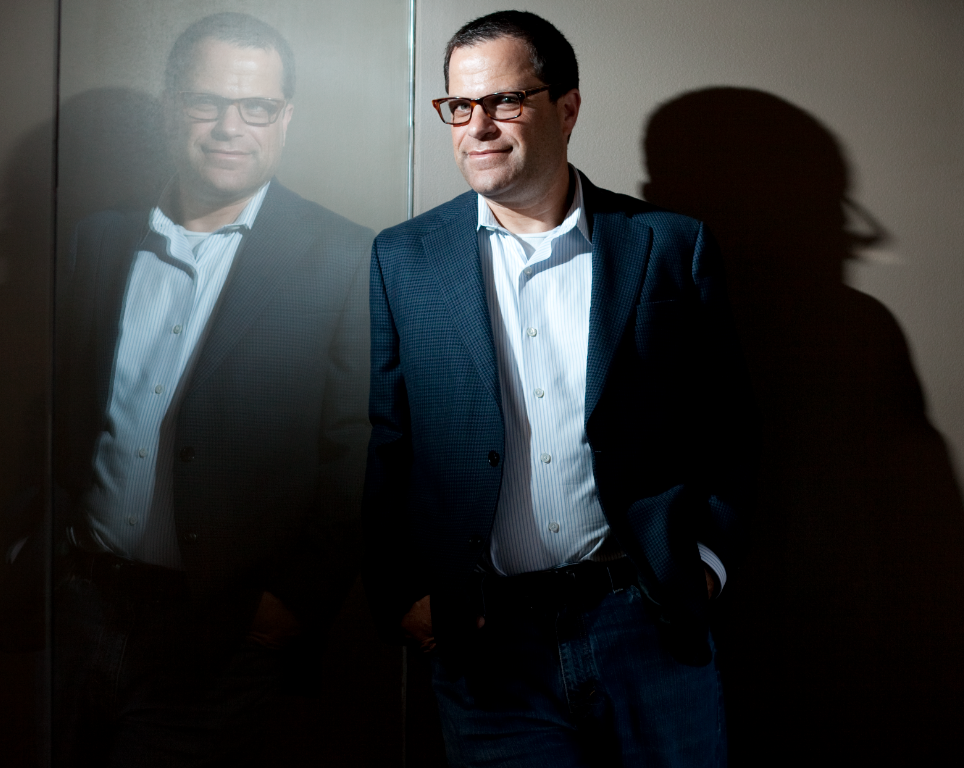
- Dana Goldman 2012
- Born: June 3, 1966 (age 60)

Academic background
- Education: Stanford University (Ph.D.)

Dana Paul Goldman is the Leonard D. Schaeffer Chair and director of the University of Southern California Leonard D. Schaeffer Center for Health Policy and Economics, and Professor of Public Policy, Pharmacy, and Economics at the Price School and USC School of Pharmacy. He is also an adjunct professor of health services and radiology at UCLA, and a managing director and founding partner, along with Darius Lakdawalla and Tomas J. Philipson, at Precision Heath Economics, a health care consulting firm. Previously held positions include the director of the Bing Center for Health Economics, RAND Royal Center for Health Policy Simulation, and UCLA/RAND Health Services Research Postdoctoral Training Program.

Goldman is also the founding co-editor of the Forum for Health Economics and Policy and has been on the editorial board of Health Affairs, B.E. Journals of Economic Analysis and Policy, and the RAND Journal of Economics, among others. He is a health policy advisor to the Congressional Budget Office and, in 2009, was elected a member of the Institute of Medicine. He is also the 2009 recipient of the Eugene Garfield Economic Impact Prize, in recognition of his outstanding research on how medical research impacts the economy.

In 2022, Goldman was elected as a fellow of the National Academy of Public Administration.

== Education ==
He received his B.A. summa cum laude from Cornell University and a Ph.D. in Economics from Stanford University.

== Use of drugs for chronic illness when co-payments are doubled ==
Data from the Centers for Disease Control and Prevention (CDC) revealed that chronic illness affected 133 million people in the United States and accounted for seven out of ten deaths. In relationship to these numbers, the American Society of Health System Pharmacists say Americans spent $307.5 billion on pharmaceuticals in 2010.

Research by Goldman, Joyce, Escarce, Pace, Soloman, Laouri, Landsman, and Teutsch (2001) studied the purchasing behavior of drugs used to treat eight chronic illnesses: diabetes, high blood pressure, high cholesterol, asthma, depression, allergies, arthritis, and stomach ulcers. This retrospective study presents a strong correlation between co-payment levels and medication use for these chronic illnesses. The study illustrated the change in consumption behaviors based on plan generosity and structure such as coinsurance rates and mandatory generic substitution.

The study by Goldman et al. (2001) predicts there would be a significant decrease in medication utilization in all of the chronic disease categories examined when co-payments were doubled. However, of note, the researchers discovered that patients respond discriminatorily to changes in co-payment and are less likely to reduce consumption of disease specific medications and will reduce pharmacy spending in other medications. Goldman, et al. (2001) exposed the largest decrease in drug spending when co-payments were doubled were in medications to treat arthritis and allergies.

The study revealed that patients with diabetes decreased their purchase of diabetes drugs the most compared to the other chronic illnesses examined when their co-payments doubled.

The research by Goldman et al. (2001) reveals two points that could inform public policy related to pharmaceutical expenditures. One, consumption of over-the-counter drugs to treat allergies and arthritis are highly influenced by out of pocket spending. Two, diabetes patients may choose lifestyle behavior changes when faced with higher drug costs.

Before changing payment structures, more research will be needed to examine adverse health consequences in the chronically ill if pharmaceutical interventions are limited by increasing out of pocket expenses. For instance, emergency department utilization could rise in response to these changes.

The results of the study by Goldman et al. (2001) could inform public policy on ways to decrease excess drug usage when the benefits are less than the cost of the drug.
