= Dana Kirk =

Dana Kirk may refer to:

- Dana Kirk (basketball) (1935–2010), American college basketball coach
- Dana Kirk (swimmer) (born 1984), American Olympic swimmer
