= Dana Telsey =

American securities analyst

- Born: 1962 (age 63–64); New York City
- Education: Hobart-William Smith College (B.A., History and Spanish); Fordham University (M.B.A.)
- Occupation: Equity research analyst
- Known for: analyst for the retail industry

Dana Telsey (born 1962, in New York City, New York) is the CEO and chief research officer of Telsey Advisory Group. She is an American consultant and top-ranked equity research analyst covering the retail industry. Telsey has been ranked for 13 years and was the number-one ranked analyst by Institutional Investor Magazine for seven years.

== Education and early career work ==
Telsey is a 1984 graduate of Hobart-William Smith College and has an M.B.A. degree from Fordham University. Family members have worked in the fashion industry. Her grandmother worked at Bergdorf Goodman and her mother at Fred the Furrier in addition to the family bookstore on Madison Avenue.

Telsey started at Baron Capital after her mother secured a secretary's position for Telsey from a former neighbor, Ron Baron, while meeting him on the street, and asking him: "Can you give Dana a job?" Telsey was eventually promoted to vice president of the Baron Asset Fund, a mutual fund of Baron Capital. Later, she was an analyst at CJ Lawrence from 1991 to 1994.

== Bear Stearns and television career ==
Telsey previously worked at Bear Stearns from 1994 to 2006, most recently as a senior managing director. She is a frequent guest analyst on CNBC and CNN, and has been interviewed by ABC News, Wall Street Week, The Today Show, and NBC Nightly News.

Telsey founded the eponymous Telsey Advisory Group in August 2006.

== Independent analyst role ==
Telsey's firm provides primary, contextual, quantitative, and qualitative research. It offers research through company, industry, and sector specific and thematic reports. It caters to hedge funds, mutual funds, private equity firms, and private and public consumer companies. The firm also offers consulting services.

== Awards ==
- Women-Owned Business of the Year by Manhattan Chamber of Commerce
- Telsey Advisory Group was recognized in the 2009 Institutional Investor Magazine rankings of the Best Independents in three categories: #1 in Retailing/Specialty Stores, #1 in Retailing/Broadlines and Department Stores, and #2 in Apparel & Footwear.
