= Dana Fuller Ross =

Dana Fuller Ross may refer to:

- Dana Fuller Ross, pseudonym for Noel B. Gerson (1913–1988), U.S. author
- Dana Fuller Ross, pseudonym for James M. Reasoner (born 1953), U.S. author

== See also ==
- Dana Ross, Canadian actor and writer
