= Danuta =

Danuta is a Polish feminine given name. Its diminutive is Danusia.

Notable people named Danuta include:

- Danuta Bartoszek (born 1961), long-distance runner for Canada
- Danuta Bułkowska (born 1959), former Polish champion in high jumping
- Danuta Dmowska (born 1982), Polish fencer and World Épée Champion 2005
- Danuta Gleed (1946–1996), Canadian writer of Polish origin
- Danuta Hojarska (born 1960), Polish politician, member of the Sejm
- Danuta Hübner (born 1948), Polish economist, academic, and policy maker
- Danuta Jazłowiecka (born 1957), Polish politician, member of the Sejm
- Danuta Kobylińska-Walas (born 1931), Polish Sea Captain
- Danuta Kordaczuk (1939–1988), Polish Olympic volleyball player
- Danuta Kozák (born 1987), Hungarian Olympic sprint canoer
- Danuta Lato (born 1963), Polish actress, model and singer in the 1980s and 1990s
- Danuta Pietraszewska (born 1947), Polish politician, member of the Sejm
- Danuta Ptaszycka-Jackowska (1939–2025), Polish geographer and landscape architect
- Danuta Szaflarska (1915–2017), Polish screen and stage actress
- Danuta Wałęsa (born 1949), wife of former President of Poland Lech Wałęsa

== See also ==
- Danutė, the Lithuanian equivalent
