= Dayna Berghan-Whyman =

New Zealand medieval fighter

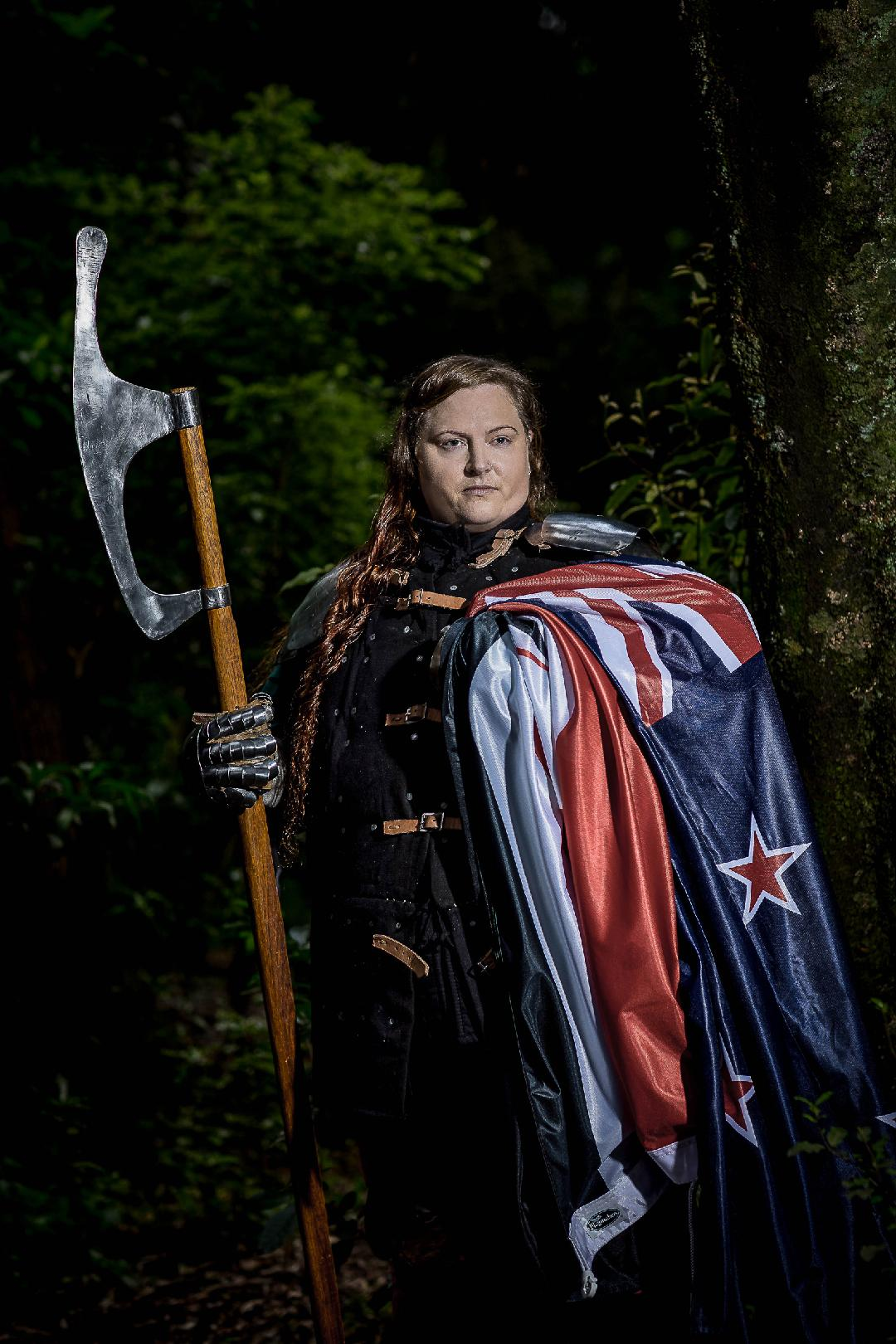
- Born: Dayna Morton; 1978 (age 47–48); Kaitaia, New Zealand
- Other names: Dayna Berghan
- Occupation: Data wrangler
- Known for: Medieval fighting

Dayna Berghan-Whyman is a medieval fighter from New Zealand. She has represented New Zealand at the International Medieval Combat Federation World Championships in 2017, 2018 and 2019.

== Medieval combat ==
Berghan-Whyman became involved in medieval combat after joining a medieval re-enactment society, having studied Old English literature at Victoria University of Wellington. She started fighting competitively in 2001.

Berghan-Whyman has represented New Zealand at the International Medieval Combat Federation World Championships in 2017, 2018 and 2019, competing in the women's poleaxe, longsword and sword and shield divisions. She placed ninth in 2017, fifth in 2018, and sixth in 2019.

She also participated in the Battle of Nations tournament near Rome in 2018, as a solo fighter and as part of a five-person melee team. While fighting in the Battle of Nations, she was briefly hospitalised with a migraine and temporary partial loss of sight. She also suffered a hand injury after using borrowed gauntlets after her own were stolen. In 2019 Berghan-Whyman fought in the Battle of Nations in Serbia.

In New Zealand, Berghan-Whyman frequently fights male opponents, as there are few women in medieval combat - in 2020 it was estimated that there were only eight female fighters in New Zealand. Berghan-Whyman qualified to represent New Zealand by fighting two male opponents at the New Zealand Full Contact Medieval Combat Pacific Cup.

As a melee fighter she takes the 'tank' position, soaking up damage and distracting opponents while more lightly-armoured teammates attempt to score hits.

Berghan-Whyman is Treasurer of the New Zealand National Historical Medieval Battle Federation.

== Career and personal life ==
Berghan-Whyman was Women's Rights Officer of the Victoria University of Wellington Students' Association in 2000, and National Women's Rights Officer of the New Zealand Union of Students' Associations in 2001.

She is married and has a daughter. She has written about her daughter's medical conditions: the rare genetic disorder Alfi's syndrome, and Asperger syndrome.
