= Dana Gluckstein =

American visual artist and photographer (born 1957)

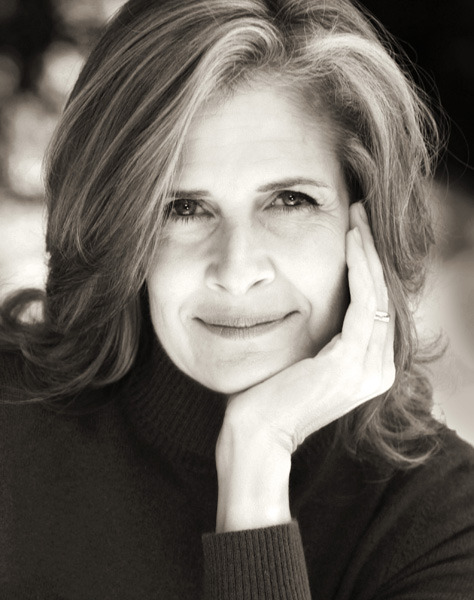
- Gluckstein in 2010
- Born: 1957 (age 68–69); Los Angeles, California, United States
- Education: Stanford University
- Known for: Photography, filmmaking, activism
- Notable work: DIGNITY: In Honor of the Rights of Indigenous Peoples
- Style: Portrait photography

Dana Gluckstein (born 1957) is an American photographer, filmmaker, and human rights advocate known for her black-and-white portraiture and for work documenting Indigenous communities around the world. Her photography book DIGNITY: In Honor of the Rights of Indigenous Peoples (2010) was published in collaboration with Amnesty International USA to mark the organization's 50th anniversary.

Gluckstein's DIGNITY: Tribes in Transition photography exhibition has been shown at institutions including the United Nations Office at Geneva, in 2011 and has toured museums in Europe and the United States where Gluckstein has spoken at openings and to the media. She has also spoken on "How Art Can Impact the State of the World" at the World Economic Forum in Davos, Switzerland in 2013 and other public events addressing art and human rights.

Gluckstein's portraits are included in the permanent collections of the Los Angeles County Museum of Art, the Santa Barbara Museum of Art, and the Smithsonian National Museum of African American History and Culture. Gluckstein resides in Los Angeles and graduated from Stanford University in 1979.

== Career ==
Gluckstein began her photography career in the early 1980s as a freelance contributor to San Francisco Magazine, where she produced portraiture of cultural figures such as Grace Slick for the weekly feature Personae. Her commercial photography work has included campaigns for clients such as Apple, Toyota, and the advertising agency Chiat/Day. While on assignment, Gluckstein traveled extensively, which inspired her to begin photographing Indigenous communities. She has photographed individuals such as Nelson Mandela, Mikhail Gorbachev, Desmond Tutu, and Muhammad Ali.

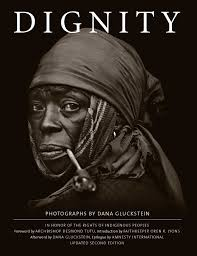
DIGNITY: In Honor of the Rights of Indigenous Peoples book cover

In 2010, Gluckstein released her book DIGNITY: In Honor of the Rights of Indigenous Peoples, in association with Amnesty International (AI) for its 50th global anniversary. AIUSA used the book as part of an action alert campaign urging President Barack Obama to support the UN Declaration on the Rights of Indigenous Peoples (UNDRIP).

In January 2011, two months after DIGNITY was published and the associated media campaign began, President Obama announced U.S. support for UNDRIP. At the exhibition opening, Gluckstein was introduced by the then-U.S. Ambassador to the U.N., Mrs. Betty King, and the then-U.N. High Commissioner for Human Rights, Mrs. Navanethem Pillay.

Gluckstein's work has focused on the worldwide movement against racial injustice. She has collaborated with Amnesty International USA (AIUSA) in support of efforts to address disproportionately higher rates of sexual violence against Native American and Alaskan Native women.

== Bibliography ==
- DIGNITY: In Honor of the Rights of Indigenous Peoples (2010) by Dana Gluckstein, Desmond Tutu (Foreword), Faithkeeper Oren R Lyons (Introduction), Amnesty International (Epilogue) – published in English and German. 144 pages, Hardcover, Published 9 November 2010 by powerHouse Books, ISBN 978-1-57687-562-9, Language English 144 pages, Hardcover, 1 October 2010, by Reich Verlag Ag, ISBN 978-3-7243-1029-7, Language German
- DIGNITY: In Honor of the Rights of Indigenous Peoples, Updated Second Edition (2020) by Dana Gluckstein, Desmond Tutu (Foreword), Faithkeeper Oren R Lyons (Introduction), Amnesty International (Epilogue). 144 pages, Hardcover, Published 1 September 2020 by powerHouse Books, ISBN 978-1-57687-922-1, Language English
- 200 Women: Who Will Change the Way You See the World, (2017) Dana Gluckstein featured in. 396 pages, Hardcover, Published 31 October 2017 by Chronicle Books, ISBN 978-1-4521-6658-2, Language English
- Mandela in America (2012) by Charlene Smith. Cover portrait and two insert images of Mandela and Ali by Dana Gluckstein. ISBN 9780864867261, Publication Year 2012, Format Hardcover, Language English, Book Title Mandela and America, Author Charlene Smith, Publisher New Africa Books, Number of Pages 142 Pages
