= Dana Protopopescu =

Romanian musician

Dana Protopopescu is a Romanian pianist settled in Belgium.

Protopopescu serves as the Queen Elisabeth Violin Competition's accompanist since 1989 and teaches at the Queen Elisabeth School of Music. She is also active as a chamber musician.

== Career ==
Dana Protopopescu was born in Bucharest and studied at the Royal Conservatoire in Brussels and the Hochschule in Hanover.

She recorded all of Mendelssohn's solo piano works in Brussels in the mid-1990s, which were released on seven discs by Koch's Discover label. These discs, as well as her recordings of two piano trios played by the Florestan Trio, have been reissued by Profil in 2008. In 1996, Protopopescu participated in the recording of Carl Maria von Weber's Piano Concertos 1+2 with Belgian Radio Philharmonic and Alexander Rahbari. American Record Guide favorable reviewed it, calling their interpretation "light and airy", "caught in fine sonics and offered at super budget price".

She recorded a 2005 version of Clara Schumann's Piano Concerto, accompanied by Romanian Radio Orchestra and released on Electrecord label. American Record Guide, in a mixed review, opined that the performances are truly exciting, commending part II played by Protopopescu and a cello player for being soulful, and praising the smooth tempo rubato of Protopopescu and Andreescu that "underlines modulations" of the part with "supreme effectiveness". However, the review ultimately concluded that poor sound quality, especially the quality of piano and strings, and subpar engineering work result in a run-of-the-mill release for the most part.
