= National Black United Fund =

The National Black United Fund (NBUF) is an African-American charity. It aims to collect funds from the black community and use it to support black development. It was founded in Delaware in 1974 and first led by Walter Bremond. It was started as an alternative to United Way and in 1980 a federal court ruled that NBUF had been illegally excluded from the Combined Federal Campaign (CFC).
