= Durak railway station =

Railway station in Turkey

DURAK

General information
- Location: İncirgediği Mah. 33400; Tarsus, Mersin; Turkey
- Coordinates: 37.1199°N 35.0020°E
- System: TCDD Taşımacılık intercity rail station
- Owner: Turkish State Railways
- Operator: TCDD Taşımacılık
- Line: Erciyes Express Taurus Express
- Platforms: 1 side platform
- Tracks: 3

Construction
- Structure type: At-grade
- Parking: Yes

History
- Opened: 27 April 1912

Services
Preceding station	TCDD Taşımacılık	Following station
Kelebek towards Kayseri	Erciyes Express	Yenice towards Adana
Kelebek towards Konya	Taurus Express	Yenice towards Adana
Location

Durak railway station (Turkish: Durak istasyonu meaning "Stop station") is a railway station in the Mersin Province of Turkey. Since the station is not near any settlement, it is used mainly as a siding. Durak station was originally opened on 27 April 1912 by the Baghdad Railway. Sitting at the base of the Taurus Mountains, the station was used as a staging point to construct the railway further through the mountains, similar to Ulukışla station. The station house was built in the Turkish Neoclassical style, similar to the Yenice station house.

The choice of a railway station at Durak (also called Dorak) was not accidental, since the site is near the junction of two very strategic ancient roads that once connected the Mediterranean Sea to the Cilician Gates. In the 12th or 13th century during the period of the Armenian Kingdom of Cilicia an impressive three-storey fortified estate house, today known as Kız, was constructed just northwest of Durak to guard these roads. Like the nearby Tece Castle the masonry and architectural features of Kız indicate that it was built by Armenian masons, perhaps for the Crusaders.

TCDD Taşımacılık operates two daily intercity trains from Konya and Kayseri to Adana.
