= Kelebek railway station =

Railway station in Turkey

KELEBEK

General information
- Location: Durak Köyü 01770; Karaisali, Adana; Turkey
- Coordinates: 37.1544°N 34.9761°E
- System: TCDD Taşımacılık intercity rail station
- Owner: Turkish State Railways
- Operator: TCDD Taşımacılık
- Line: Erciyes Express Taurus Express
- Platforms: 2 side platforms
- Tracks: 1

Construction
- Structure type: At-grade
- Parking: Yes

Services
Preceding station	TCDD Taşımacılık	Following station
Karaisali Bucağı towards Kayseri	Erciyes Express	Durak towards Adana
Karaisali Bucağı towards Konya	Taurus Express	Durak towards Adana
Location

Kelebek railway station (Turkish: Kelebek istasyonu) is a railway station in the village of Durak, Adana in Turkey. The station consists of two side platforms on both sides of a single track.

TCDD Taşımacılık operates two daily intercity trains from Konya and Kayseri to Adana.
