= Pozantı railway station =

Railway station in Turkey

POZANTI
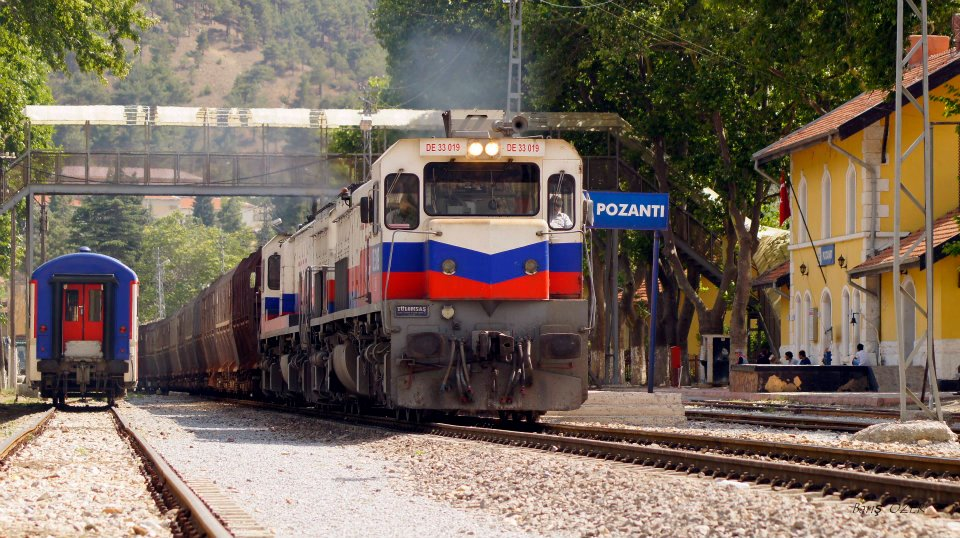
- A northbound freight train passing the station.

General information
- Location: Gençlik Cd., Cumhuriyet Mah. 01470; Pozantı, Adana; Turkey
- Coordinates: 37.4228°N 34.8729°E
- System: TCDD Taşımacılık intercity rail station
- Owner: Turkish State Railways
- Operator: TCDD Taşımacılık
- Line: Erciyes Express Taurus Express
- Platforms: 1 island platform
- Tracks: 2

Construction
- Structure type: At-grade
- Parking: Yes

History
- Opened: 21 December 1912

Services
Preceding station	TCDD Taşımacılık	Following station
Çiftehan towards Kayseri	Erciyes Express	Belemedik towards Adana
Çiftehan towards Konya	Taurus Express	Belemedik towards Adana
Location

Pozantı railway station (Turkish: Pozantı istasyonu) is a railway station in the town of Pozantı, Turkey. Situated in the Taurus Mountains, Pozantı is the northernmost station in the Adana Province. Due to its geographical location near the Cilician Gates, the station was historically a resting stop for trains crossing the mountain range. The station was originally opened on 21 December 1912 by the Baghdad Railway.

Pozantı station consists of an island platform serving two tracks, with a total of four tracks. The other two tracks are used as a siding.

TCDD Taşımacılık operates two daily intercity trains from Konya and Kayseri to Adana.

== Images ==
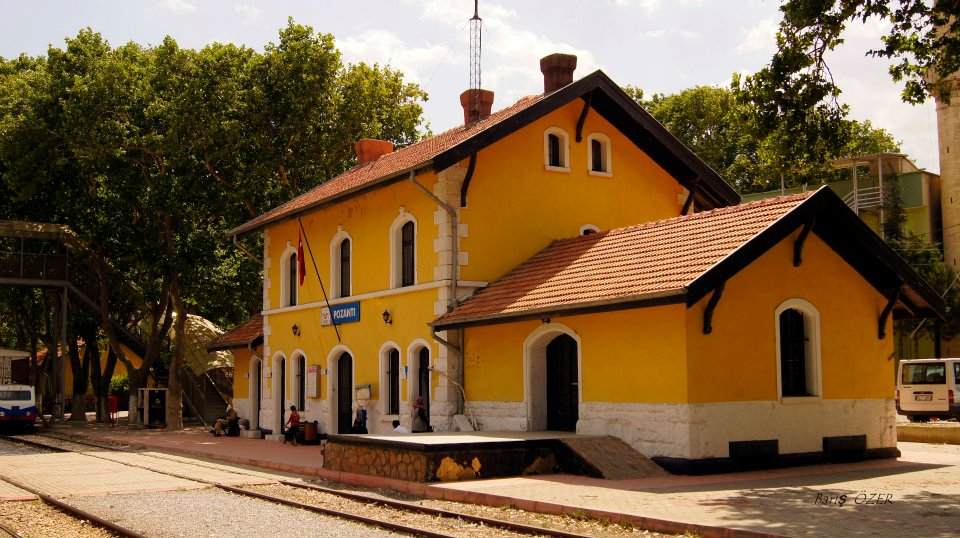
The station house.

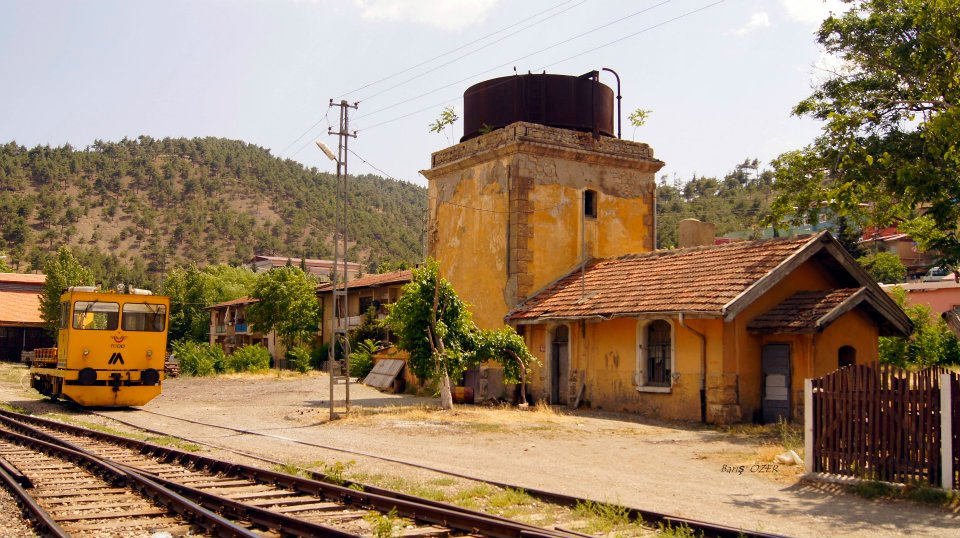
The old water tower.
