= Karaisali Bucağı railway station =

Railway station in Turkey

KARAİSALİ BUCAĞI

General information
- Location: Bucak Köyü 01770; Karaisali, Adana; Turkey
- Coordinates: 37.1914°N 34.9394°E
- System: TCDD Taşımacılık intercity rail station
- Owner: Turkish State Railways
- Operator: TCDD Taşımacılık
- Line: Erciyes Express Taurus Express
- Platforms: 1 island platform
- Tracks: 2

Construction
- Structure type: At-grade
- Parking: Yes

Services
Preceding station	TCDD Taşımacılık	Following station
Hacıkırı towards Kayseri	Erciyes Express	Kelebek towards Adana
Hacıkırı towards Konya	Taurus Express	Kelebek towards Adana
Location

Karaisali Bucağı railway station (Turkish: Karaisali Bucağı istasyonu) is a railway station in the village of Bucak, Adana in Turkey. The station consists of an island platform serving two tracks, with a third track as a siding.

TCDD Taşımacılık operates two daily intercity trains from Konya and Kayseri to Adana.
