= Hacıkırı railway station =

Railway station in Turkey

HACIKIRI
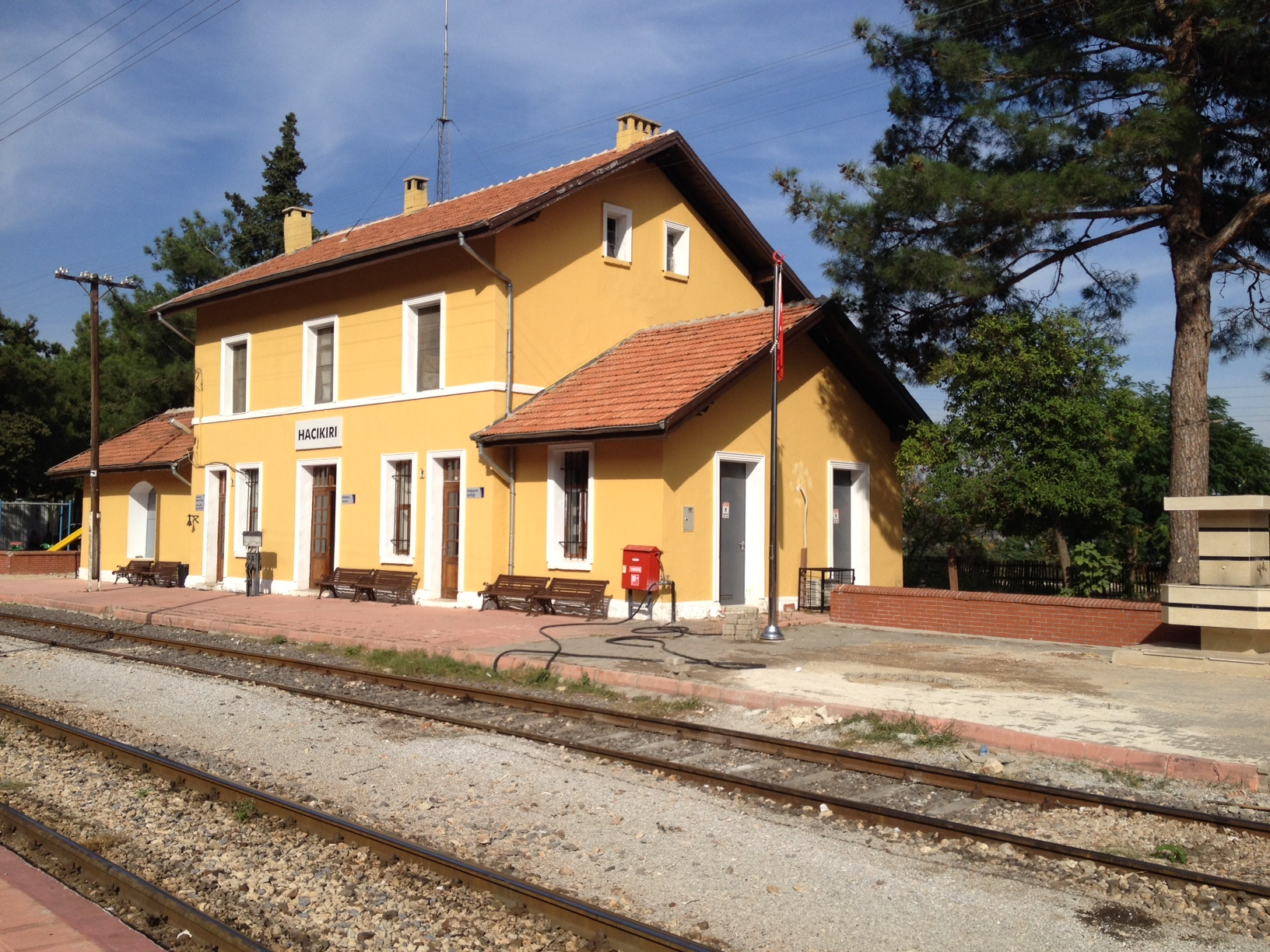
- Hacıkırı railway station

General information
- Location: Kiralan Köyü 01770; Karaisali, Adana; Turkey
- Coordinates: 37.2522°N 34.9810°E
- System: TCDD Taşımacılık intercity rail station
- Owner: Turkish State Railways
- Operator: TCDD Taşımacılık
- Line: Konya-Yenice railway
- Platforms: 1 island platform
- Tracks: 2

Construction
- Structure type: At-grade
- Parking: Yes

History
- Opened: 11 October 1918

Services
Preceding station	TCDD Taşımacılık	Following station
Belemedik towards Kayseri	Erciyes Express	Karaisali Bucağı towards Adana
Belemedik towards Konya	Taurus Express	Karaisali Bucağı towards Adana
Location

Hacıkırı railway station (Turkish: Hacıkırı istasyonu) is a railway station in the village of Kiralan, Adana in Turkey. The station is the southern entrance to the Çakıt Valley pass, where the railway traverses through 12 tunnels, the longest of them being 3.7 km (2.3 mi) long. South of the station lies the Varda Viaduct.

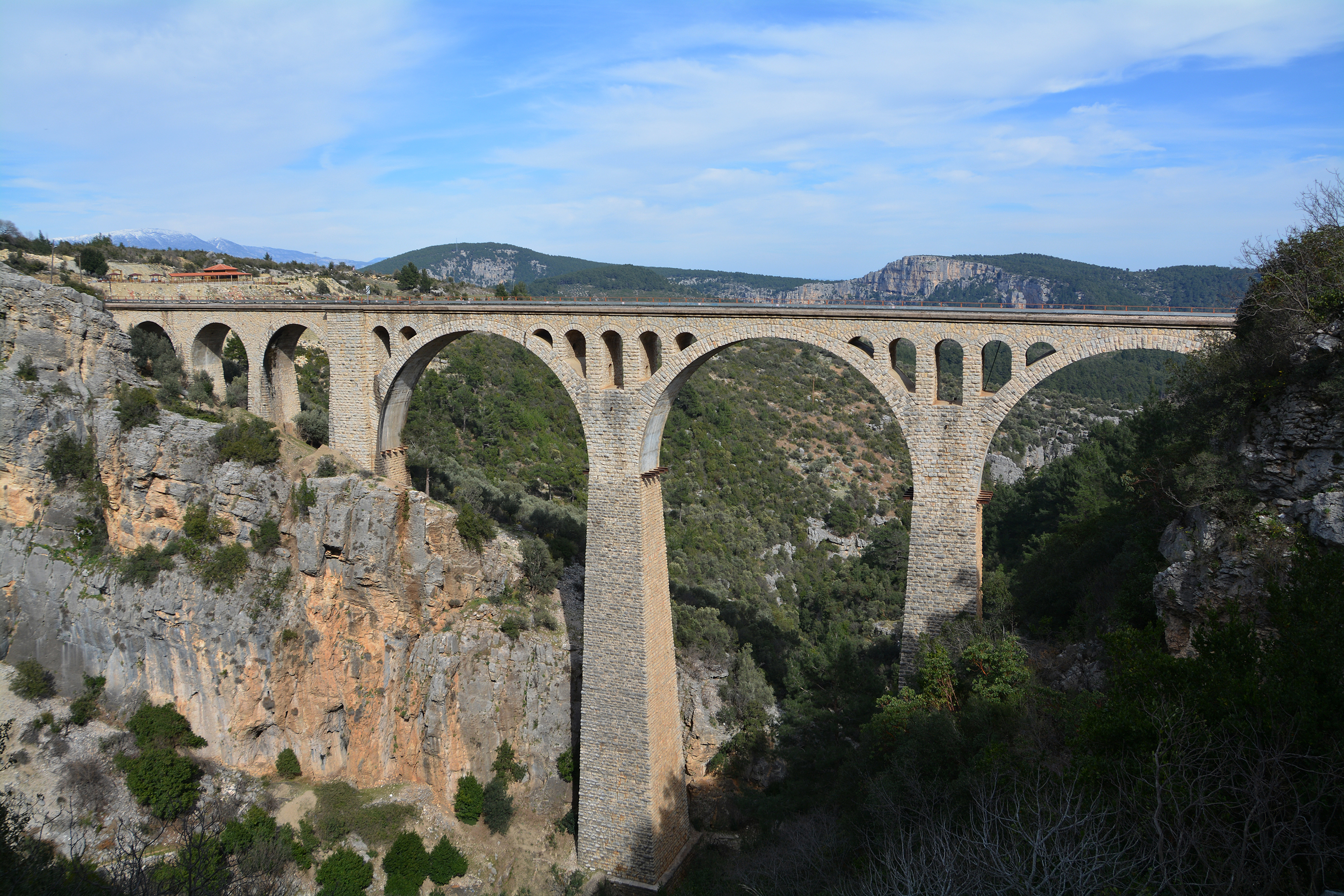
Varda Bridge next to Hacıkırı railway station

Hacıkırı station was originally constructed in 1912 by the Baghdad Railway and remained the northern terminus of the southern half of the railway (the northern half being across the Çakıt Valley). The station played an important role during World War I, where troops and material coming from the north would board trains at Hacıkırı, after traversing a 17 km (11 mi) gap in the railway. The tunnels between Hacıkırı and Belemedik were finally completed in September 1918 and the station officially opened on 9 October, 11 days before the Ottoman Empire capitulated.

Hacıkırı station consists of an island platform serving two tracks, with three more tracks used as sidings.

TCDD Taşımacılık operates two daily intercity trains from Konya and Kayseri to Adana.
