= Çiftehan railway station =

Railway station in Turkey

ÇİFTEHAN

General information
- Location: Turgut Özer Cd., Cumhuriyet Mah. 51900; Ulukışla, Niğde; Turkey
- Coordinates: 37.5115°N 34.7738°E
- System: TCDD Taşımacılık intercity rail station
- Owner: Turkish State Railways
- Operator: TCDD Taşımacılık
- Line: Erciyes Express Taurus Express
- Platforms: 1 island platform
- Tracks: 2

Construction
- Structure type: At-grade
- Parking: Yes

Services
Preceding station	TCDD Taşımacılık	Following station
Gümüş towards Kayseri	Erciyes Express	Pozantı towards Adana
Gümüş towards Konya	Taurus Express	Pozantı towards Adana
Location

Çiftehan railway station (Turkish: Çiftehan istasyonu) is a railway station in the village of Çiftehan, Niğde in Turkey. The station consists of an island platform serving two tracks, with a third track as a siding.

TCDD Taşımacılık operates two daily intercity trains from Konya and Kayseri to Adana.
