= Gümüş railway station =

Railway station near the village of Hasangazi in Turkey

GÜMÜŞ

General information
- Location: Hasangazi Köyü 51900; Ulukışla, Niğde; Turkey
- Coordinates: 37.5149°N 34.6212°E
- System: TCDD Taşımacılık intercity rail station
- Owner: Turkish State Railways
- Operator: TCDD Taşımacılık
- Line: Erciyes Express Taurus Express
- Platforms: 1 side platform
- Tracks: 1

Construction
- Structure type: At-grade
- Parking: Yes

Services
| Preceding station | TCDD Taşımacılık | Following station |
|---|---|---|
| Ulukışla towards Kayseri | Erciyes Express | Çiftehan towards Adana |
| Ulukışla towards Konya | Taurus Express | Çiftehan towards Adana |
Location

Gümüş railway station (Turkish: Gümüş istasyonu) is a railway station in near the village of Hasangazi, Niğde in Turkey. The station is located between the D.750 state highway to the north and the Çakıtsuyu creek to the south.

TCDD Taşımacılık operates two daily intercity trains from Konya and Kayseri to Adana.
