= Belemedik railway station =

Railway station in Belemedik, Adana in Turkey

BELEMEDİK
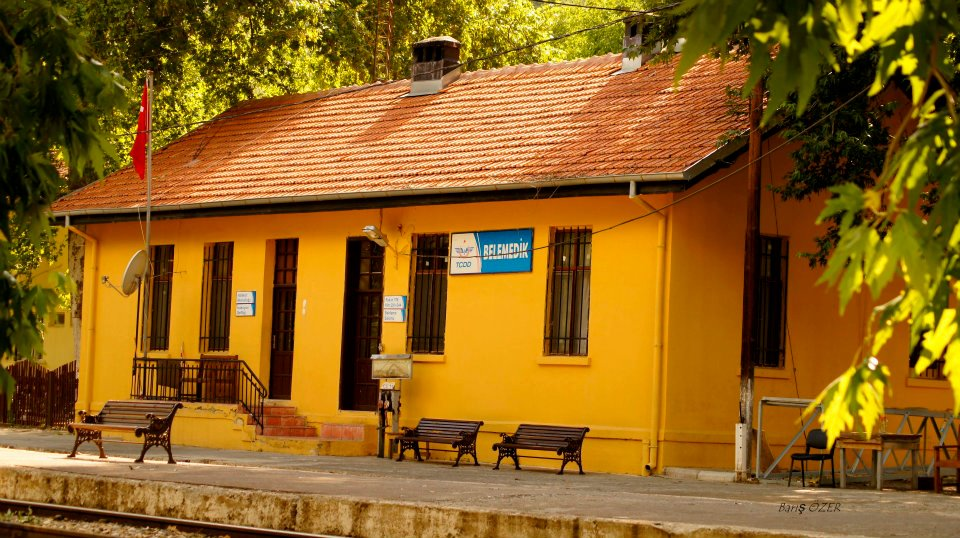
- The station house.

General information
- Location: Belemedik Köyü 01470; Pozantı, Adana; Turkey
- Coordinates: 37.3552°N 34.9104°E
- System: TCDD Taşımacılık intercity rail station
- Owner: Turkish State Railways
- Operator: TCDD Taşımacılık
- Line: Erciyes Express Taurus Express
- Platforms: 2 (1 island platform, 1 side platform)
- Tracks: 2

Construction
- Structure type: At-grade
- Parking: Yes

History
- Opened: 21 December 1912

Services
Preceding station	TCDD Taşımacılık	Following station
Pozantı towards Kayseri	Erciyes Express	Hacıkırı towards Adana
Pozantı towards Konya	Taurus Express	Hacıkırı towards Adana
Location

Belemedik railway station (Turkish: Belemedik istasyonu) is a railway station in the village of Belemedik, Adana in Turkey. The station is northern entrance to the Çakıt Valley pass, where the railway traverses through 12 tunnels, the longest of them being 3.7 km (2.3 mi) long.

Belemedik station was originally opened on 21 December 1912 by the Baghdad Railway and played an important role in transporting troops to the Mesopotamian and Palestine fronts during World War I. The station was also a gap in the railway, thus goods and soldiers disembarked at Belemedik and walked to Durak (on the other side of the valley) where the railway continued. The pass through Çakıt Valley was finally completed on 9 October 1918, 11 days before the Ottoman Empire capitulated.

Belemedik station consists of an island platform and a side platform serving two tracks, with a third track as a siding.

TCDD Taşımacılık operates two daily intercity trains from Konya and Kayseri to Adana.
