= Çakmak railway station =

Railway station in Turkey

ÇAKMAK

General information
- Location: Çakmak Mah. 42310; Ereğli, Konya; Turkey
- Coordinates: 37.6239°N 34.2878°E
- System: TCDD intercity rail station
- Owner: Turkish State Railways
- Operator: TCDD Taşımacılık
- Line: Taurus Express
- Platforms: 1 island platform
- Tracks: 2

Construction
- Structure type: At-grade
- Parking: Yes

Services
Preceding station	TCDD Taşımacılık	Following station
Ereğli towards Konya	Taurus Express	Osmancık towards Adana
Location

Çakmak railway station (Turkish: Çakmak istasyonu) is a railway station in the village of Çakmak, Konya in Turkey. The station consists of a narrow island platform serving two tracks, with four more tracks used as a siding.

TCDD Taşımacılık operates a daily intercity train, the Taurus Express from Konya to Adana.
