= Sudurağı railway station =

Station in the Karaman Province of Turkey

SUDURAĞI

General information
- Location: Sudurağı Köyü, 70000 Karaman Merkez/Karaman; Turkey
- Coordinates: 37.271811°N 33.374897°E
- System: TCDD intercity rail station
- Owner: Turkish State Railways
- Line: Taurus Express
- Platforms: 1 side platform

Construction
- Structure type: At-grade
- Parking: Yes

History
- Opened: 25 October 1904

Services
Preceding station	TCDD Taşımacılık	Following station
Karaman towards Konya	Taurus Express	Ayrancı towards Adana
Location

Sudurağı station is a station in the Karaman Province of Turkey. Located just south of Sudurağı, 2 km (1.2 mi) south of the town center. TCDD Taşımacılık operates a daily intercity train from Konya to Adana, which stops at the station.

Sudurağı station is 119 km (74 mi) southeast of Konya station and 250.9 km (155.9 mi) northwest of Adana station.
