= Ulukışla railway station =

Railway station in Turkey

ULUKIŞLA
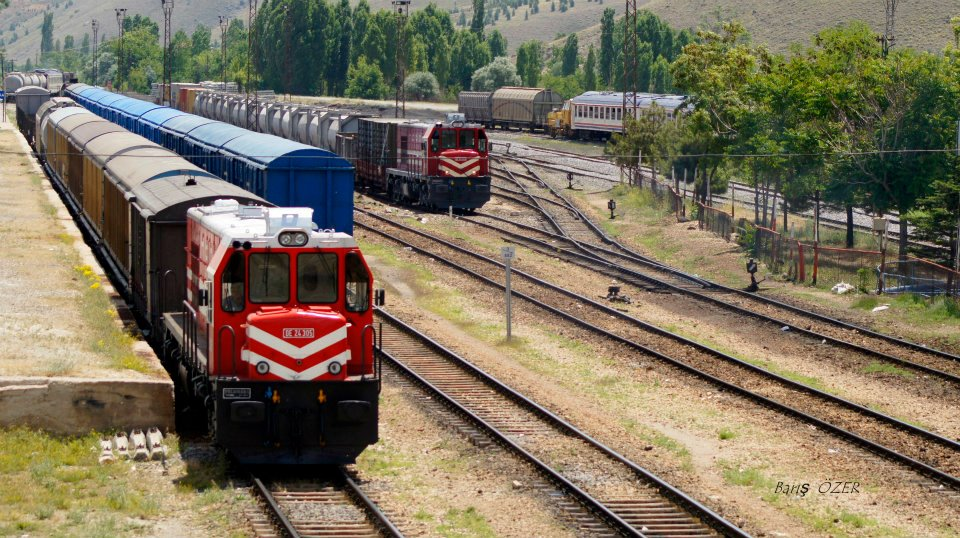
- Freight trains in the station yard; the platform can be seen in the upper-left corner.

General information
- Location: D.750, Kemalpaşa Mah. 51900; Ulukışla, Niğde; Turkey
- Coordinates: 37.5459°N 34.4805°E
- System: TCDD Taşımacılık intercity rail station
- Owner: Turkish State Railways
- Operator: TCDD Taşımacılık
- Line: Erciyes Express Taurus Express
- Platforms: 1 side platform
- Tracks: 4

Construction
- Structure type: At-grade
- Parking: Yes

History
- Opened: 1 July 1911

Services
Preceding station	TCDD Taşımacılık	Following station
Karalar towards Kayseri	Erciyes Express	Gümüş towards Adana
Osmancık towards Konya	Taurus Express	Gümüş towards Adana
Location

Ulukışla railway station (Turkish: Ulukışla istasyonu) is a railway station in Ulukışla, Turkey. The station is located in the southern part of the town and consists of one side platform serving four track. A small freight yard is also present as the line sees heavy freight traffic. Ulukışla station is the northern starting point of the railway through the Cilician Gates, and thus historically played an important role in helping trains pass through the Taurus Mountains.

Ulukışla station was originally opened on 1 July 1911, by the Baghdad Railway. Ulukışla was used as a staging point to help further construction through the mountains, storing material, helper locomotives and workers.

TCDD Taşımacılık operates two daily intercity trains from Konya and Kayseri to Adana.
