= Niğde railway station =

NİĞDE

General information
- Location: Divan Sk. 13, Burhan Mah. 51100; Niğde; Turkey
- Coordinates: 37.9655°N 34.6849°E
- System: TCDD Taşımacılık intercity rail station
- Owner: Turkish State Railways
- Operator: TCDD Taşımacılık
- Line: Erciyes Express
- Platforms: 2 (1 side platform, 1 island platform)
- Tracks: 3

Construction
- Structure type: At-grade
- Parking: Yes

Services
Preceding station	TCDD Taşımacılık	Following station
Bor towards Adana	Erciyes Express	Hüyük towards Kayseri
Location

Niğde railway station (Turkish: Niğde garı) is a railway station in Niğde, Turkey. TCDD Taşımacılık operates a daily intercity train, the Erciyes Express, from Kayseri to Adana.

Niğde station was built in 1933 by the Turkish State Railways, as part of a railway to link the Trans-Anatolian railway with the former Baghdad Railway as an eastern route from the Mediterranean coast to Turkey's central interior.
