= Karalar railway station =

Railway station in Turkey

KARALAR

General information
- Location: Güney Köyü 51900; Ulukışla, Niğde; Turkey
- Coordinates: 37.6340°N 34.4842°E
- System: TCDD Taşımacılık intercity rail station
- Owner: Turkish State Railways
- Operator: TCDD Taşımacılık
- Line: Erciyes Express
- Platforms: 1 side platform
- Tracks: 1

Construction
- Structure type: At-grade
- Parking: Yes

Services
Preceding station	TCDD Taşımacılık	Following station
Ulukışla towards Adana	Erciyes Express	Bereket towards Kayseri
Location

Karalar railway station (Turkish: Karalar istasyonu) is a railway station in the village of Güney in the Niğde Province of Turkey. The station consists of a side platform serving one track, with two more tracks as sidings. The O-21A motorway crosses over the station, however no connection is directly available.

TCDD Taşımacılık operates a daily intercity train, the Erciyes Express, from Kayseri to Adana.
