= Kemerhisar railway station =

Railway station in Turkey

KEMERHİSAR

General information
- Location: Durmuş Ali Durmaz Cd., Cumhuriyet Mah. 51730; Bor, Niğde; Turkey
- Coordinates: 37.8191°N 34.5495°E
- System: TCDD Taşımacılık intercity rail station
- Owner: Turkish State Railways
- Operator: TCDD Taşımacılık
- Line: Erciyes Express
- Platforms: 1 side platform
- Tracks: 1

Construction
- Parking: No

Services
Preceding station	TCDD Taşımacılık	Following station
Bereket towards Adana	Erciyes Express	Bor towards Kayseri
Location

Kemerhisar railway station (Turkish: Kemerhisar istasyonu) is a railway station near the town of Kemerhisar in the Niğde Province of Turkey. Kemerhisar station consists of a side platform serving one track. The station is located 1.6 km (0.99 mi) west of Kemerhisar on Durmuş Ali Durmaz Avenue.

TCDD Taşımacılık operates a daily intercity train, the Erciyes Express, from Kayseri to Adana.
