= Bor railway station =

Railway station in the town of Bor, Niğde in Turkey

Bor

General information
- Location: İstasyon Cd. 37, Dink Mah. 51700; Bor, Niğde; Turkey
- Coordinates: 37.8877°N 34.5623°E
- System: TCDD Taşımacılık intercity rail station
- Owner: Turkish State Railways
- Operator: TCDD Taşımacılık
- Line: Erciyes Express
- Platforms: 2 (1 side platform, 1 island platform)
- Tracks: 3

Construction
- Structure type: At-grade
- Parking: Yes

Services
Preceding station	TCDD Taşımacılık	Following station
Kemerhisar towards Adana	Erciyes Express	Niğde towards Kayseri
Location

Bor railway station (Turkish: Bor garı) is a railway station in the town of Bor, Niğde in Turkey. The station consists of one side platform and one island platform serving three tracks. TCDD Taşımacılık operates a daily intercity train, the Erciyes Express, from Kayseri to Adana.

Bor station was built in 1933 by the Turkish State Railways.
