= Ayrancı railway station =

Train station in Karaman Province, Turkey

AYRANCI

General information
- Location: İstasyon Cd., Yeni Mah., 70500 Ayrancı/Karaman; Turkey
- Coordinates: 37.370947°N 33.666477°E
- System: TCDD intercity rail station
- Owner: Turkish State Railways
- Line: Taurus Express
- Platforms: 1 side platform

Construction
- Structure type: At-grade
- Parking: Yes

History
- Opened: 25 October 1904

Services
Preceding station	TCDD Taşımacılık	Following station
Sudurağı towards Konya	Taurus Express	Ereğli towards Adana
Location

Ayrancı station is a station in the Karaman Province of Turkey. Located just north of Ayrancı, 2.3 km (1.4 mi) north of the town center. TCDD Taşımacılık operates a daily intercity train from Konya to Adana, which stops at the station.

Ayrancı station is 147.8 km (91.8 mi) southeast of Konya station and 222.1 km (138.0 mi) northwest of Adana station.
