= Bereket railway station =

Bereket railway station can refer to the following two stations:

- Bereket railway station (Turkmenistan), in the city of Bereket, Turkmenistan
- Bereket railway station (Turkey), near the village of Bereket, Niğde in Turkey.
