= Osmancık railway station =

Railway station in Turkey

OSMANCIK

General information
- Location: Tepeköy Köyü 51900; Ulukışla, Niğde; Turkey
- Coordinates: 37.6078°N 34.3652°E
- System: TCDD intercity rail station
- Owner: Turkish State Railways
- Operator: TCDD Taşımacılık
- Line: Taurus Express
- Platforms: 1 side platform
- Tracks: 1

Construction
- Structure type: At-grade
- Parking: Yes

Services
Preceding station	TCDD Taşımacılık	Following station
Çakmak towards Konya	Taurus Express	Ulukışla towards Adana
Location

Osmancık railway station (Turkish: Osmancık istasyonu) is a railway station in the village of Tepeköy, Niğde in Turkey. The station consists of a side platform serving one tracks.

TCDD Taşımacılık operates a daily intercity train, the Taurus Express from Konya to Adana.
