= Ereğli railway station =

Railway station in Turkey

EREĞLİ
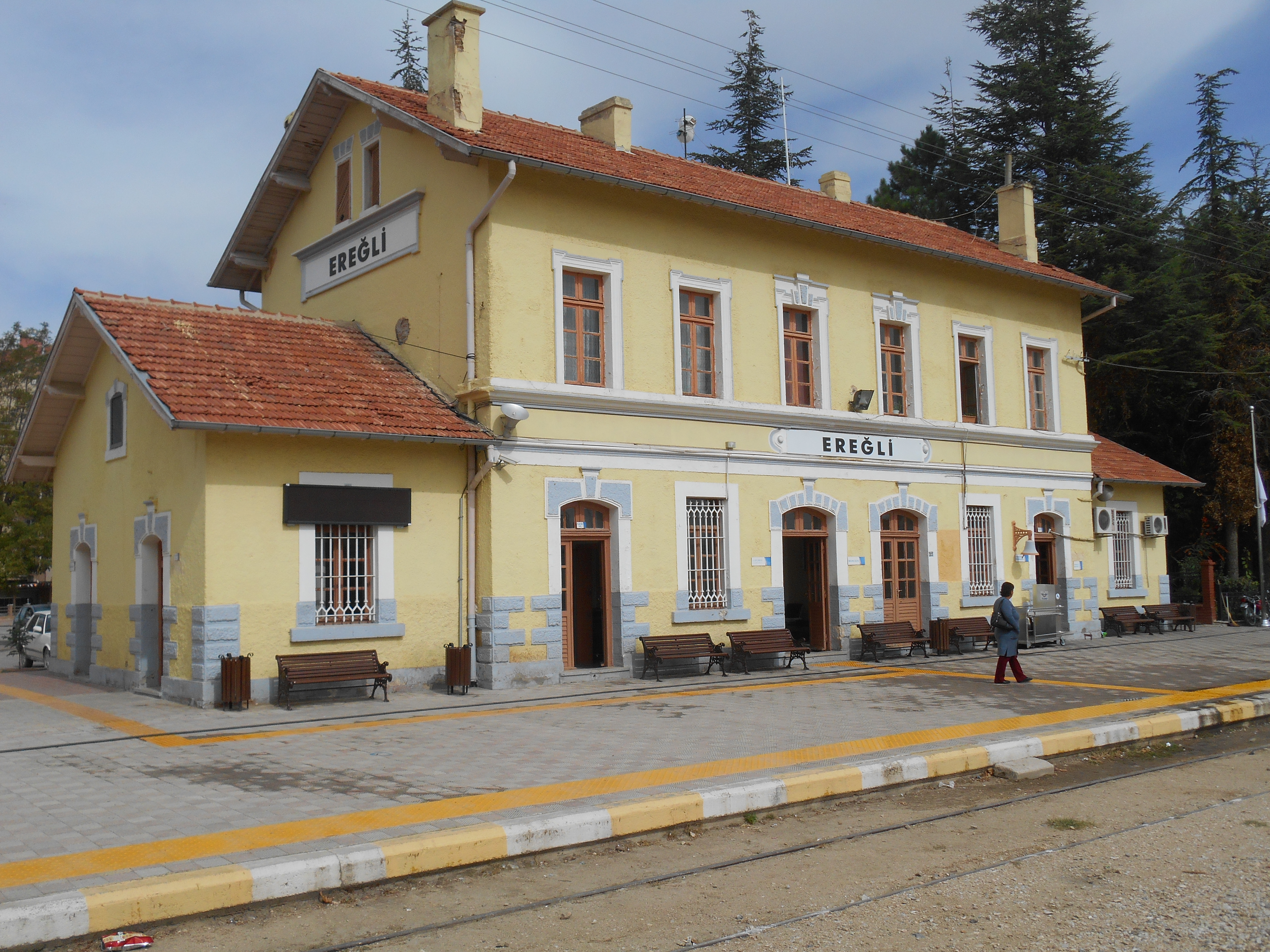
- Ereğli station building.

General information
- Location: Şht Polis Yalçın Çiçek Sk., Türbe Mah., 42310 Ereğli/Konya; Turkey
- Coordinates: 37.506018°N 34.057086°E
- System: TCDD intercity rail station
- Owner: Turkish State Railways
- Operator: TCDD Taşımacılık
- Line: Taurus Express
- Platforms: 1 side platform
- Tracks: 3

Construction
- Structure type: At-grade
- Parking: Yes

History
- Opened: 25 October 1904; 121 years ago

Services
Preceding station	TCDD Taşımacılık	Following station
Ayrancı towards Konya	Taurus Express	Çakmak towards Adana
Location

Ereğli station (Turkish: Ereğli gar is a railway station in the town of Ereğli in Konya Province. Once served by several train lines that have destinations to Istanbul, İzmir and Konya, the station is currently served by Toros Ekspresi only, which connects Ereğli to Adana and Karaman. The station will be popular again after the completion of the Konya-Ereğli section of the Konya-Gaziantep highspeed line.

== Images ==
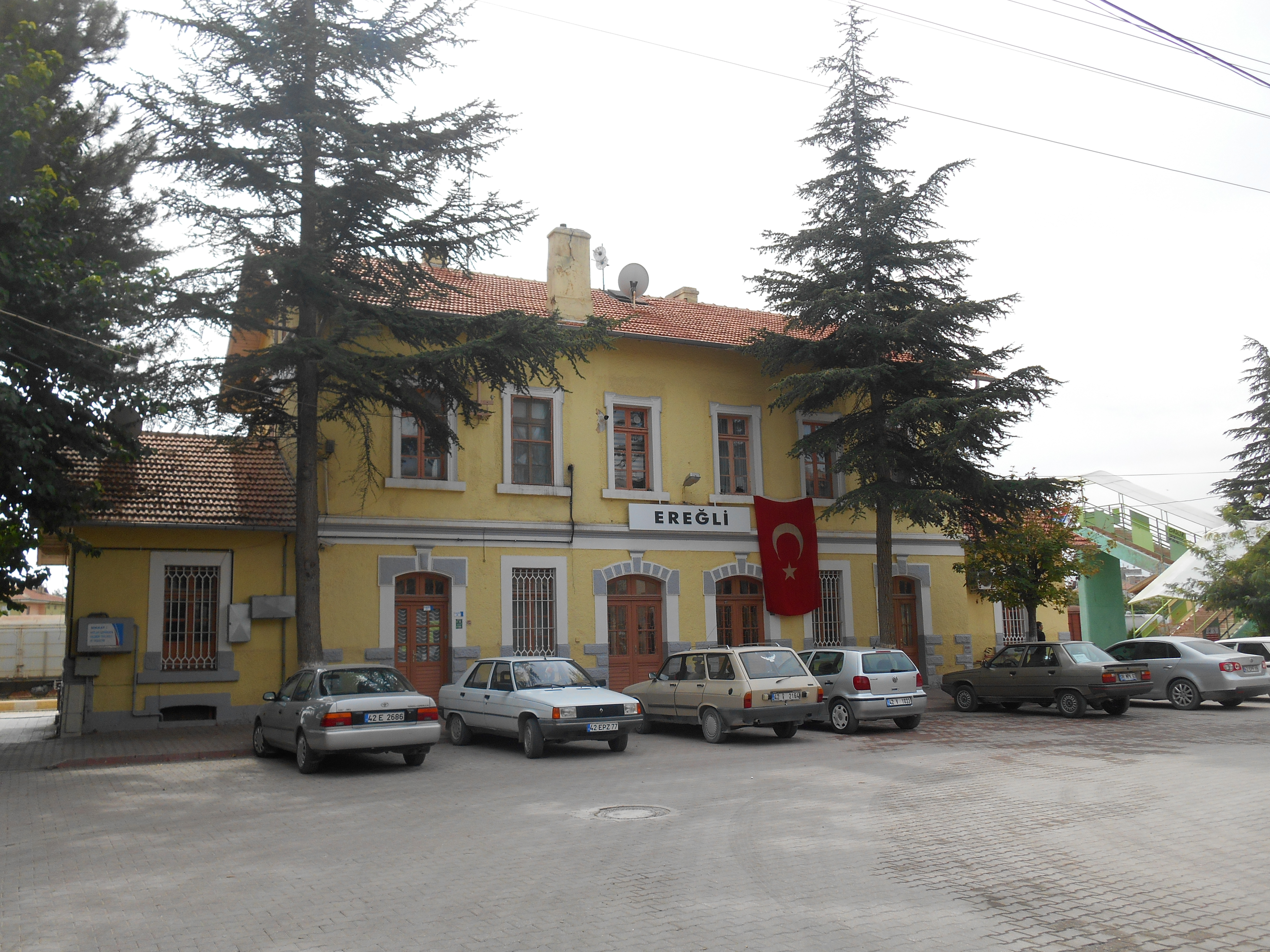
Station view from north

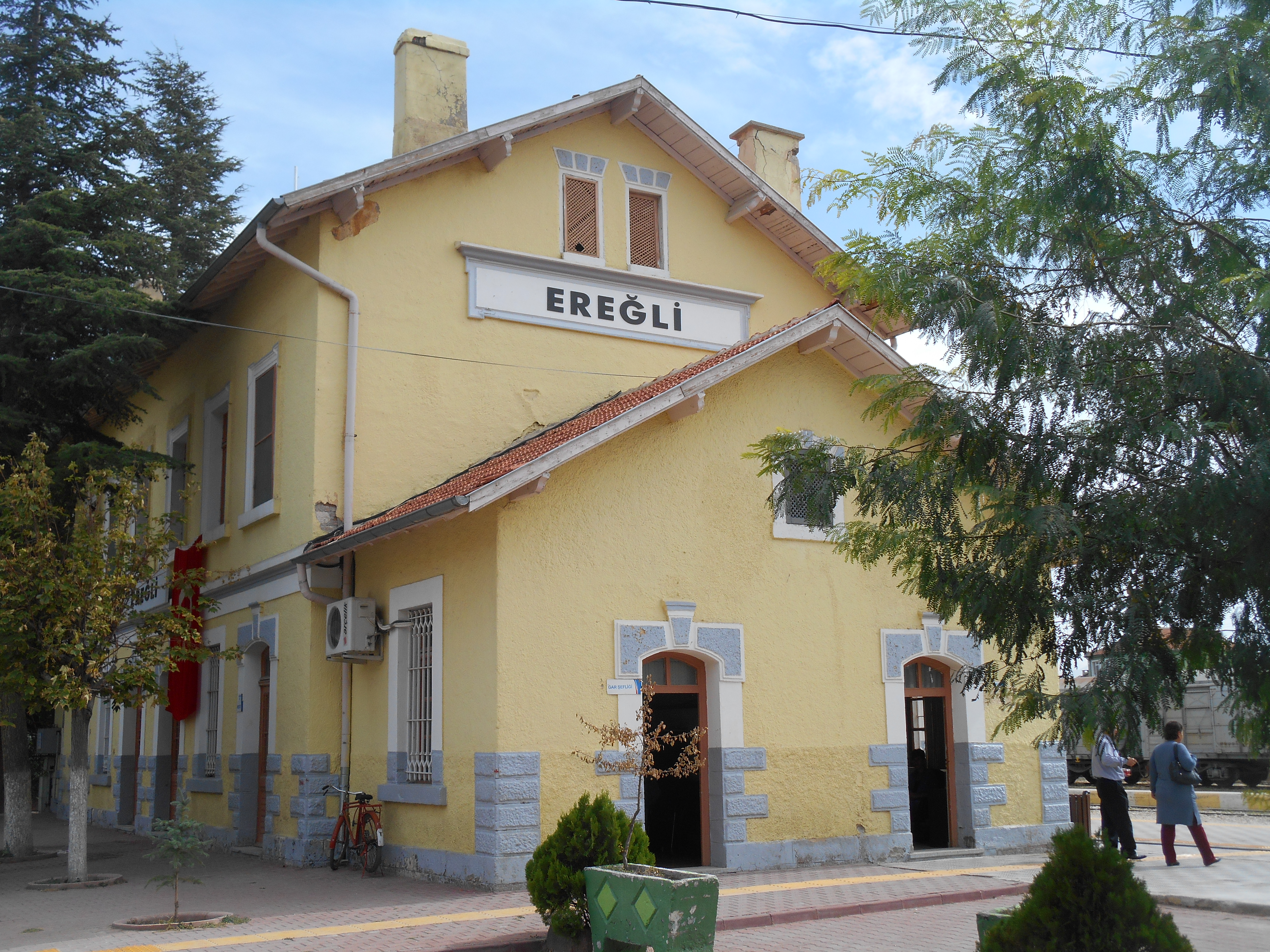
Station view from west

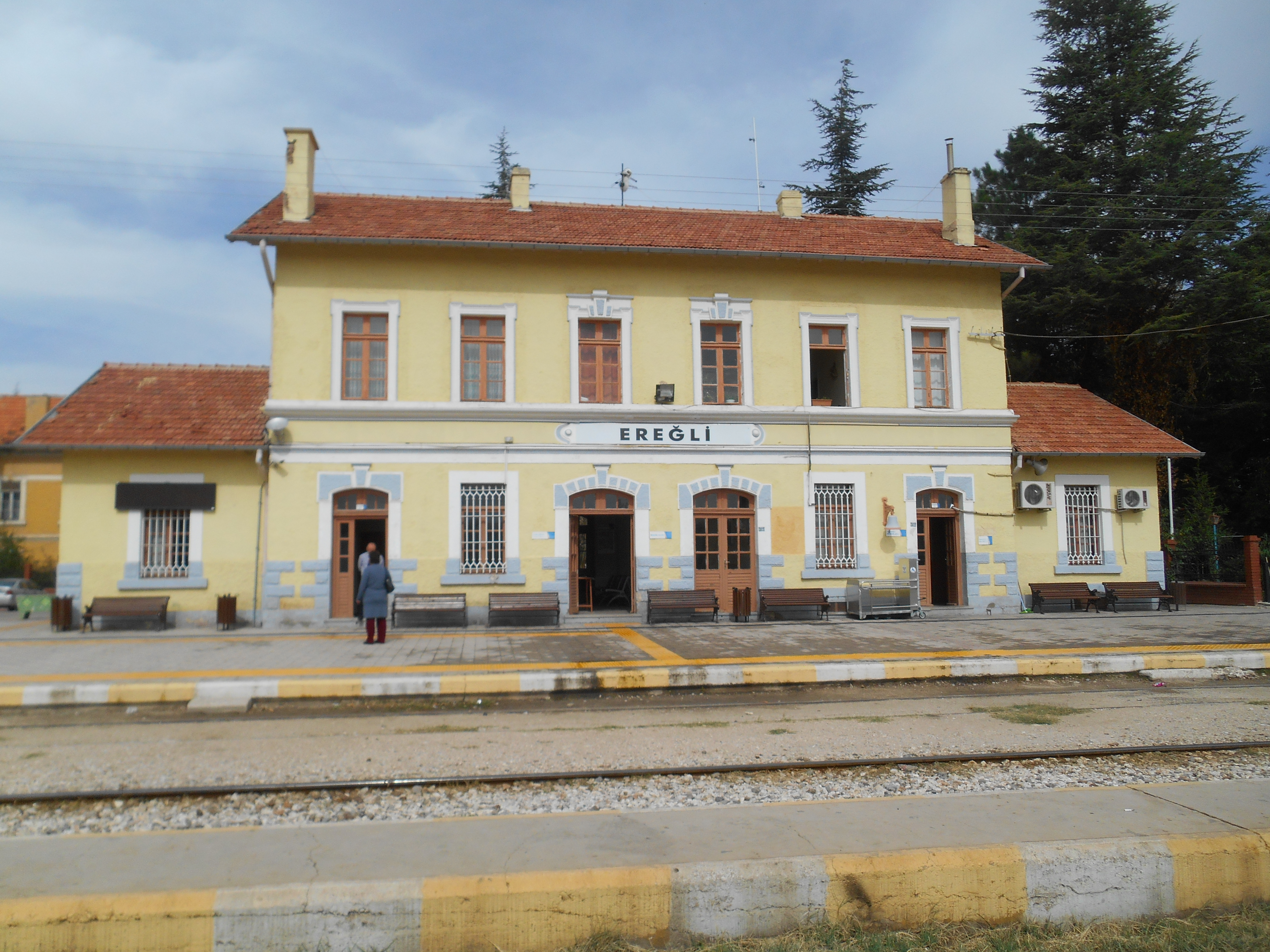
Station view from south

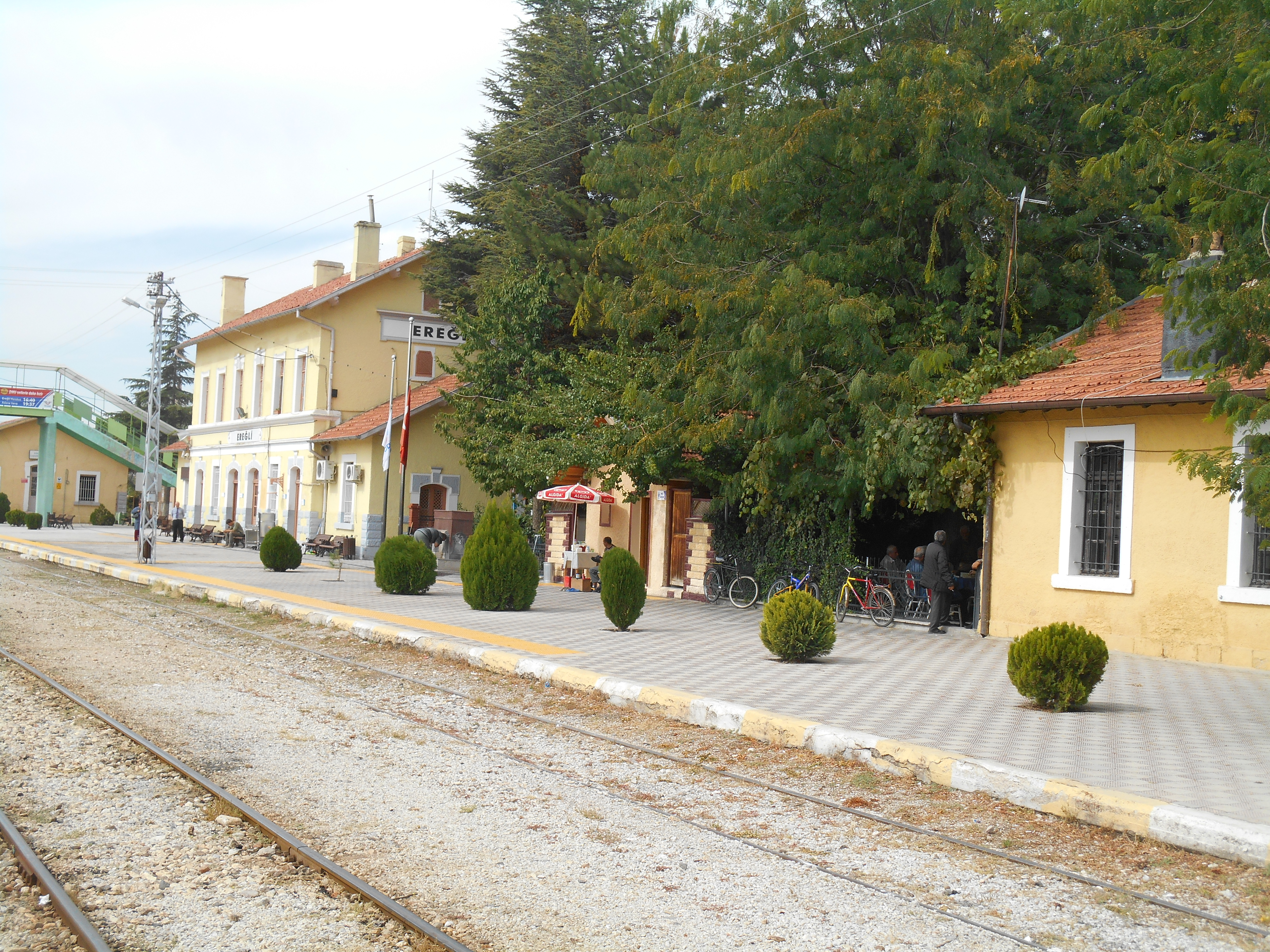
Station view from east

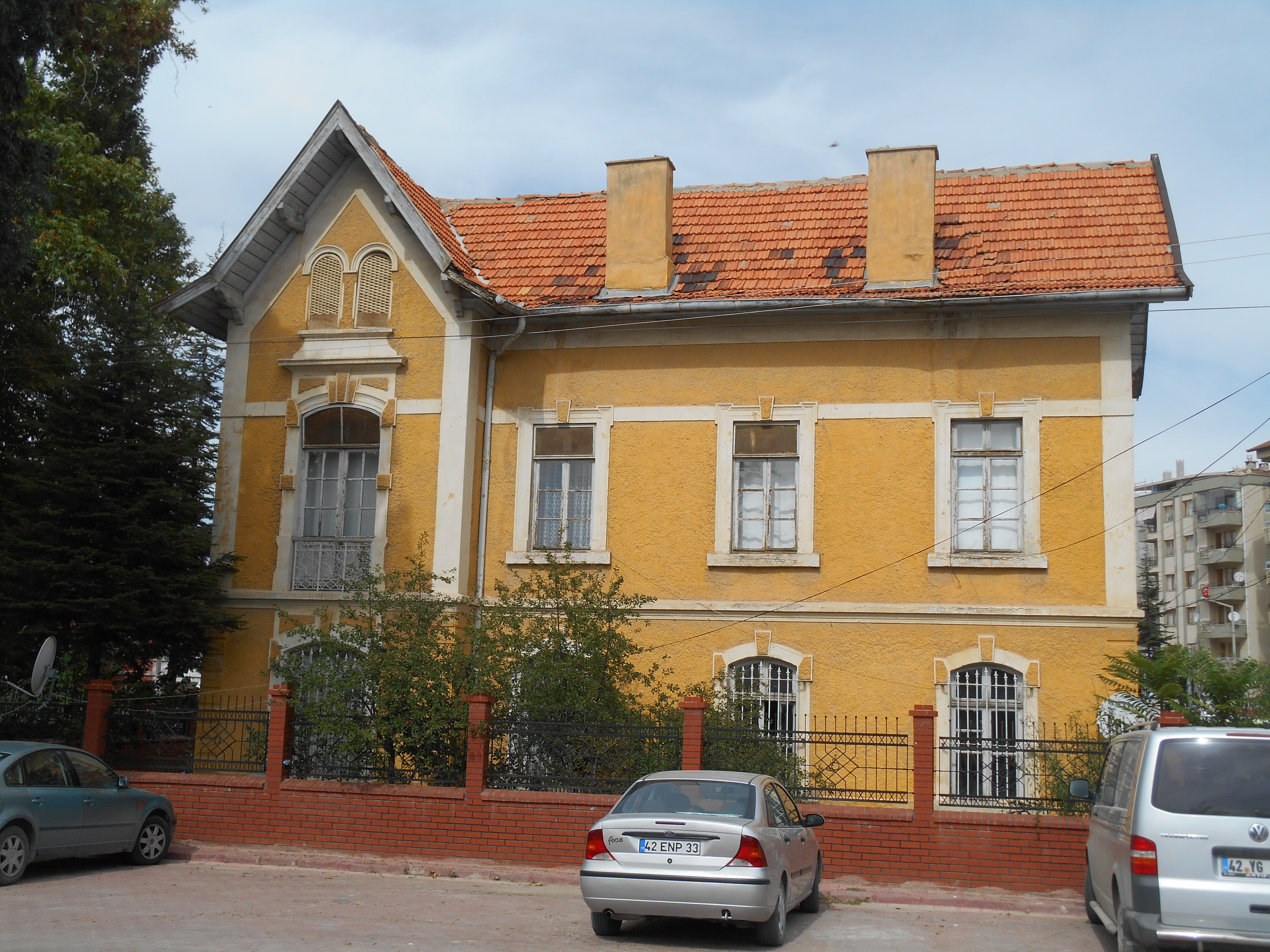
Residence

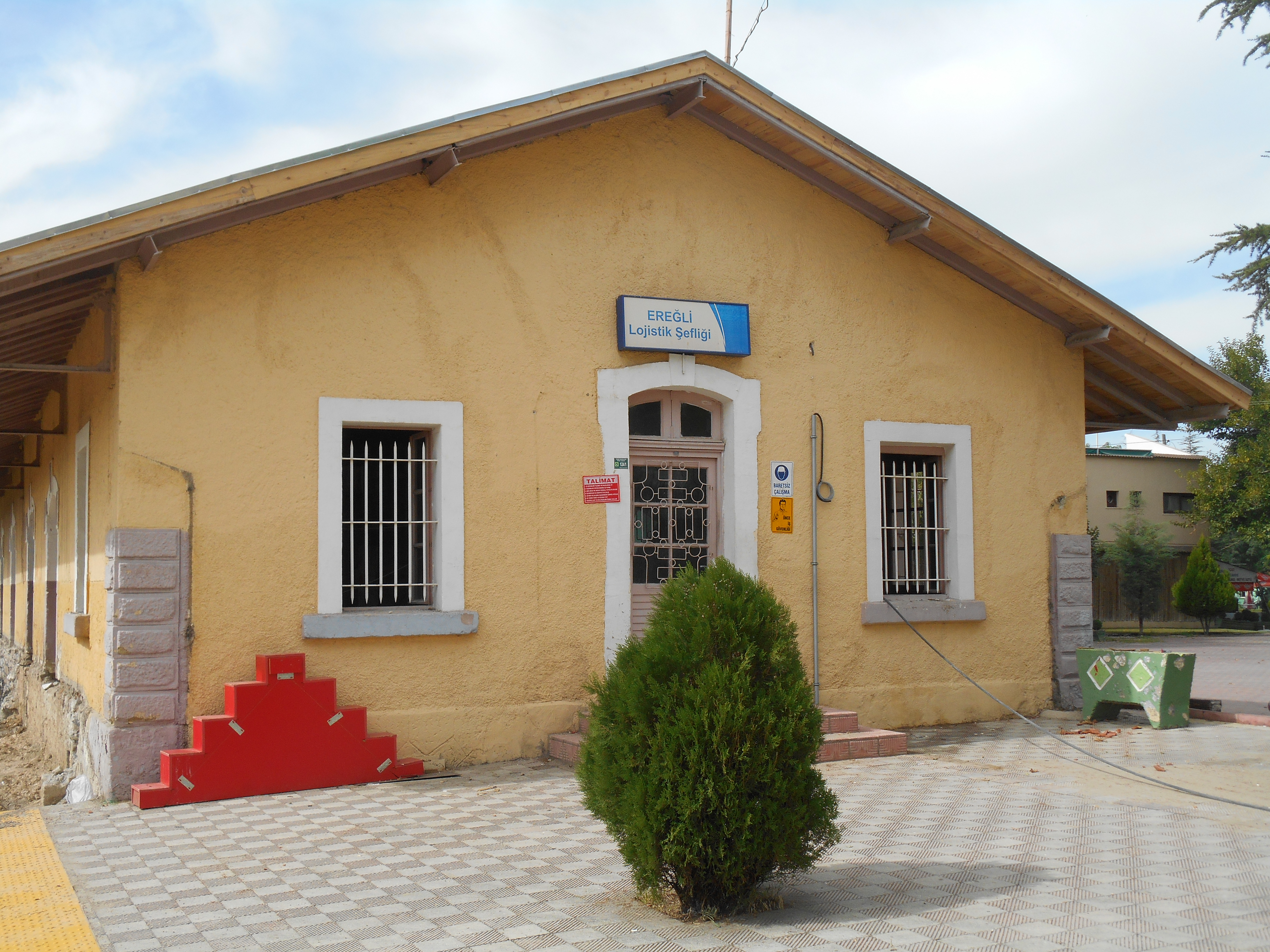
Logistics Department

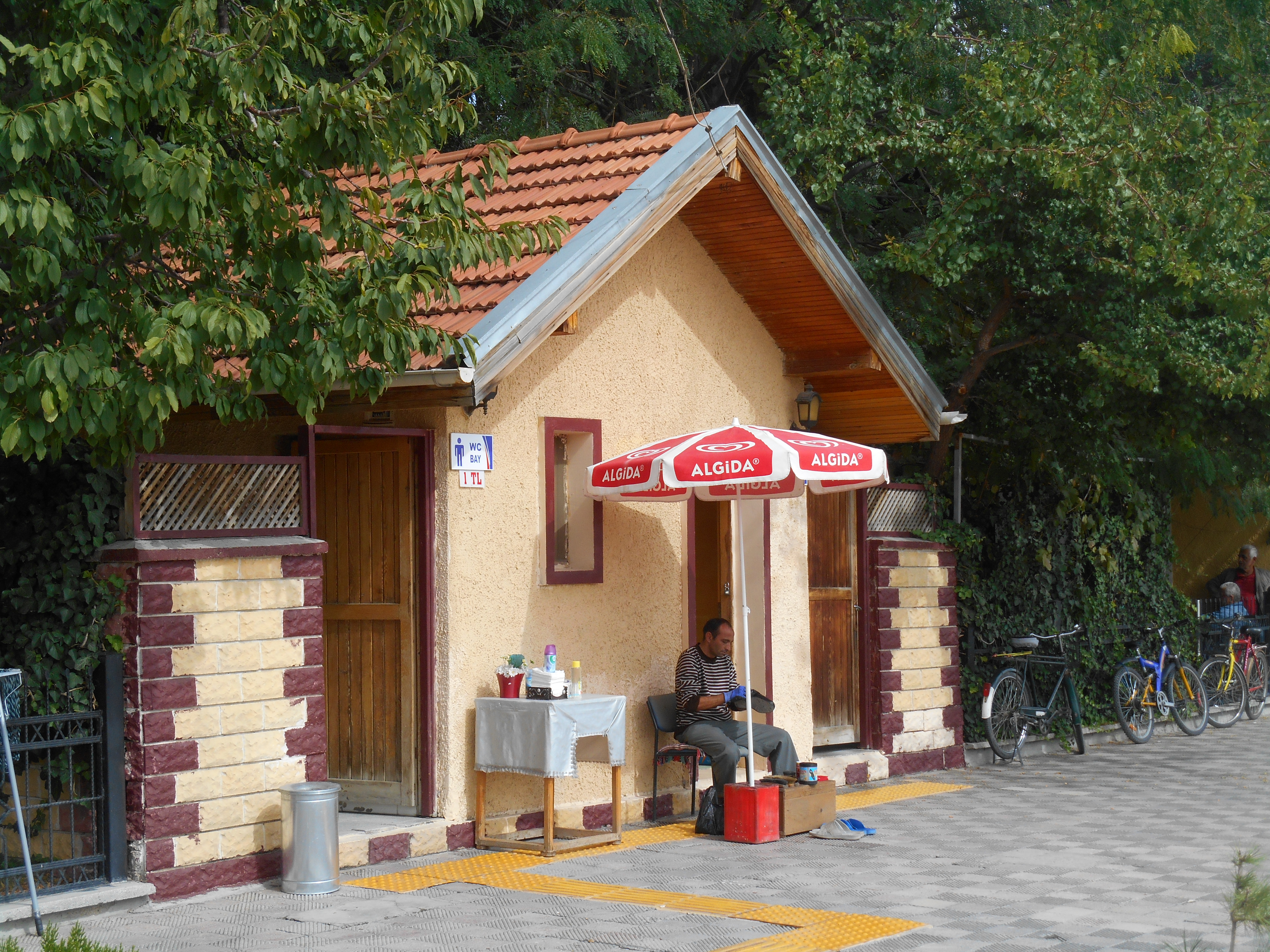
Service building

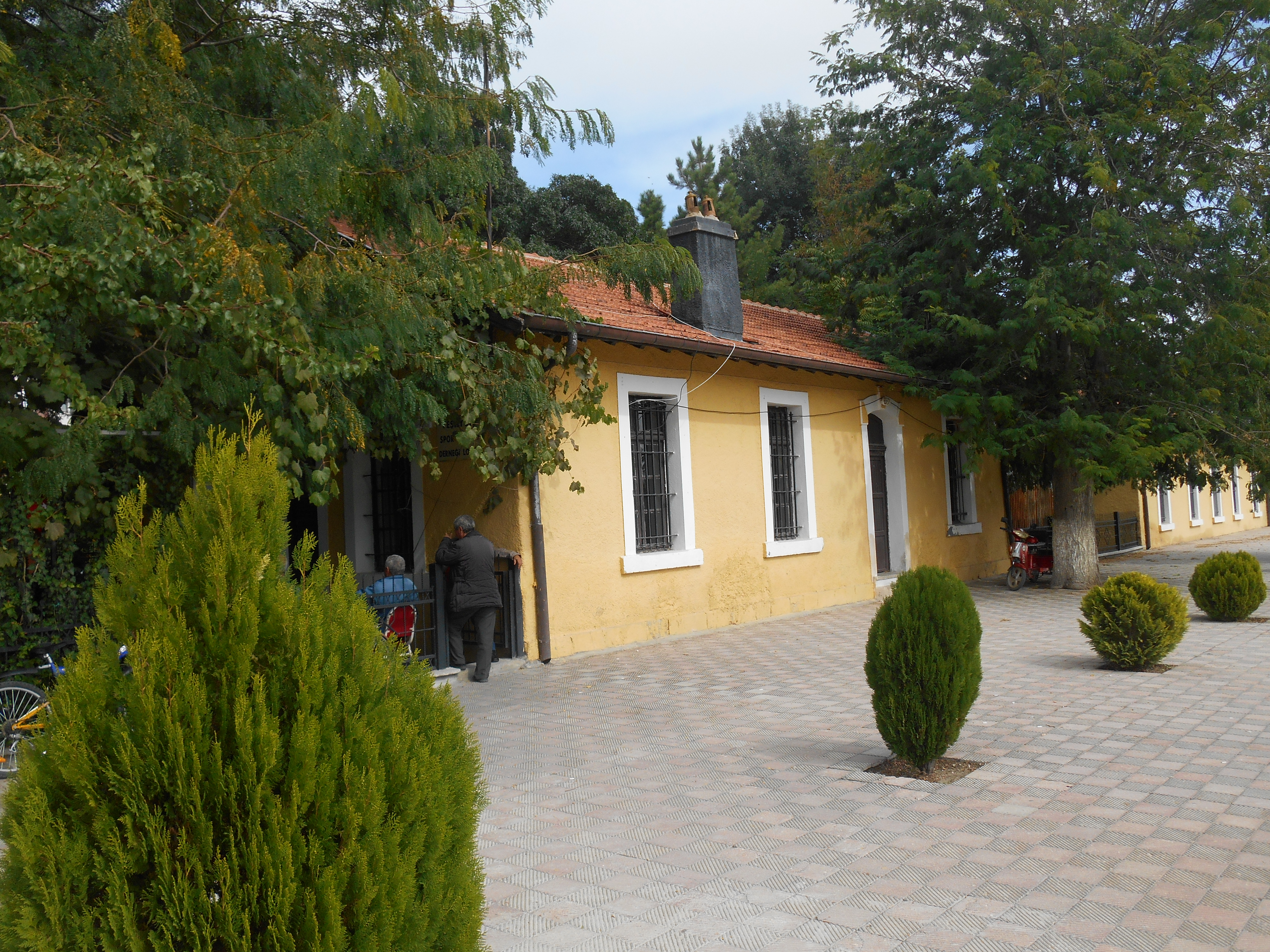
Service building

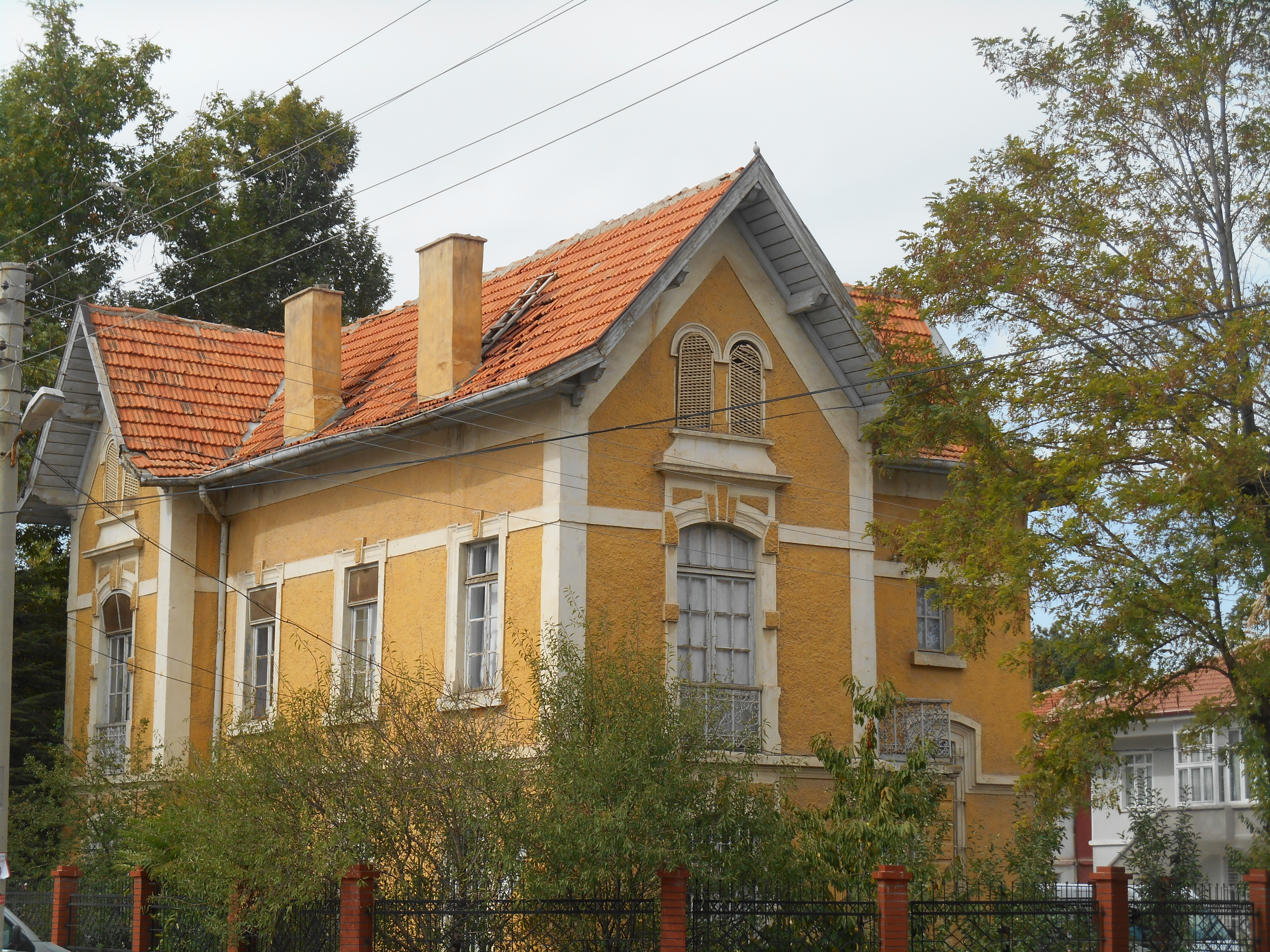
Residence Building

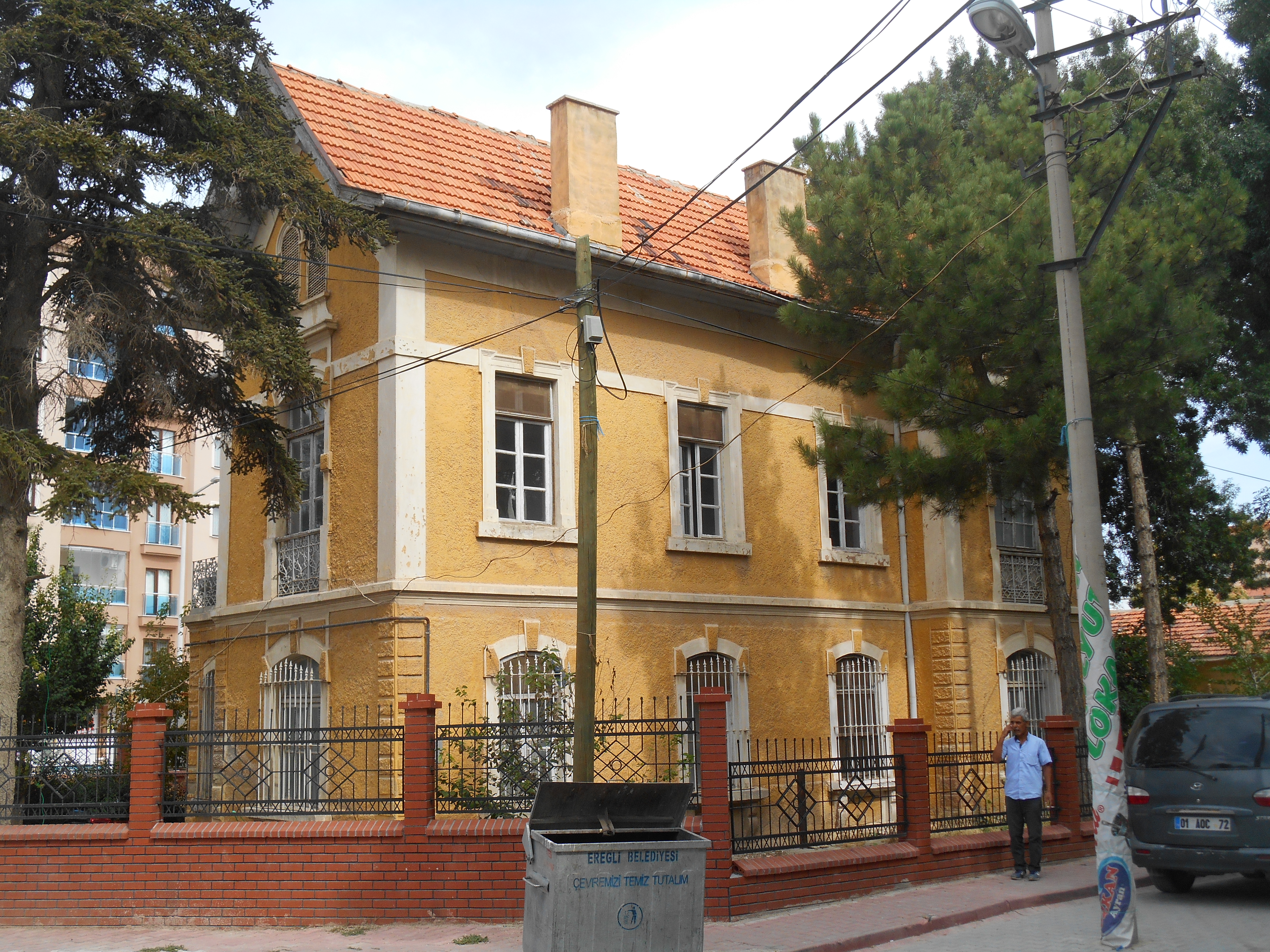
Residence Building

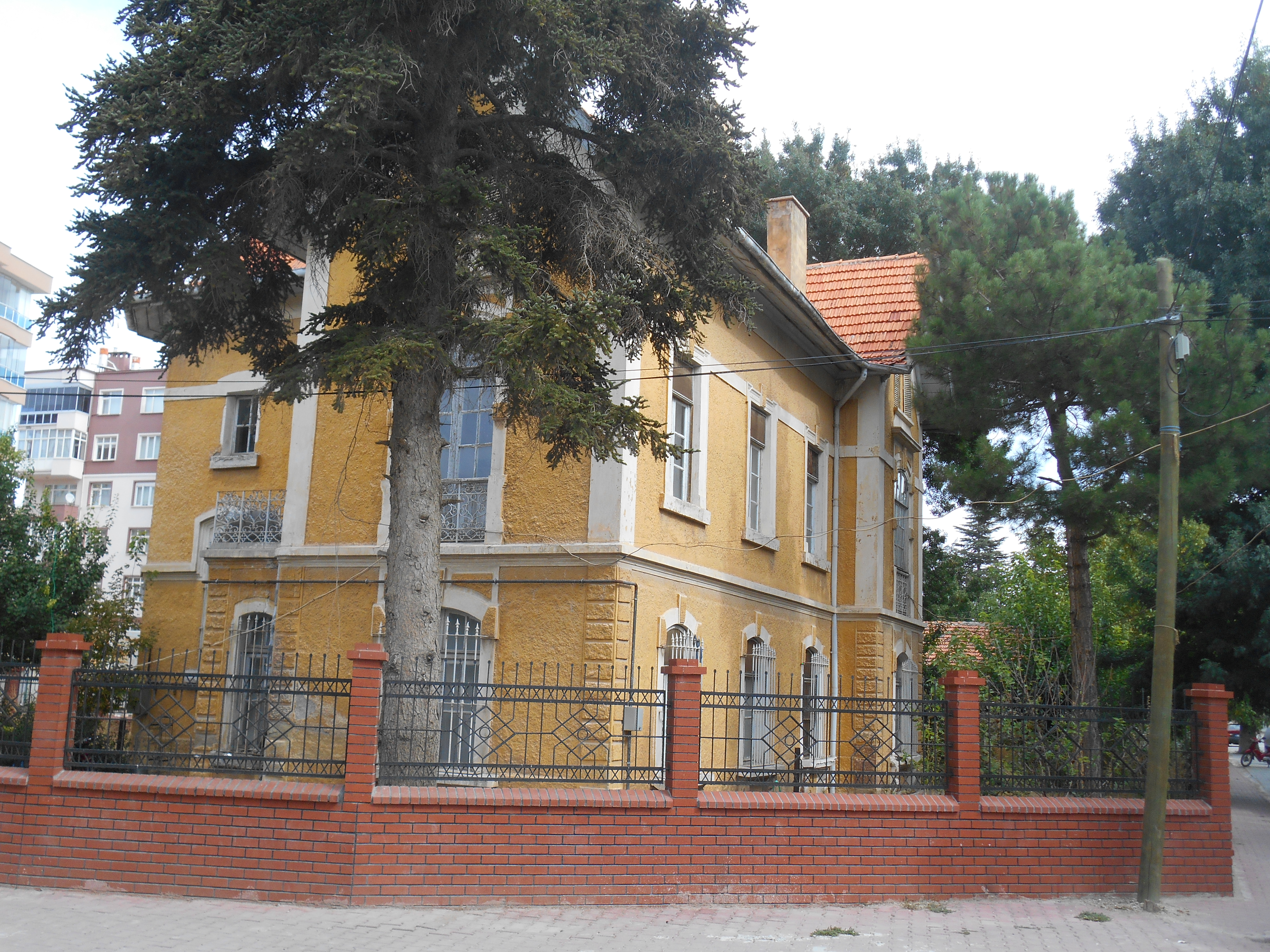
Residence Building
