= Volkan Ş. Ediger =

Turkish scientist and writer

- Born: 25 September 1953 (age 73); Ereğli, Turkey
- Occupations: Energy Adviser to the President of Turkey, Professor of Energy Systems Engineering
- Writing career
- Notable awards: Turkish Journalists Association Sedat Simavi Social Sciences Award(2006); Middle East Technical University Best Thesis Supervisor Award (2006); Turkish Association of Petroleum Geologists Cevat Eyüp Taşman Award (2007)

Volkan Ş. Ediger (born 1953, Ereğli, Konya) is a Turkish scientist, writer and bureaucrat. After graduating from the Middle East Technical University, he earned his PhD from the Pennsylvania State University in 1986. His training is in geology, geochemistry, and palynology.

After working as an oil and coal geologist in industry for some years his interest was switched into several energy issues, including energy resources, economics, policy, security and geopolitics.

Ediger's professional career has been shaped by research, teaching and consultancy simultaneously carried out at industry, university and government. Assigned as the first Energy Adviser to the President of Turkish Republic in 1998 and has worked for a total of twelve years with three Turkish presidents.

He was awarded the Sedat Simavi Social Sciences Award in 2006 for his book Neft and Petroleum in the Ottoman Empire. He was the first recipient of the Turkish Association of Petroleum Geologists’ Cevat Eyüp Taşman Award in 2007. He was listed in Top 10 Most Influential Voices in the Power Generation Today by POWER-GEN Europe in 2013.

He is the founder and president of the Energy and Climate Change Foundation (ENIVA) and founding executive committee of the Sustainable Production and Consumption Association (SUT-D), the first NGOs to be working in energy sustainability and climate change in Turkey. He served as the General Chair of ICE 2014, which was held by the American Association of Petroleum Geologists (AAPG) in 2014 in Istanbul and 5th Multinational Energy and Value Conference, which was held in İstanbul in 2015.

He moderated the forum for “The Big Energy Question: Powering Our Urban Future” as part of “The Great Energy Challenge”, a National Geographic Society Initiative organized in partnership with Shell in 2014 in Istanbul after Washington, D.C., and in London.

== Academic career ==
Ediger completed his B.Sc. (1976) and M.Sc. (1980) studies at Geological Engineering Department of the Middle East Technical University (METU), Turkey and Ph.D. at the Department of Geosciences of the Pennsylvania State University (PSU), USA in 1986. He was appointed associate professor in 1992, and full professor in 2010.

Ediger began his academic studies as teaching assistant in METU in 1976-77, and continued in PSU as research and teaching assistants and laboratory coordinator between 1982 and 1985. He has taught undergraduate and graduate courses on energy-related subjects.

Ediger became Professor of Energy Economics at Izmir University of Economics in 2010. He served there as Founding Director of Research and Graduate Policies (ALP) and Founding Chairman of Sustainable Energy Master Programme in addition to several other committees and boards. He has been working as Professor of Energy Systems Engineering and also as the head of the department at Kadir Has University (KHAS) since 2011. He was Founding Coordinator of Strategy Development and Research Office (STRAR) and Founding Director of Center for Energy and Sustainable Development (CESD).

== R&D works in industry ==
Ediger his career in industry at the Research Center of Turkish Petroleum Corporation (TPAO) in 1977 and served there as chief, manager, deputy head, and project adviser over the years. His career at TPAO mostly included implementation and management of a number of national and international petroleum research projects until 1998 when he became advisor to the president of Turkey. During his career, with the help of United Nations Development Programme Fellowship, he gained great experience on R&D project management during his visits to oil companies and universities in the US.

From 1977–1998, his findings were reported in 22 company reports (TPAO Report Nos. 190, 195, 276, 279, 287, 345, 427, 1065, 1185, 1255, 1264, 1265, 1269, 1565, 1755, 1757, 1949, 1964, 2097, 2118, 2191, 2312),

== Conference committees and commissions ==
Ediger served and has still been serving as member, executive member, and representative at professional societies as follows:

- 69th Geological Congress of Turkey, April 2016, Ankara, General Chair.
- Global Summit on Petroliferous Basins: Basin Evaluation, Research, Modeling and Development, 7–9 December 2016, Philadelphia, U.S., Organizing Committee Board.
- International Conference on Energy Security and Geopolitics in the Eastern Mediterranean, 15–17 October 2015, Kalkanlı, Turkish Republic of Northern Cyprus, Co-General Chair.
- Sustainable Business Awards, Jury (2015)
- IPETGAS-International Oil and Gas Conference and Exhibition, 27–29 May 2015, Ankara, Program Committee
- 5th Multinational Energy and Value Conference, İstanbul, 7–10 May 2015, General Co-Chair.
- II. Nuclear Power Plants Summit, Istanbul, 19–20 March 2015, Scientific Committee
- II İstanbul Carbon Summit, 2–3 April 2015, Scientific Committee Co-Chair, Organizing Committee.
- İstanbul Metropolitan Municipality 2015-2019 Strategic Plan, 12–13 June 2014, Expert
- Gaziantep Municipality, Energy Efficiency in Industry Awards 2014, Jury Member
- I. Nuclear Power Plants Summit, Istanbul, 30–31 May 2014, Scientific Committee
- 38th IAEE (International Association for Energy Economics) International Conference,
- Antalya, 6–8 April 2015, Publications Committee Chair (2013–2014), International Program Committee.
- AAPG (American Association of Petroleum Geologists) ICE–International Conference Exhibition, İstanbul, 14–17 September 2014, General Chair.
- I. İstanbul Carbon Summit, 3–5 April 2014, Scientific Committee Co-Chair, Organizing Committee.
- Fifth Green Business 2013, Advisory Board.
- AAPG Geosciences Technology Workshop on Hydrocarbon Trapping Mechanisms in the Middle East, İstanbul, 10–12 December 2012, Technical Programme Committee
- Green Business 2012, Advisory Board.
- Sezin Schools, Fourth Futurist Scenario Contest, Jury.
- İstanbul Stock Market (İMKB) Sustainability Index Project (ISESI), Advisory Board (since 2010)
- Second EIF International Energy Congress, Ankara, 21–22 October 2010, President.
- Sixth Kadir Has Awards on Renewable Energy Potential and Availability in Turkey, Jury Member (2010)
- International Carbon Markets Arena, Istanbul, 13–14 August 2009, Chairman.
- INGAS 2009–Third International Natural Gas Symposium, Honors and Advisor Committee.
- Thirty-First IAEE International Conference 2008, (The First Zero-Emission Conference Organized in Turkey), Executive Committee
- The Scientific and Technological Research Council of Turkey, Public R&D Projects Evaluation Panelist (2008)
- General Staff of Turkey, Strategic Research and Study Center (SAREM), External Energy Specialist (2007–2012)
- Istanbul Technical University Petroleum and Natural Gas Engineering Department
- Industrial Advisory Board (2006)
- Istanbul University Scientific Project Evaluation, Adviser (2003)
- Second International Symposium on the Petroleum Geology and Hydrocarbon Potential of the Black Sea Area, Scientific Committee (1996)
- Eleventh Petroleum Congress of Turkey, Scientific Committee (1996)
- Sixth International Symposium on Fossil Algae and Carbonate Platforms Scientific Committee (1995)
- Symposium of Geology of Thrace Basin, President of the Scientific Committee Vice President of the Organization Committee (1995)
- Turkish Prime Ministry State Planning Organization’s Seventh Five-Year Development Plan, Energy Commission (1991–1995)
- IESCA-International Earth Sciences Congress of Aegean Region, Scientific Committee (1990)
- Eighth Petroleum Congress of Turkey, Scientific Committee (1990)
- Fifth Petroleum Congress of Turkey, Technical Program Committee Secretary (1980)
- TMMOB Chambers of Geological Engineers, Petroleum Commission (1982)

== Professional societies ==
- Business-to-Business (B2B) Matchmaking Society, Founding Executive Board (since 2014)
- Cercle d’Orient (2014–)
- SUT-D-Sustainable Production and Consumption Association, Founding Executive Board (since 2013)
- American Association of Petroleum Geologists, Member (since 2013)
- Foundation on Energy and Climate Change (ENIVA), Founding President (since 2010)
- Turkish Council of Foreign Relations, Member (since 2009)
- Center for Middle East Strategic Studies (ORSAM), Advisory Board (2008–2013)
- IAEE Turkish Association for Energy Economics (EED), Founding Member (2005–) Executive Board (2005–2010; 2012–2015), Auditing Board (2010–2012)
- Fossil Ankara Group, Member (since 2001)
- Middle East Technical University Alumni Association, Member (since 2000)
- World Energy Council Turkish National Committee, Member (since 1997)
- Ozan Sungurlu Science, Education and Aid Fund, Member (since 1992), Science and Education Committee President (1994–1998)
- TPAO Personnel Fund, Member (1987–), Executive Board (1992–1993)
- Regional Committee on Mediterranean Neogene Stratigraphy, Member (1989–1998)
- Ankara Turkish-American Association, Member (since 1987)
- International Federation of Palynological Societies Representative of Turkey (1979–1990)
- Turkish Committee for Palynology, President (1979–1980, 1991–1992)
- American Association of Stratigraphic Palynologists (AASP), Member (1989–1998), Middle East Regional Representative (1989–1992)
- Turkish Association of Petroleum Geologists (TAPG), Member (since 1978)
- Chamber of Geological Engineers of Turkey, Member (since 1976), METU Representative (1976)
- Geological Society of Turkey, Member (1973–1987), Executive Board (1980)

== Publications in SCI-SSCI Indexed Journals ==
- Berk, İ; Ersoy, M (2015). "An Assessment of Mining Efficiency in Turkish Lignite Industry". Resources Policy. 45: 44–51. Bibcode:2015RePol..45...44E. doi:10.1016/j.resourpol.2015.03.010.
- Berk, İ.; Kösebalaban, A. (2014). "Lignite Resources of Turkey: Geology, Reserves, and Exploration History". International Journal of Coal Geology. 132: 13–22. Bibcode:2014IJCG..132...13E. doi:10.1016/j.coal.2014.06.008.
- Yıldırım, Ç.; Baysan, A. (2013). "Europeanization under Membership Uncertainty: The Cases of Environmental and Energy Policy in Turkey". Uluslararas İlişkiler. 10 (39): 131–152.
- Devlen, B.; McDonald, D.B. (2012). "The Great Game in the Levant: Energy Geopolitics in the Eastern Mediterranean". Uluslararası İlişkiler. 9 (33): 73–92.
- Berk, İ (2011). "Crude Oil Import Policy of Turkey: Historical Analysis of Determinants and Implications since 1968". Energy Policy. 39 (4): 2132–2142. doi:10.1016/j.enpol.2011.01.058.
- Hoşgör, E.; Sürmeli, A.N.; Tatıdil, H. (2007). "Fossil Fuel Sustainability Index: An Application of Resource Management". Energy Policy. 35 (5): 2969–2977. doi:10.1016/j.enpol.2006.10.011. hdl:11511/67500.
- Akar, S (2007). "ARIMA Forecasting of Primary Energy Demand by Fuel in Turkey". Energy Policy. 35 (3): 1701–1708. doi:10.1016/j.enpol.2006.05.009. hdl:11511/65270.
- Çamdalı, Ü (2007). "Energy and Exergy Efficiencies in Turkish Transportation Sector, 1988-2004". Energy Policy. 35 (2): 1238–1244. doi:10.1016/j.enpol.2006.03.021.
- Çamdalı, Ü (2007). "Optimization of Fossil Fuel Resources in Turkey: An Exergy Approach". Energy Sources, Part A: Recovery, Utilization, and Environmental Effects. 29 (3): 251–259. doi:10.1080/15567030600917041. S2CID 110542482.
- Huvaz, Ö.; Karahanoğlu, N. (2007). "The Thermal Gradient History of the Thrace Basin, NW Turkey: Correlation with Basin Evolution Processes". Journal of Petroleum Geology. 30 (1): 3–24. Bibcode:2007JPetG..30....3H. doi:10.1111/j.1747-5457.2007.00003.x. hdl:11511/42970. S2CID 131059337.
- Akar, S.; Uğurlu, B. (2006). "Forecasting Production of Fossil Fuel Sources in Turkey Using a Comparative Regression and ARIMA Model". Energy Policy. 34 (18): 3836–3846. doi:10.1016/j.enpol.2005.08.023. hdl:11511/67272.
- Huvaz, Ö (2006). "Examining the Sectoral Energy Use in Turkish Economy (1980–2000) with the help of Decomposition Analysis". Energy Conversion and Management. 47 (6): 732–745. doi:10.1016/j.enconman.2005.05.022.
- Madlener, R.; Kumbaroglu, G. (2005). "Modeling Technology Adoption as an Irreversible Investment under Uncertainty: The Case of the Turkish Electricity Supply Industry". Energy Economics. 28 (1): 139–163. doi:10.1016/j.eneco.2004.10.007. hdl:20.500.11850/148087.
- Ediger, Volkan Ş. (2003). "Classification and Performance Analysis of Primary Energy Consumers during 1980–1999". Energy Conversion and Management. 44 (19): 2991–3000. doi:10.1016/s0196-8904(03)00102-x. hdl:11511/63907.
- Tatlıdil, H (2002). "Forecasting the Primary Energy Demand in Turkey and Analysis of Cyclic Patterns". Energy Conversion and Management. 43 (4): 473–487. doi:10.1016/S0196-8904(01)00033-4. hdl:11511/65088.
- Kentel, E (1999). "Renewable energy potential as an alternative to fossil fuels in Turkey". Energy Conversion and Management. 40 (7): 743–755. doi:10.1016/s0196-8904(98)00122-8. hdl:11511/37936.
- Batı, Z.; Kozlu, H. (1996). "Tortonian-Messinian Palynomorphs from the Easternmost Mediterranean Region around Iskenderun, Turkey". Micropaleontology. 42 (2): 189–205. Bibcode:1996MiPal..42..189E. doi:10.2307/1485870. JSTOR 1485870.
- Batı, Z.; Alişan, C. (1990). "Paleopalynology and Paleoecology of Calamus–like Disulcate Pollen Grains". Review of Palaeobotany and Palynology. 62 (1–2): 97–105. Bibcode:1990RPaPa..62...97E. doi:10.1016/0034-6667(90)90019-F.
- Alişan, C (1989). "Tertiary Fungal and Algal Palynomorph Biostratigraphy of the Northern Thrace Basin, Turkey". Review of Palaeobotany and Palynology. 58 (2–4): 139–161. Bibcode:1989RPaPa..58..139E. doi:10.1016/0034-6667(89)90082-1.
- Ediger, Volkan Ş.; Ediger, Volkan S. (1986). "Sieving Techniques in Palynological Sample Processing with Special Reference to the MRA System". Micropaleontology. 32 (3): 256–270. Bibcode:1986MiPal..32..256E. doi:10.2307/1485620. JSTOR 1485620.

== Books and chapters in book ==
- 2014, History of TKI and Coal, and Coal Strategies of Turkey, Turkish Coal Enterprises Project Report, Turkish Coal Enterprises Publications, Ankara, 497 p., December 2014. ISBN No: 978-605-5310-63-9.
- 2013, ed., Climate Change and Sustainable Energy in Turkey, ENIVA Publications, 146 p., ISBN No: 978-605-64066-0-7.
- 2013, “Effects of Climate Change in Turkey: Scientific Evidences”, in: Ediger, V.Ş., ed., Climate Change and Sustainable Energy in Turkey, ENIVA Publications, p. 61-80. ISBN No: 978-605-64066-0-7.
- 2011, "Energy Transition Periods: Lessons Learnt from the Past", in: The Oil Era: Emerging Challenges, Abu Dhabi, ECSSR (The Emirates Center for Strategic Studies and Research) Publications, p. 175-202.
- 2011, New World Order in Energy and Turkey, Akademi Forumu No. 67, Ankara, TÜBA-Turkish Academy of Sciences, 62 p.
- 2009, “Towards the Maturation Period of Turkish Think Tanks”, in: Hasan Kanbolat and Hasan Ali Karasar, eds., Strategic Thinking Culture and Strategic Research Centers: Turkish Think Tanks from the Beginning, Ankara, Nobel Publications, p. 197-207.
- 2008, "National Energy Report of Turkey: Energy Situation, Challenges, and Policies for Sustainable Development", in: AASA Beijing Workshop on Sustainable Energy Development in Asia, 2008, Beijing, China, InterAcademy Council, p. 77-93.
- 2007, "Energy Supply Security and Its Relationship with National Security", in: Energy Supply Security, Ankara, SAREM Publications, p. 1–47.
- 2005, Neft and Oil in the Ottoman Empire, Ankara, METU Press, 472 p., Second Edition in February 2006 and Third Edition in 2007. Turkish Journalists Association, Sedat Simavi Social Sciences Award 2006.

== Personal life ==
He and his wife, Elçin Öztürk, have one daughter.
