= Ereğli, Konya =

Ereğli
- District and municipality
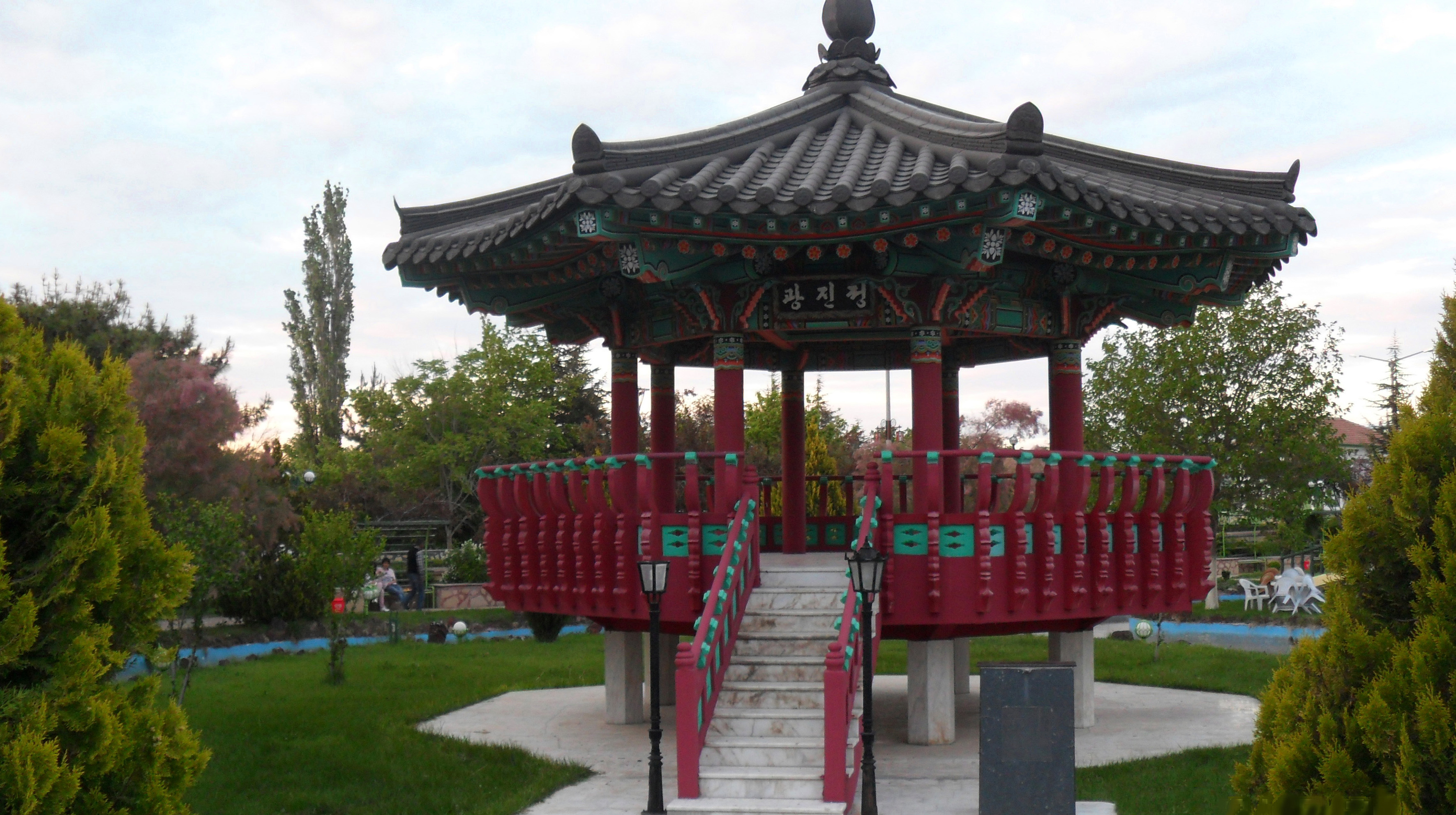
- Kwangjin Park in Ereğli

- Logo

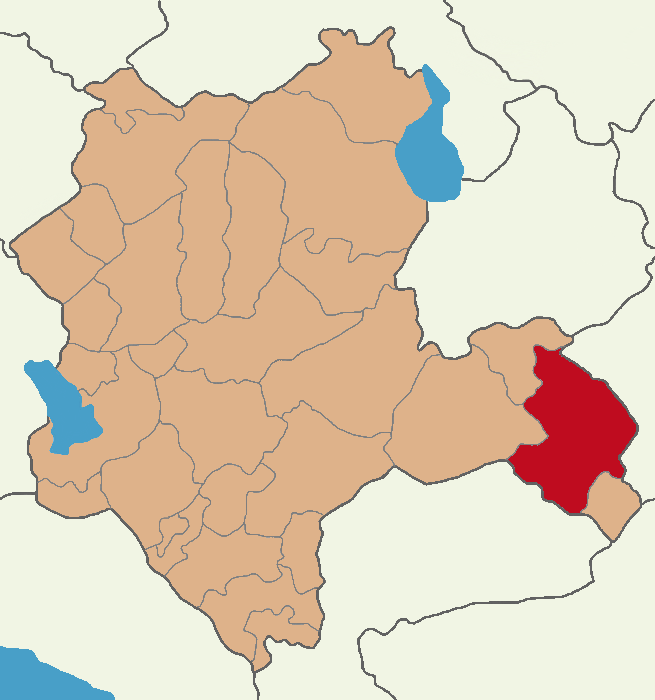
- Map showing Ereğli District in Konya Province

- Location within Turkey Location within Turkey Central Anatolia
- Coordinates: 37°30′46″N 34°02′54″E
- Country: Turkey
- Province: Konya

Government
  - Mayor: Ümit Akpınar (CHP)
  - Kaymakam: Oğuz Cem Murat
- Area: 2,214 km^{2} (855 sq mi)
- Elevation: 1,038 m (3,406 ft)
- Population (2024): 156,253
  - Density: 70.57/km^{2} (182.8/sq mi)
- Time zone: UTC+3 (TRT)
- Area code: 0332
- Website: www.eregli.bel.tr

Ereğli is a municipality and district of Konya Province, Turkey. Its area is 2,214 km^{2}, and its population is 150,978 (2022). Its elevation is 1,038 m (3,406 ft).

== History ==
The ancient town of Heraclea Cybistra (Ηράκλεια Κυβίστρα in Ancient Greek) was located here, and gave its name (Heracles) to the modern town. The town had some importance in Hellenistic times owing to its position near the point where the road to the Gülek Pass (Cilician Gates) enters the hills. It lay in the way of armies and was more than once sacked by the Arab invaders of Asia Minor (AD 805 and 832). During the Crusade of 1101 it was the scene of a failed battle of 15,000 men led by William II, Count of Nevers against the Seljuks, which left the Crusaders weak en route to Antioch. It became Turkish (Seljuk) in the 11th century.

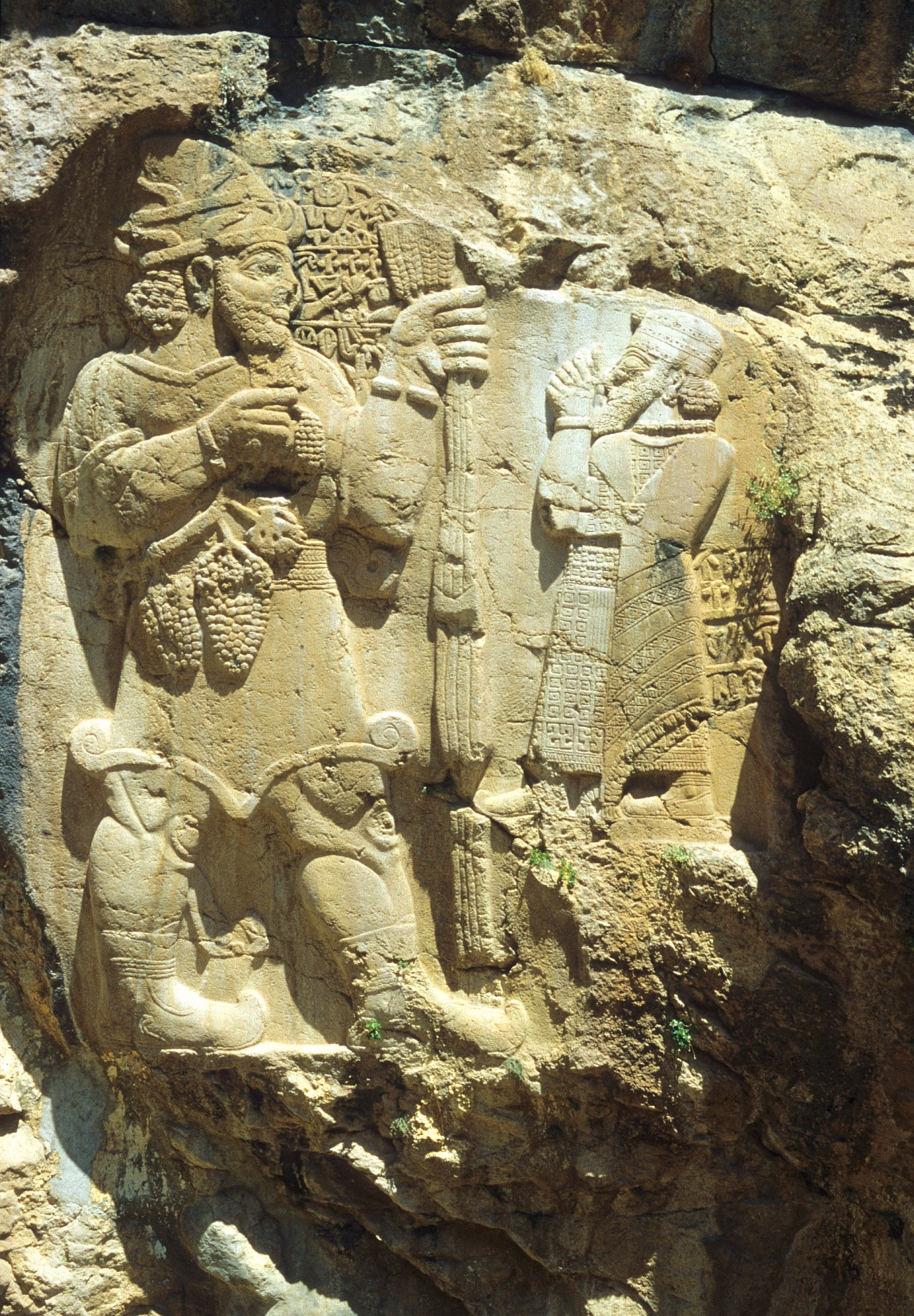
İvriz relief, near Ereğli. It depicts the late 8th-century BC king Warpalawas and the storm-god Tarhunzas, with a hieroglyphic Luwian inscription.

Ereğli is also known for being the first capital of the Karaman Beylik founded by Nur Sufi Bey. The Karaman state was renowned for being a consistent nuisance to Ottoman dominance in Anatolia, being one of the few Anatolian beyliks to retain sovereignty well past Mehmed the Conqueror's conquest of Constantinople. It was also the first political entity and beylik in Anatolia to proclaim Turkish as an official language alongside Arabic and Persian. In 1553, upon return from a campaign in Persia, Suleiman the Magnificent had his son, Şehzade Mustafa, killed in the Ereğli valley where the Ottoman Army was stationed. Modern Ereğli had grown from a large village to a town since the railway reached it from Konya and Karaman in 1904; and it has now hotels and thriving businesses.

== Archaeology ==
Three hours’ ride south is the famous "Hittite" rock relief of a lynx, representing a king (probably of neighbouring Tyana) adoring a god. This was the first "Hittite" monument discovered in modern times (early 18th century, by the Swede Otter, an emissary of Louis XIV).

Ereğli may be the location of the Hittite town of Hupisna (Ḫupišna), where the goddess Ḫuwaššanna was worshipped. She was linked with Gazbaba, a Mesopotamian love goddess also connected with Inanna.

In the early Iron Age, Hupisna also was a neo-Hittite polity in the land of Tabal. Two kings of Hupisna are known from the Assyrian sources: Puḫamme (c. 837 BC) and Urimme (c. 738 BC).

=== Konya-Ereğli (KEYAR) project ===
The Konya-Ereğli project is also known as KEYAR: the Konya Ereğli, Karapınar, Halkapınar and Emirgazi Survey Project. It was launched to survey the ancient settlements in the Ereğli plain. The project has identified Middle and Late Bronze Age settlements at various sites like Ereğli Kara Höyük and Tont Kalesi. Archaeologists have found Hittite drab ware pottery, as well as wheel-thrown ceramics indicating Hittite imperial influences.

== Composition ==
There are 87 neighbourhoods in Ereğli District:

- 500 Evler
- Acıkuyu
- Acıpınar
- Adabağ
- Akhüyük
- Alhan
- Alpaslan
- Aşağıgöndelen
- Aşıklar
- Atakent
- Aydınlar
- Aziziye
- Bahçeli
- Barbaros
- Batıalagözü
- Belceağaç
- Belkaya
- Beyköy
- Beyören
- Boyacıali
- Bulgurluk
- Burhaniye
- Büyükdede
- Cahı
- Çakmak
- Camikebir
- Çayhan
- Çiller
- Çimencik
- Cinler
- Çömlekçi
- Dalmaz
- Doğualagözlü
- Eti
- Fatih
- Gaybi
- Gökçeyazı
- Göktöme
- Gülbahçe
- Hacımemiş
- Hacımustafa
- Hacımutahir
- Hamidiye
- Hıdırlı
- Hortu
- Kamışlıkuyu
- Karaburun
- Kargacı
- Kazancı
- Kızılgedik
- Kuskuncuk
- Kutören
- Kuzukuyu
- Mehmet Akif
- Mellicek
- Mimar Sinan
- Namık Kemal
- Orhangazi
- Orhaniye
- Özgürler
- Pınarözü
- Pirömer
- Sarıca
- Sarıtopallı
- Selçuklu
- Servili
- Şinasi
- Sümer
- Talatpaşa
- Taşağıl
- Taşbudak
- Tatlıkuyu
- Toros
- Türbe
- Türkmen
- Üçgöz
- Ulumeşe
- Yazlık
- Yellice
- Yenibağlar
- Yeniköy
- Yıldırımbeyazıt
- Yıldızlı
- Yukarıgöndelen
- Yunuslu
- Zengen
- Ziya Gökalp

== Climate ==
Ereğli has a cold semi-arid climate (Köppen: BSk), with hot, dry summers, and cold winters.

Climate data for Ereğli, Konya (1991–2020)
| Month | Jan | Feb | Mar | Apr | May | Jun | Jul | Aug | Sep | Oct | Nov | Dec | Year |
|---|---|---|---|---|---|---|---|---|---|---|---|---|---|
| Mean daily maximum °C (°F) | 5.9 (42.6) | 8.1 (46.6) | 13.4 (56.1) | 18.7 (65.7) | 23.9 (75.0) | 28.6 (83.5) | 32.3 (90.1) | 32.2 (90.0) | 28.0 (82.4) | 21.6 (70.9) | 13.7 (56.7) | 7.6 (45.7) | 19.6 (67.3) |
| Daily mean °C (°F) | 0.3 (32.5) | 2.0 (35.6) | 6.9 (44.4) | 11.8 (53.2) | 16.6 (61.9) | 20.9 (69.6) | 24.2 (75.6) | 23.8 (74.8) | 19.4 (66.9) | 13.7 (56.7) | 6.7 (44.1) | 2.1 (35.8) | 12.4 (54.3) |
| Mean daily minimum °C (°F) | −4.0 (24.8) | −3.1 (26.4) | 0.8 (33.4) | 5.1 (41.2) | 9.4 (48.9) | 13.2 (55.8) | 15.7 (60.3) | 15.3 (59.5) | 11.0 (51.8) | 6.4 (43.5) | 0.8 (33.4) | −2.2 (28.0) | 5.7 (42.3) |
| Average precipitation mm (inches) | 33.11 (1.30) | 28.31 (1.11) | 33.91 (1.34) | 37.02 (1.46) | 34.15 (1.34) | 26.1 (1.03) | 6.46 (0.25) | 5.1 (0.20) | 10.36 (0.41) | 22.11 (0.87) | 29.26 (1.15) | 39.58 (1.56) | 305.47 (12.03) |
| Average precipitation days (≥ 1.0 mm) | 5.8 | 5.4 | 6.1 | 6.7 | 6.0 | 3.9 | 1.9 | 1.6 | 2.5 | 3.6 | 4.7 | 6.4 | 54.6 |
| Average relative humidity (%) | 77.0 | 71.4 | 62.4 | 58.3 | 57.0 | 52.0 | 45.2 | 47.1 | 51.9 | 61.0 | 70.1 | 77.4 | 60.9 |
| Mean monthly sunshine hours | 98.8 | 128.5 | 183.9 | 224.4 | 278.1 | 325.4 | 361.4 | 343.3 | 282.2 | 209.1 | 144.2 | 91.4 | 2,670.7 |
Source: NOAA

== Transportation ==
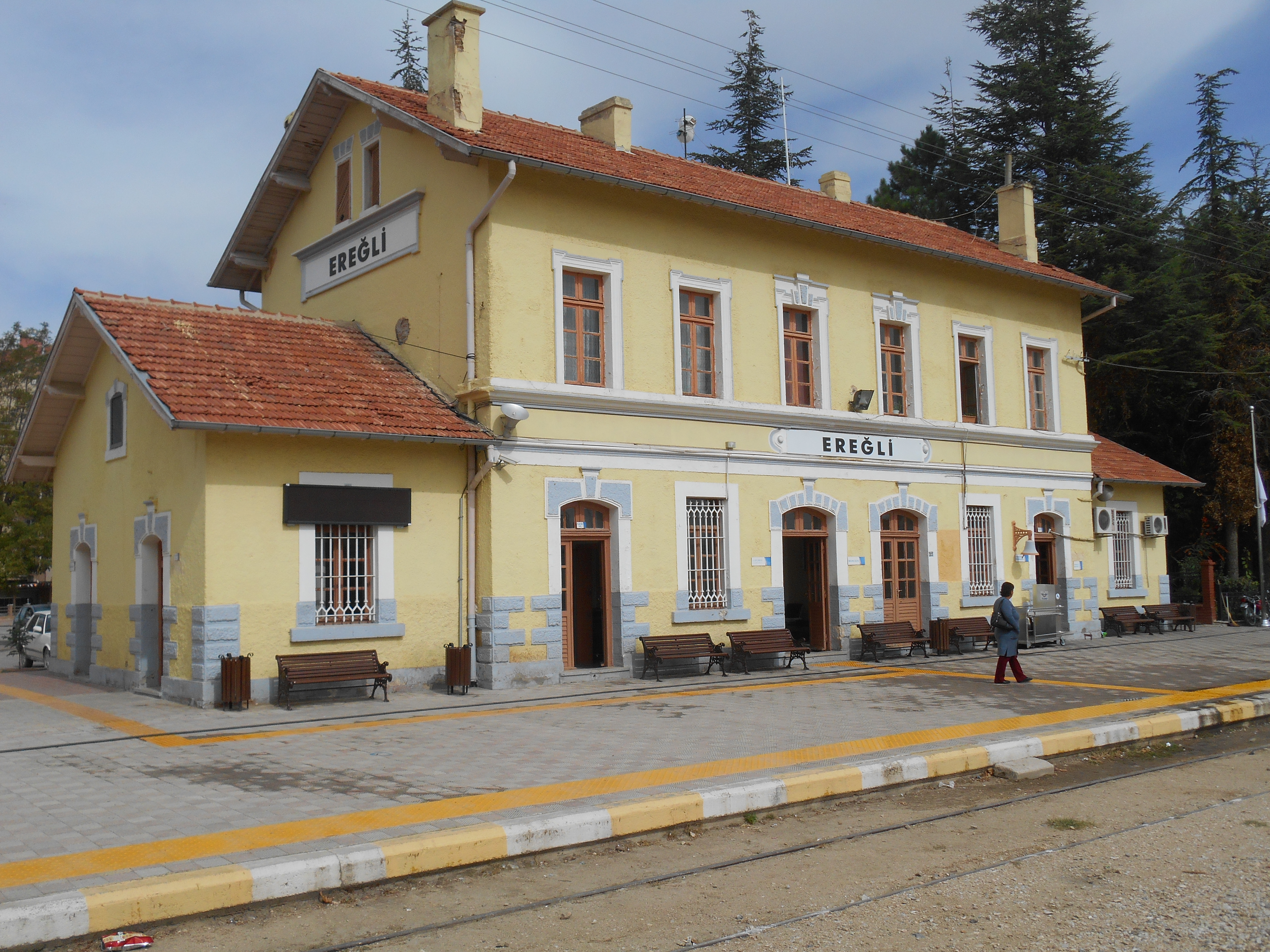
Railway station

Ereğli Gar is the railway station of the town. Once served by several train lines that have destinations to Istanbul, İzmir and Konya, the station is currently served by Mainline / Toros Ekspresi only, which connects Ereğli to Adana and Karaman.

== Notable residents ==
- Nimet Çubukçu, former Minister of National Education of Turkey.
- Ali Talip Özdemir, former head of the Motherland Party (ANAP)
- Şehzade Mustafa, heir to the Ottoman throne who was killed in the Ereğli valley
- Volkan Ş. Ediger (born 1953), is a scientist, writer and bureaucrat.

== International relations ==
Ereğli is twinned with:

- Hydra, Greece (since 1996)
- Gwangjin (Seoul), South Korea

== See also ==
- Kwangjin Park, a park in Ereğli.
