= Kwangjin Park =

Park in Turkey

- (Kore Parkı)
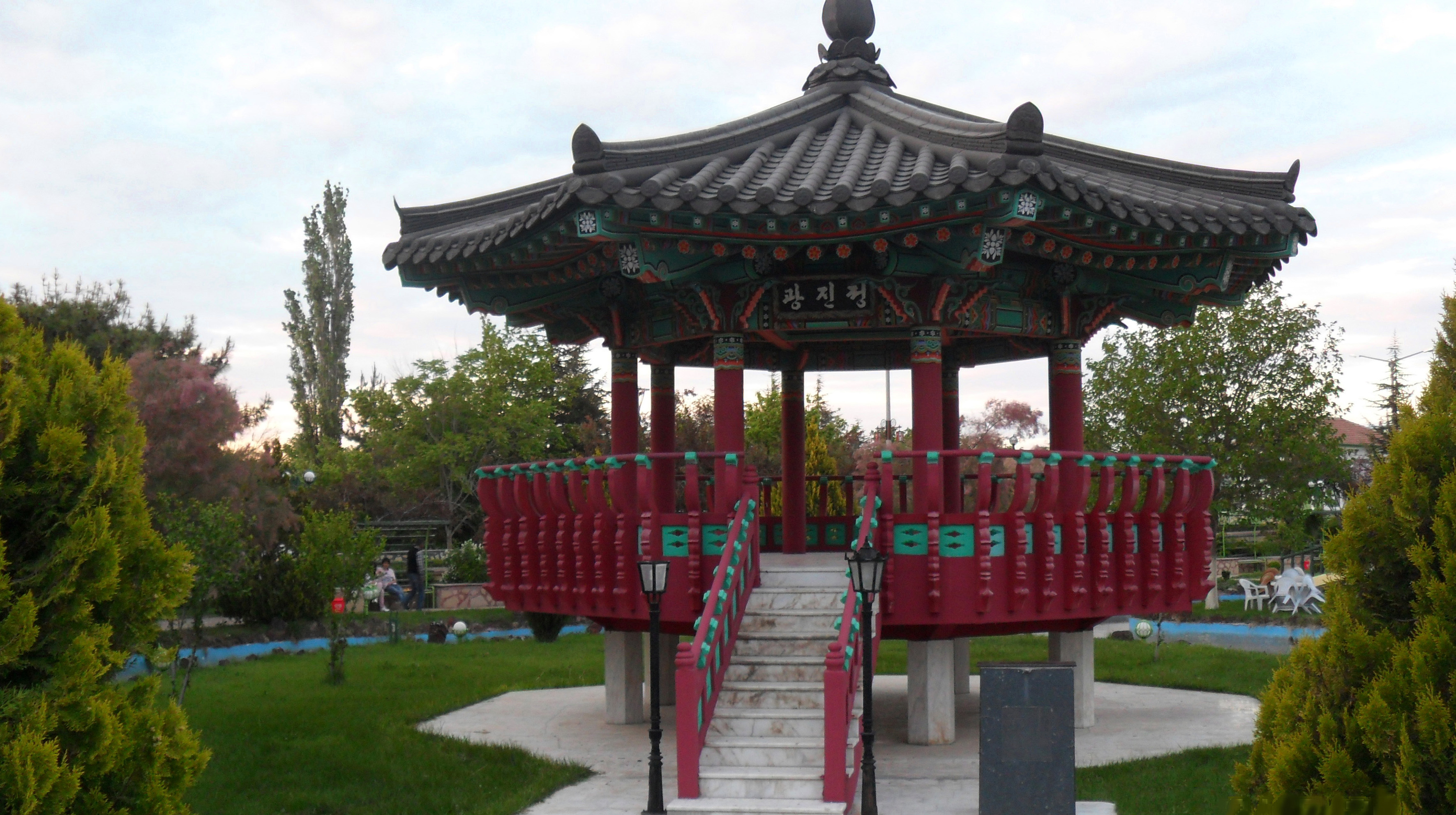
- Summer house
- Interactive map of Kwangjin Park
- Location: Ereğli, Konya Province, Turkey
- Coordinates: 37°30′N 34°03′E
- Created: October 6, 2002; 23 years ago

Kwangjin Parkı, or Kwangjin Dostluk Parkı, (English: Kwangjin Friendship Park) is an urban recreational area in Ereğli district of Konya Province, Turkey. The park was established jointly by the municipalities of Ereğli and its South Korean sister city Gwangjin on 16 October 2002. In the inscription of the park it reads:

This part has been established within the scope of friendship and cooperation protocol of Kwangjin and Ereğli cities to evoke the historical friendship between the Korean and Turkish nations eternally.
(Signed by Yeung Sup Chung, mayor of Kwangjin and Aydın Selay mayor of Ereğli)

Being one of the excursion areas of the city, it is situated to the west of the train station at 37°30′N 34°03′E. There is also a wedding-ceremony hall in the park. A summer house built in Korean style is situated at the center of the park.
