= Bereket railway station (Turkey) =

Railway station in Turkey

KARALAR

General information
- Location: Bereket Köyü 51700; Bor, Niğde; Turkey
- Coordinates: 37.7570°N 34.5294°E
- System: TCDD Taşımacılık intercity rail station
- Owner: Turkish State Railways
- Operator: TCDD Taşımacılık
- Line: Erciyes Express
- Platforms: 1 side platform
- Tracks: 1

Construction
- Structure type: At-grade
- Parking: Yes

Services
Preceding station	TCDD Taşımacılık	Following station
Karalar towards Adana	Erciyes Express	Kemerhisar towards Kayseri
Location

Bereket railway station (Turkish: Bereket istasyonu) is a railway station near the village of Bereket in the Niğde Province of Turkey. The station consists of a side platform serving one track, with two more tracks as sidings. The station is located 3.4 km (2.1 mi) northwest of Bereket and is used primarily as a siding to allow trains to pass.

TCDD Taşımacılık operates a daily intercity train, the Erciyes Express, from Kayseri to Adana.
