= Burçak Tarlası =

Melody in Turkish

Song by Tülay German
- Language: Turkish
- Released: 1964
- Genre: Pop; Arranged türkü Kasik Havasi
- Label: Ezgi
- Songwriter(s): Kör Şakir

Burçak Tarlası (literally "Vetch Field") is the arranged form of a Turkish folkloric tune (türkü) and it is one of the pioneers in Turkish pop music. There are similar folkloric dance tunes known as "Ka mi ispadnala moma Katerina" in North Macedonia, and "Στην Αγιά Μαρκέλλα" in Greece. However, "Burçak Tarlası" is based on a tragic real-life story.

== Original form ==
The original form of the türkü was popular in Central Anatolia . It was probably composed by a folk poet known as Kör Şakir (Şakir the Blind) in 1931. According to unconfirmed stories, the lyrics refer to Meryem Sayar a newly wed woman who complains from her mother in law. Her mother in law who was the wife of a late muhtar of Zengen village ( Konya Province) wakes her up very early in the mornings and forces her to work hard in the vetch fields. In one couplet she complaints:

Aman da kızlar ne zor imiş burçak yolması
Burçak tarlasında yar yar gelin olması.

Oh Girls how hard it is to tear up vetch,
(And) to be a bride in a vetch field.

== Arranged form ==
In 1964, this song was arranged to be played in modern instruments. Tülay German, hitherto a jass singer accompanied by the Donuk Onatkut orchestra played the melody. The result was a big success. Burçak Tarlası was not only a hit. According to one view by this melody, the first seeds of Anatolian rock had been disseminated.

== Record ==
Tülay German released "Burçak Tarlası" as a 45 rpm (on Ezgi Records). The reverse side of the record she sang another arranged türkü: "Mecnunum Leylamı Gördüm".

== See also ==
- Ballos
- Syrtos
- Cerkez kizi
- Bir tas attim kamisa
