= Tülay German =

Turkish singer (born 1935)

- Also known as: Toulaï
- Born: January 27, 1935 (age 91); Istanbul, Turkey
- Origin: Turkey
- Genres: Anatolian rock, türkü, jazz
- Occupations: Singer, musician, writer
- Years active: 1962–1987
- Labels: Ezgi, Philips, Arion, Kalan

Tülay German (born 27 January 1935), also known as Toulaï, is a Turkish singer, currently living in France. She is known for her modern interpretations of Turkish folk music.

== Early years ==
Tülay German was born in Istanbul in 1935; she was the only child of her father, a civil servant, and her mother, a housewife. She began singing Turkish classical music at the age of four and during her primary school years performed Franz Schubert's Ständchen (a.k.a. Serenade) and Abends unter der Linde on radio.

Belkıs Aran, a well-known soprano of that time, secretly took the young Tülay to a German music teacher, who declared her an exceptional vocal talent. Although she did study piano formally for five years with Ferdi Statzer, her parents did not wish to send her to conservatory; instead she attended Üsküdar American Academy in İstanbul, from which she graduated in 1956.

== Career ==
=== In Turkey ===
When her father's professional duties brought the family to Ankara for brief periods, German wanted to go sing in night clubs there. Although her father refused to allow this, German would secretly slip out while her father was sleeping and began to regularly perform English and Spanish songs at a night club. Eventually, when German was 25 years old, a friend of her father discovered her singing in the night club and told her father of it, after which he immediately sent German away to Istanbul.

Eventually, in Istanbul, German obtained her father's consent to pursue a musical career, and between 1960 and 1962, she made a name for herself as a jazz singer and began performing on weekly programs featuring the Salim Ağırbaş Quintet on Radio Istanbul. During this time she met her life partner Erdem Buri, a jazz performer and band leader who had achieved prominence in the 1940s, and had then become known for his radio talk shows on jazz in the 1950s. Buri encouraged German to sing folk songs in Turkish instead of foreign language songs, and she began performing on his radio program "Polyphonic Turkish Popular Music" (Turkish: Çoksesli Türk Popüler Müziği), helping to build a new repertory of works by renowned folk musicians and poets such as Ruhi Su, Melih Cevdet Anday and Yalçın Tura.

Having been named "Best Singer" by the critics for her performance at the 1964 Balkan Melodies Festival held in Yugoslavia, German earned an appearance on the cover of the magazine "Arena". At this time, she released her single Burçak Tarlası, widely acknowledged to be one of the first hits of Turkish pop music.

=== Emigration to France ===
In 1966, Buri was threatened with a 15-year prison sentence, ostensibly for having made Turkish translations of Georg W.F. Hegel's Dialectic and Science of Logic, works considered subversive in the Cold War climate of the time. Fleeing political repression, Buri and German emigrated to France, settling permanently in Paris.

Embarking on a new phase of her career as an expatriate artist, German adopted the French stage name "Toulaï". She recorded ten singles in French, gave numerous solo concerts, as well as appearing alongside renowned artists such as Charles Aznavour, Léo Ferré and The Moody Blues. She also hosted radio and television programs in France, Germany, Poland, Tunisia, Morocco, Netherlands and Brazil.

Transcending traditional boundaries of genre, German's love songs and folk ballads established her reputation as an innovator of the 1960 and 1970s folk and jazz world. In 1981 her Turkish-language album (recorded in France) was awarded the Grand Prix du Disque of Académie Charles Cros. German's final album was titled Nazım Hikmet'e Saygı (Respect to Nazım Hikmet).

After a farewell concert in the Netherlands in 1987, Tülay German retired from performing. Since the death of her partner Erdem Buri on January 2, 1993, German has retired from public life.

== Works ==
=== Discography ===
Selected singles

- Summertime, 1962 (Odeon)
- Burçak Tarlası/Mecnunum Leylam'ı gördüm, 1964 (Ezgi)
- Yarının Şarkısı/Kızılcıklar Oldu mu?, 1965 (Ezgi)
- La Chanson De L'oubli / Le Coeur D'un Ange, 1967 (Philips)
- O Eski Günler / Sevmem Bir Daha, 1968 (Philips)
- C'Est Joli De S'Aimer / Kumbaya, 1968 (Philips)
- Dere Geliyor Dere / Kara Kızın Türküsü, 1968 (Philips)
- Aras Üste Buz Üste / Seni Alıp Kaçayım, 1968 (Philips)
- Mara Eva, 1970 (Philips)
- Maria Isabelle/ J'avais 10 petits frères (Philips)
- A Perdre Haleine (for Janis Joplin)/ L'Homme Est Un Bateau, 1972 (CBS)

Albums

- Tract: A composition of Agitprop Music for Electromagnetic tape (with İlhan Mimaroğlu), 1975 (Folkways)
- Toulaï et François Rabbath, 1980 (Arion)
- Günlerimiz (with Zülfü Livaneli), 1980.
- Hommage à Nâzım Hikmet (with François Rabbath), 1982 (Arion)
- La Turquie de Mehmet Koç, 1985 (Arion).

Compilations (CD)

- Le Chant Des Poètes (with François Rabbath), 1998 (Arion)
- Yunus'tan Nâzım'a (with François Rabbath), 1999 (Kalan)
- '62 - '87 Burçak Tarlası, 2001 (Kalan)
- Sound of Love, 2007 (Kalan)

=== Bibliography ===
- Tülay German (1996). Erdemli Yıllar (in Turkish). Bilgi Yayınevi. p. 200. ISBN 975-494-563-2.
- Tülay German (2001). Düşmemiş Bir Uçağın Kara Kutusu (in Turkish). Çınar Yayınları. p. 237. ISBN 978-975-348-153-3.

== Legacy ==
- The 2010 documentary movie, Tülay German: Kor ve Ateş Yılları (literally: Tülay German: Years of Fire and Cinders), describes her life and music.

- "Mecnunum Leylamı Gördüm" is a part of the soundtrack of the 2009 Pelin Esmer's movie, 11'e 10 Kala/10 to 11.
