= Çayhan, Konya =

Çayhan
- Neighbourhood
- Location in Turkey Çayhan (Turkey Central Anatolia)
- Coordinates: 37°33′N 34°18′E
- Country: Turkey
- Province: Konya
- District: Ereğli
- Elevation: 1,285 m (4,216 ft)
- Population (2022): 1,606
- Time zone: UTC+3 (TRT)
- Area code: 0332

Çayhan is a neighbourhood of the municipality and district of Ereğli, Konya Province, Turkey. Its population is 1,606 (2022). Before the 2013 reorganisation, it was a town (belde). It is situated on the northern slopes of Toros Mountains. Distance to Ereğli is 25 kilometres (16 mi) and to Konya is 185 kilometres (115 mi). The town was established in 1967.
