= Zengen, Ereğli =

Zengen
- Neighbourhood
- Location in Turkey Zengen (Turkey Central Anatolia)
- Coordinates: 37°49′25″N 34°13′43″E
- Country: Turkey
- Province: Konya
- District: Ereğli
- Elevation: 1,075 m (3,527 ft)
- Population (2022): 1,668
- Time zone: UTC+3 (TRT)
- Area code: 0332

Zengen is a neighbourhood of the municipality and district of Ereğli, Konya Province, Turkey. Its population is 1,668 (2022). Between 1977 and the 2013 reorganisation, it was a town (belde). It is situated to the east of the Turkish state highway D.750. Its distance to Konya is 205 kilometres (127 mi).

== See also ==
- Burçak Tarlası (song)
