= Kayseri railway station =

Railway station in Turkey

KAYSERİ
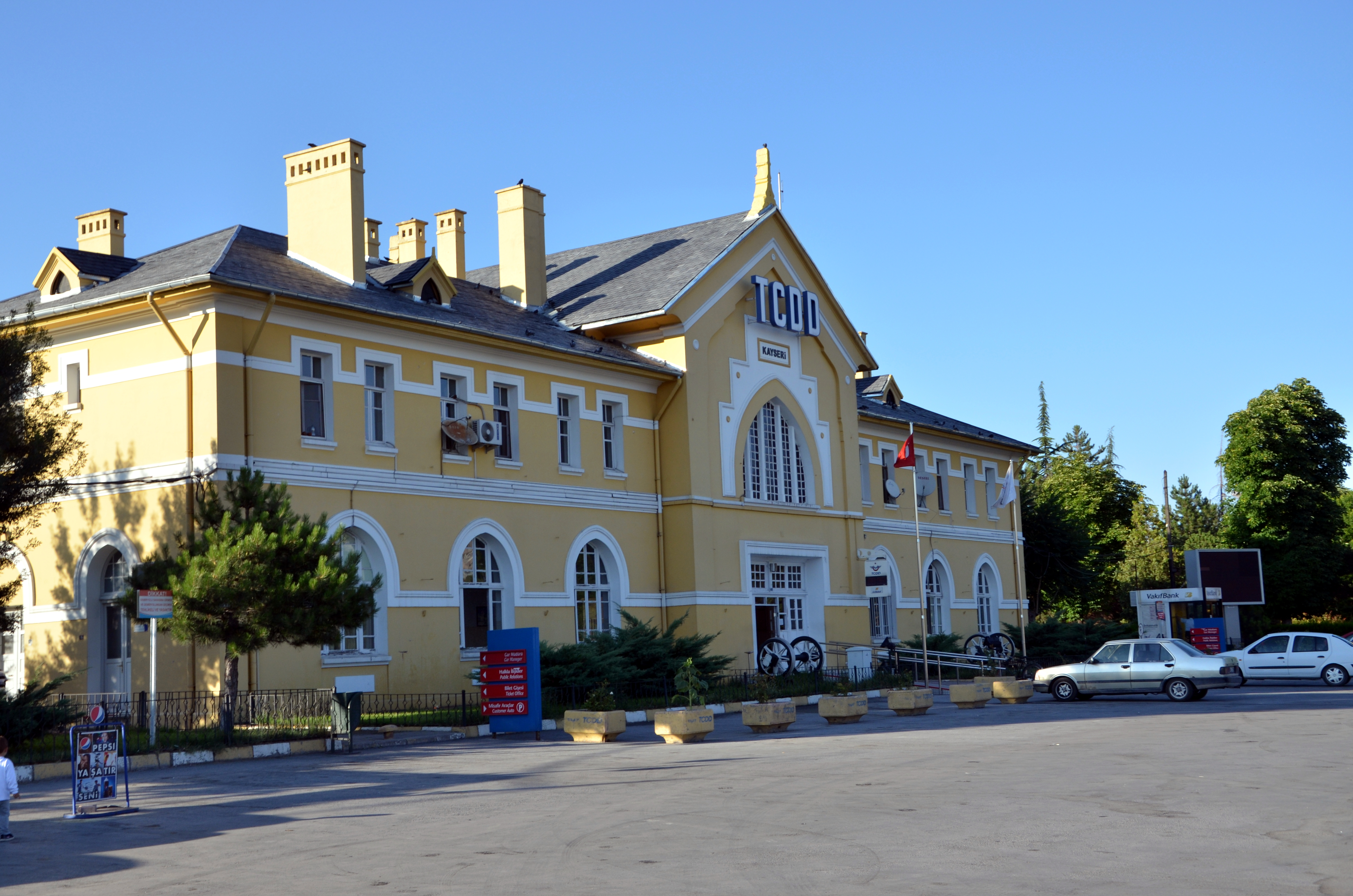
- The station building.

General information
- Location: Depo Cd. İstasyon Mah. 38080; Kocasinan, Kayseri; Turkey
- Coordinates: 38.7304°N 35.4779°E
- System: TCDD Taşımacılık intercity rail station
- Owner: Turkish State Railways
- Operator: TCDD Taşımacılık
- Line: Eastern Express Lake Van Express Southern Express Erciyes Express
- Platforms: 2 (1 island platform, 1 side platform)
- Tracks: 2

Construction
- Parking: Yes
- Accessible: Yes
- Architectural style: Turkish Neoclassical

History
- Opened: 29 May 1927

Services
Preceding station	TCDD Taşımacılık	Following station
Boğazköprü towards Ankara	Eastern Express (Tourist)	Hanlı towards Kars
Boğazköprü towards Ankara	Eastern Express	Sarımsaklı towards Kars
Boğazköprü towards Ankara	Lake Van Express	Sarıoğlan towards Tatvan
Boğazköprü towards Ankara	Southern Express	Sarıoğlan towards Kurtalan
Boğazköprü towards Adana	Erciyes Express	Terminus
Location

Kayseri station is the main station in Kayseri, Turkey. It is on Kocasinan Boulevard in the Kocasinan second level municipality of Kayseri at 38°43′49″N 35°28′41″E.

The station was built in 1927. It is an important junction for those trains to East Anatolia.
