= Taurus Express =

Turkish passenger train

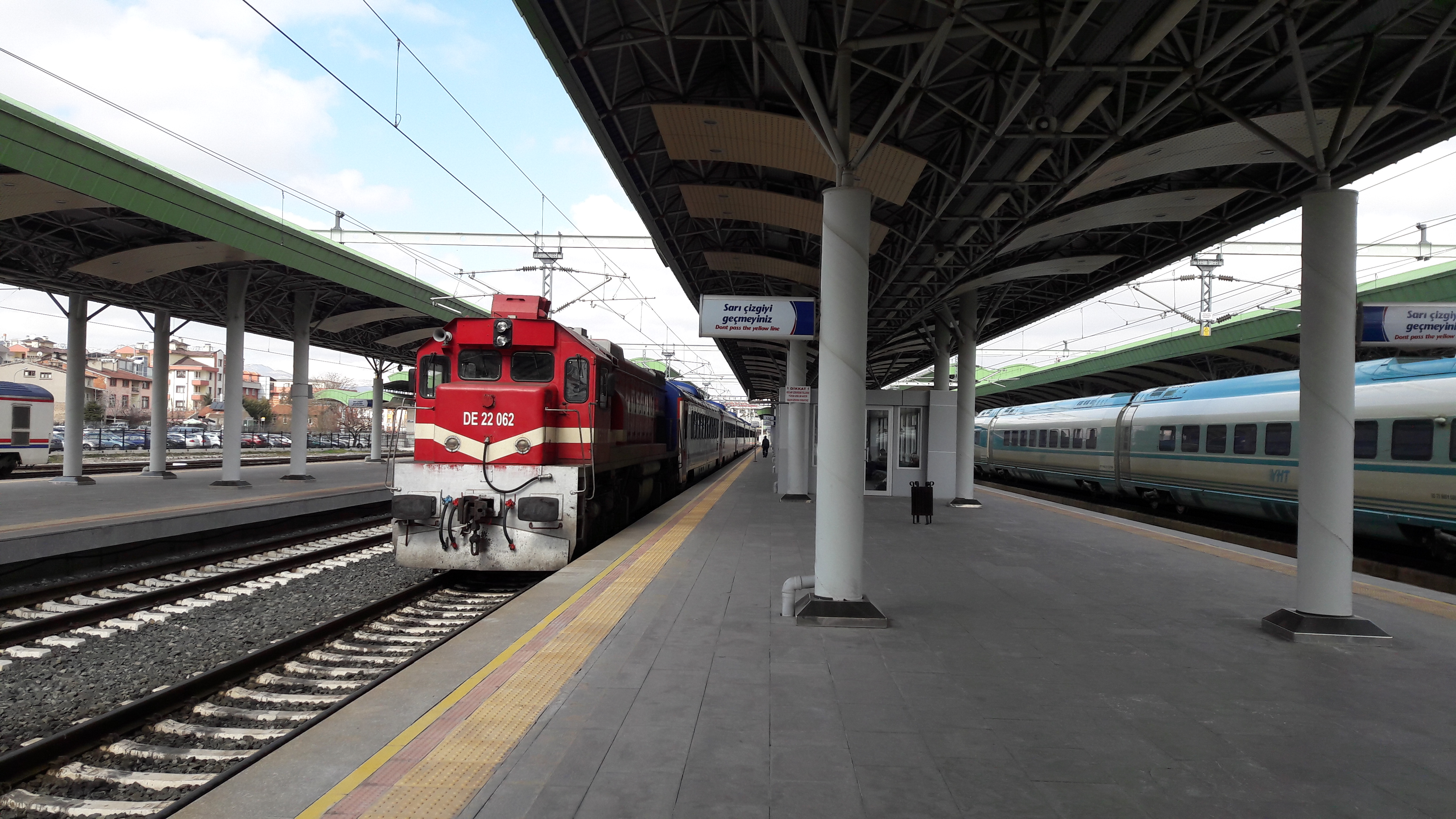
- The southbound Taurus Express waiting to depart Konya station.

Overview
- Service type: Inter-city rail
- Status: Active
- Locale: Interior Anatolia, south Turkey
- Predecessor: CD, CNS
- First service: 1930
- Current operator: Turkish State Railways
- Former operator: Compagnie Internationale des Wagons-Lits

Route
- Termini: Konya Garı, Konya; Adana central railway station, Adana
- Distance travelled: 1,600 kilometers (990 mi)
- Service frequency: Daily

On-board services
- Seating arrangements: Coach or Couchette
- Sleeping arrangements: Private rooms
- Catering facilities: Dining Car
- Baggage facilities: At select stations

Technical
- Track gauge: 4 ft 8 1/2 in (1,435 mm)
- Electrification: Istanbul-Eskişehir (Envirye)
- Track owners: TCDD, CFS, IRR

The Taurus Express (Turkish: Toros Ekspresi) is a passenger train named after the Taurus Mountains in Southern Turkey. It was launched in 1930 by Compagnie Internationale des Wagons-Lits and originally connected Istanbul with Aleppo, Tripoli, Lebanon (for connections to Palestine) and Nusaybin (for connections to Iraq). The Taurus Express provided connection to the Orient Express in Istanbul. Overland travel from Western Europe to Near East became possible with the same level of comfort and quality throughout the trip. As of 2024 a service with this name is operated daily by TCDD Transport running wholly within Turkey between Konya and Adana.

== History ==
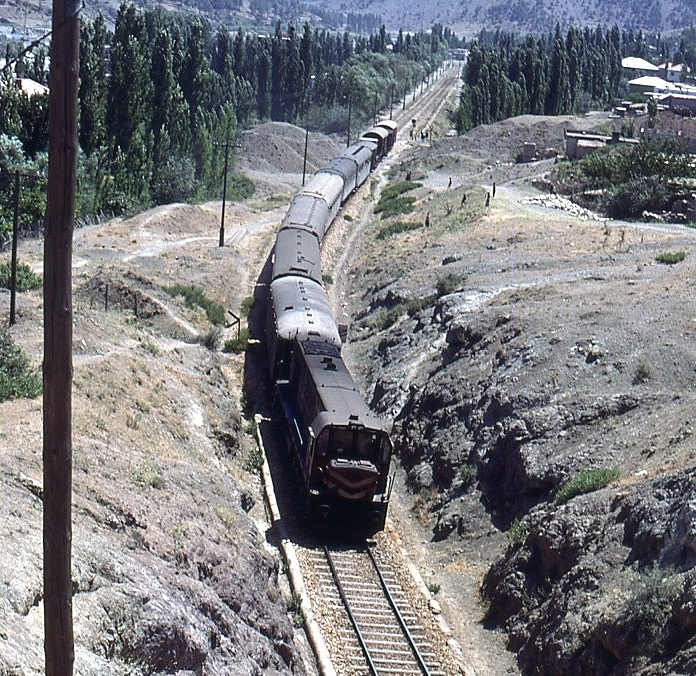
The Taurus Express in July 1970.

The historical route of the Taurus Express in 1930

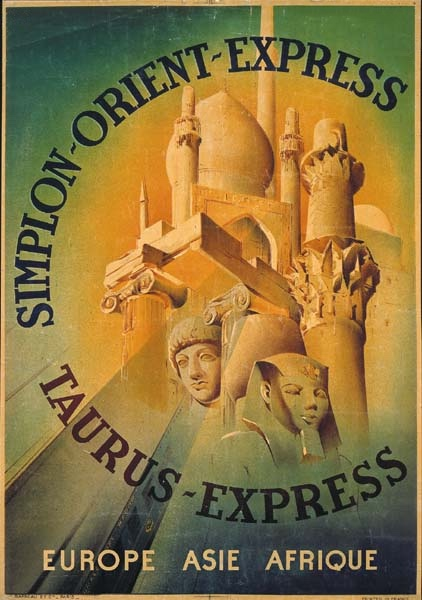
Poster for railways CIWL Orient-Express and Taurus Express.

=== 1930 ===
The Taurus Express ran for the first time on 15 February 1930 from Istanbul to Aleppo and Nusaybin. Passengers for Baghdad had to transfer to a motor coach between Nusaybin and Kirkuk, then continue on the meter-gauge railway between Kirkuk and Baghdad.

=== 1939 ===
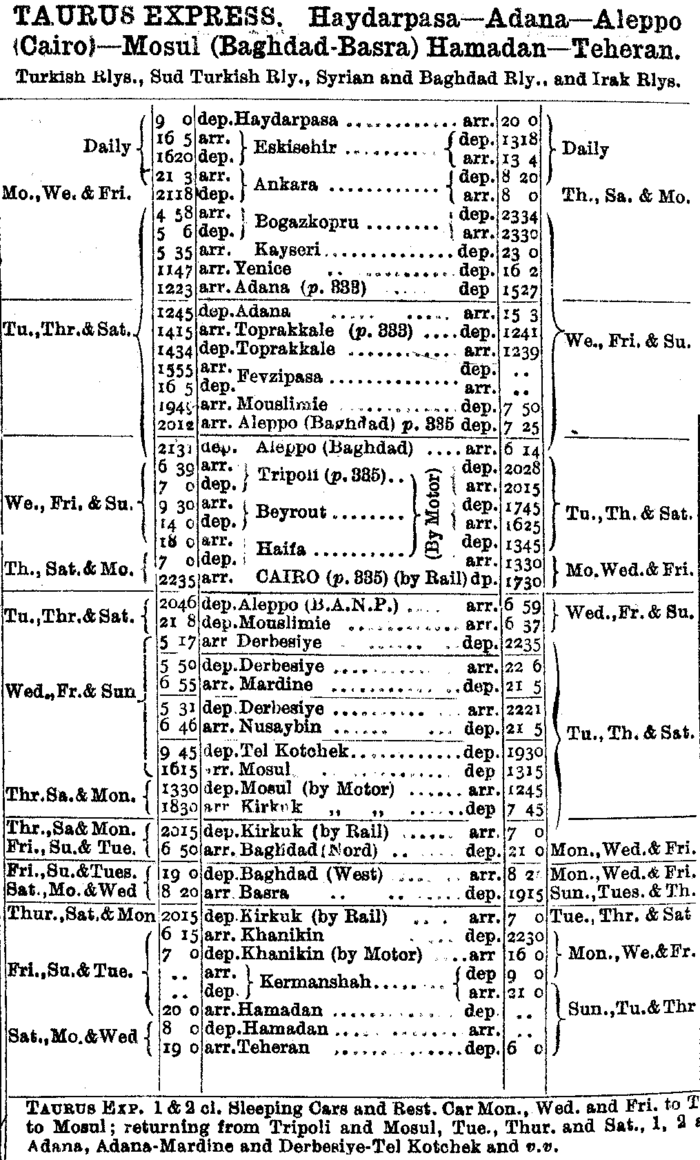
Taurus Express Timetable 1939

In 1939, this service was running three times a week from Istanbul to Aleppo with connections twice a week towards Baghdad, Tehran, Haifa and Cairo.

=== 1940 ===
With the Mosul section of the Baghdad Railway completed in 1940, the first continuous rail journey departed from Istanbul Haydarpaşa on July 17, 1940, and arrived in Baghdad on July 20, 1940.

=== 1942 ===
With the completion of the Tripoli to Haifa railway in December 1942 and the bridge across the Suez canal at Ferdan a direct rail connection from Istanbul to Cairo was possible, appearing on CIWL literature. However, services stopped with the bridge at Ferdan damaged by a steamship and outbreak of war in Israel/Palestine.

=== 1948 ===
The Taurus Express originally ran on tracks owned by the Turkish State Railways, Southern Railways, Northern Syria & Cilician Railways and the Iraqi State Railways. The Turkish State Railways acquired the Southern Railways in 1948.

=== 1960 ===
A new railway line from Gaziantep to Karkamış was opened in 1960, allowing some portions of the Taurus Express to bypass Aleppo.

=== 1965 ===
By 1965, a portion of the Taurus Express was running to Beirut via Aleppo. Civil war in Lebanon ended this service by the mid 1970s.

Also in 1965 ownership of the Northern Syria & Cilician Railways was acquired by Syrian Railways.

=== 1972 ===
After 1972, passengers could travel down to Basra via connection to the Express 2 made at Baghdad Central Station. This replaced the previous metre-gauge service that ran to Basra.

=== 2001 ===
A portion to Aleppo and Damascus was re-added with a Syrian Railways (CFS) sleeping car running weekly to/from Istanbul.

=== 2003 ===
Service to Iraq was suspended in 2003, due to the outbreak of war in Iraq.

=== 2008 ===
The weekly portion to Aleppo last ran in June 2008, interrupted firstly by engineering work in Turkey and later by civil war in Syria from 2011.

=== 2012 ===
In 2012, the State Railways renewed service between Eskişehir and Adana and will once again service Istanbul when track work in the city is complete.

== Consist ==
The consist of the first Taurus Express was this:

- TCDD Steam Loco 3688
- TCDD Baggage Car
- CIWL Sleeping Car
- CIWL Sleeping Car
- TCDD Coach
- TCDD Coach
- TCDD Baggage Car

After 1972 the diesel locomotives were the main power and the consists from 1972 to 2003 were like this:

- IRR DEM 2000 Locomotive (Baghdad-Karkamış)
- TCDD DE 24000 Locomotive (Karkamış-Istanbul)
- TCDD Postage Car
- TCDD Sleeping Car
- TCDD Couchette Car
- TCDD Coach
- TCDD Baggage Car

== In popular culture ==
The Taurus Express is featured in Agatha Christie's crime novel Murder on the Orient Express (1934). While the main body of the story takes place on another of the Compagnie Internationale des Wagons-Lits trains, the Simplon-Orient Express, the opening chapter of the book takes place on the Taurus Express.
