= Casemates of İbrahim Pasha =

Location in Turkey for weapon use

- İbrahim Paşa Tabyaları
- Tarsus, Mersin Province, Turkey
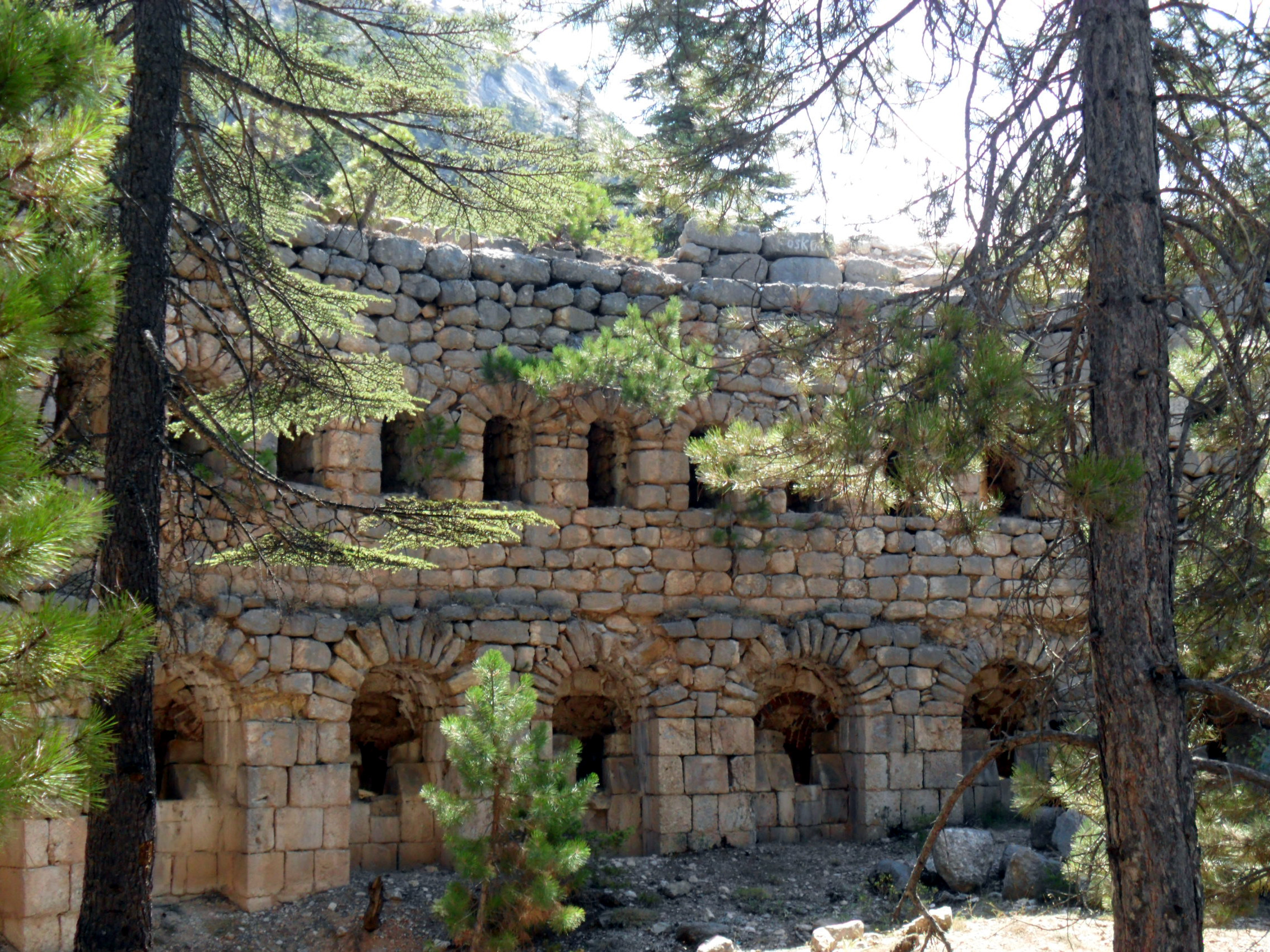
- Aktabya (The east casemate)

Location
- Location of İbrahim Pasha's Casemates in Turkey
- Coordinates: 37°19′44″N 34°46′58″E

Site history
- Built: 1833
- Built by: Ibrahim Pasha of Egypt

The Casemates of Ibrahim Pasha (Turkish: İbrahim Paşa Tabyaları), are a number of casemates built by Ibrahim Pasha of Egypt in 1833 to the north of Gülek Pass in southern Turkey.

== Background ==
Ibrahim Pasha's father Mehmet Ali Pasha of Kavala was a rebellious Ottoman governor in Egypt in the 1830s. He asked for the governorship of Çukurova (Cilicia) in addition to his semi autonomous possessions in Egypt. But he was refused. He revolted and his son Ibrahim Pasha invaded Çukurova. During his brief stay in Çukurova in 1830s, Ibrahim Pasha tried to support the defense of the region by fortifications to the north of Gülek Pass the only gate to Central Anatolia.

== Casemates ==
The casemates are situated at the Toros Mountains almost on the border line between the Tarsus district of Mersin Province and Pozantı district of Adana Province. There are two high castles and several ground emplacements constructed to protect Gülek Pass. One of the castles (Aktabya) is to the southeast of the town Akçatekir. The other one is to the west of Akçatekir and to the north of Gülek town. The ground emplacements are to the south of each castle.

== Transportation ==
The sites are about 1.5 km (0.93 mi) offside from the motorway exit Tekir on the O.21 (Tarsus-Ankara Motorway) or from the state road D.750. At the moment, the historical place is accessible only through walking. It is planned to restore the castles, and provide means of transportation.
