= Caracalla's inscription =

Ancient Roman inscription on the Taurus Mountains in Turkey

Coordinates: 37°17′08″N 34°47′10″E

Caracalla's Inscription
- Material: Stone
- Writing: Latin
- Created: 216 AD
- Present location: Cilician Gates, Taurus Mountains, Turkey

Location of Caracalla's inscription in Turkey

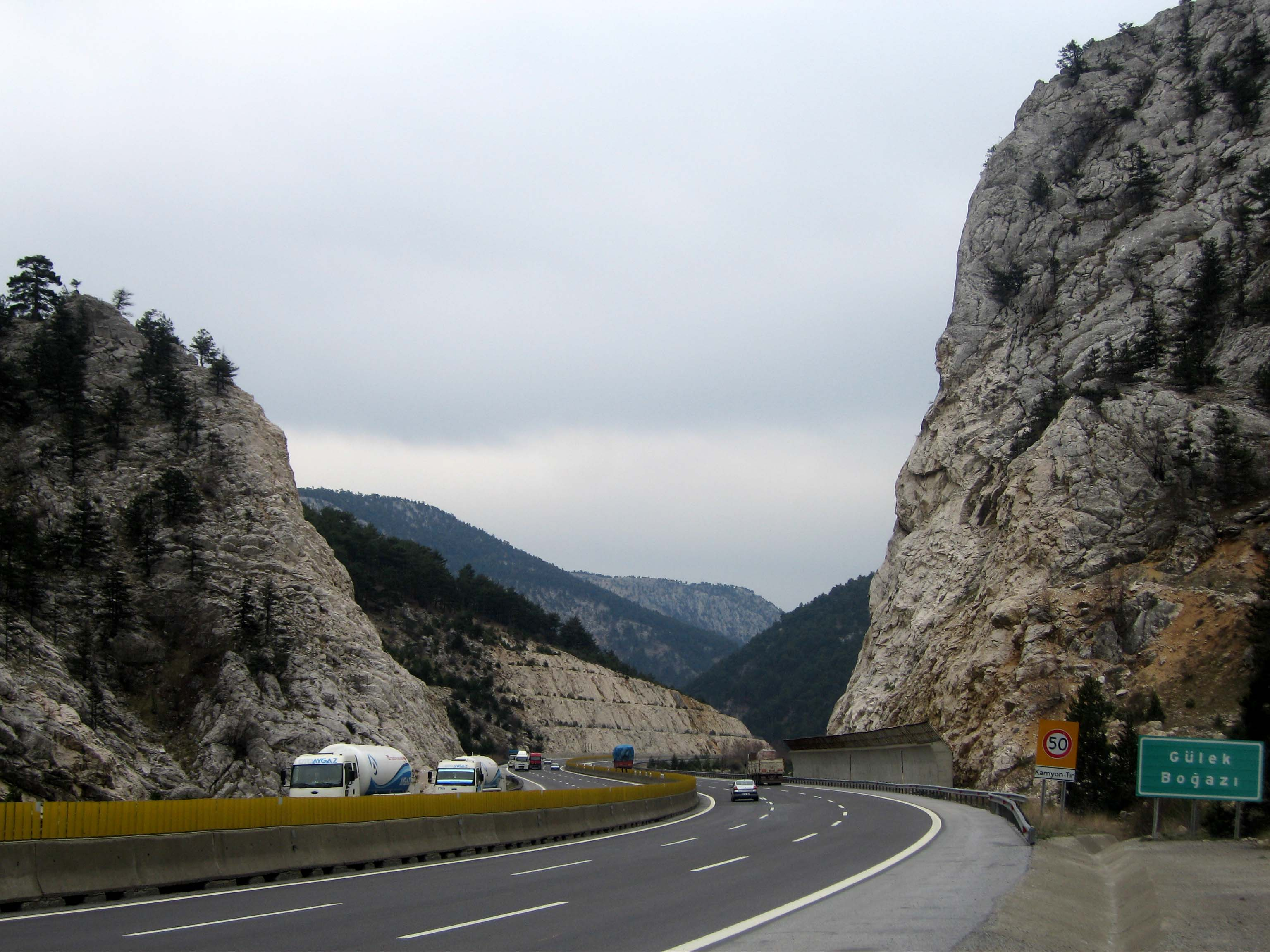
Motorway O.21 at Cilician Gates close to the location of the Caracalla's inscription.

Caracalla's Inscription (Turkish: Gülek Kitabesi, also called İskender Kitabesi) is a rock-carved ancient Roman inscription on the Taurus Mountains, southern Turkey dedicated to the Roman emperor Caracalla.

== Location ==
The inscription is situated at the Cilician Gates (Turkish: Gülek Boğazı), which is located north of Tarsus district in Mersin Province. Formerly visible to the passers-by on the highway, it is not the case today due to the elevated level of the motorway O.21 constructed on place later on.

The location is accessible by a staircase next to the motorway, it is also accessible taking the exit at Akçatekir and following the regional road east of the motorway southwards about 5 km (3.1 mi).

== Etymology of the inscription ==
Locally, it is dubbed as the "İskender Kitabesi" ("Alexander's Inscription"), although Alexander the Great lived about five centuries before Caracalla. The local name was most likely given due to the historical fact that Alexander the Great (reigned 331–323 BC) passed through the Cilician Gates proceeding for the Battle of Issus. Even though it revealed after its decryption that the inscription was dedicated to Caracalla (reigned 198–217 AD), the wrong local name still persists.

== The inscription ==
The inscription was put up to memorize the road-widening construction of the mountain pass for the troops of Caracalla proceeding to the Parthian war in 216–17 AD. The inscription in Latin reads as:

Imp(erator) Ca(e)sar Marcus Au/relius ⟦Antoninus Pi⟧us / Felix Invictus Augu/stus montibus ca<e=I>si[s] / viam latiorem fecit
Emperor Caesar Marcus Antoninus, the faithful, blessed, invincible Augustus (Caracalla), constructed this road by digging through the mountains.

Below the inscription, there are two lines written in Ancient Greek, ὅροι [Κι]λί/κων, which reads as Border of Cilicia marking the border to Cappadocia in the north.

In conjunction with the inscription, there exist several milestones to the north of the Cilician Gates. Some of the milestones are now in Adana Archaeology Museum. The milestones bear the name of the road in Latin as Via Tauri ("Taurus road").

== Destruction of the inscription ==
In 2020, a part of the inscription was destroyed by treasure hunters.
