= Persecution of Muslims during the Ottoman decline =

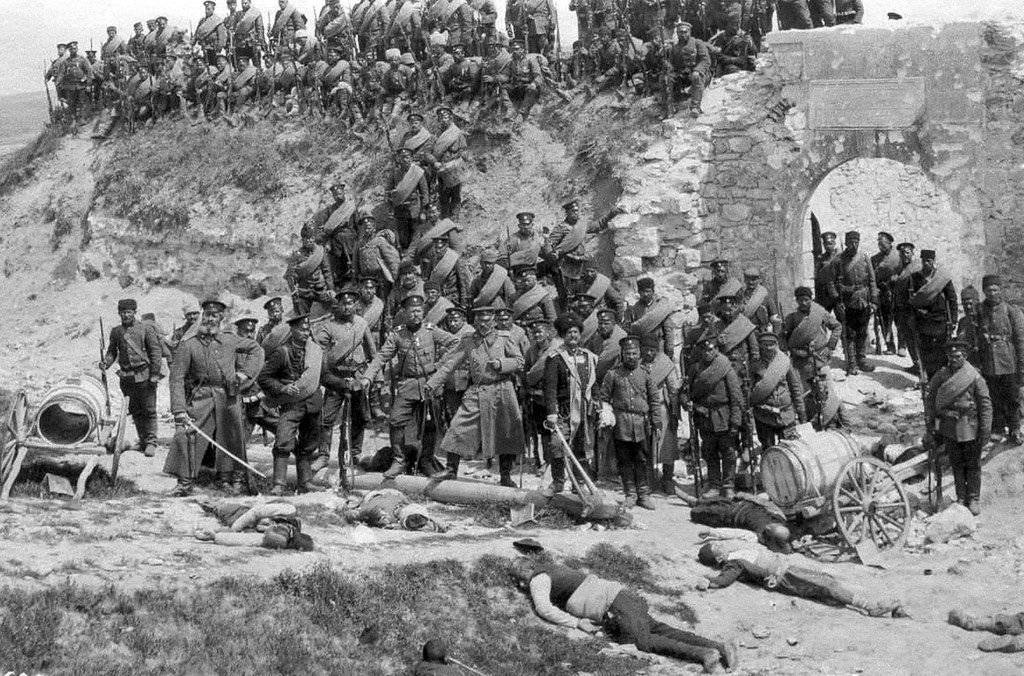
- Bulgarian soldiers pose with dead Turkish civilians, Edirne, 1913
- Location: Former Ottoman territories and the Russian Empire
- Date: 19th and early 20th centuries
- Target: Muslim people (Turks, Kurds, Albanians, Bosniaks, Circassians, Serb Muslims, Greek Muslims, Muslim Roma, Pomaks)
- Attack type: Genocide, religious persecution, expropriation, mass murder, mass rape, and ethnic cleansing
- Deaths: Millions (see below)
- Perpetrators: Various European Christian nations and empires
- Motive: Anti-Muslim sentiment, Christianization and ethnic hatred

During the decline and dissolution of the Ottoman Empire, Muslims living in territories previously under Ottoman control often found themselves persecuted after borders were re-drawn. These peoples included Turks, Kurds, Albanians, Bosnian Muslims, Circassians, Serb Muslims, Greek Muslims, Muslim Roma, and Pomaks. They were subject to genocide, expropriation, massacres, religious persecution, mass rape, and ethnic cleansing.

The 19th century saw the rise of nationalism in the Balkans coincide with the decline of Ottoman power, which resulted in the establishment of an independent Greece, Serbia, Bulgaria and Romania. At the same time, the Russian Empire expanded into previously Ottoman-ruled or Ottoman-allied regions of the Caucasus and the Black Sea region. These conflicts such as the Circassian genocide created large numbers of Muslim refugees. Persecutions of Muslims resumed during World War I by the invading Russian troops in the east and during the Turkish War of Independence in the west, east, and south of Anatolia by Greek troops and Armenian fedayis. After the Greco-Turkish War, a population exchange between Greece and Turkey took place, and most Muslims of Greece left. During these times many Muslim refugees, called Muhacir, settled in Turkey.

== Background ==
=== The Turkish presence and the Islamisation of native peoples in the Balkans ===
Ottoman military expeditions shifted from Anatolia to Europe and the Balkans for the first time with the occupation of the Gallipoli peninsula in the 1350s. After the region was conquered by the Muslim Ottoman Empire, the Turkish presence grew. Some of the settlers were Yörüks, nomads who quickly became sedentary, and others were from urban classes. They settled in almost all of the towns, but the majority of them settled in the Eastern Balkans. The main areas of settlement were Ludogorie, Dobruja, the Thracian plain, the mountains and plains of northern Greece and Eastern Macedonia around the Vardar river.

Between the 15th and 17th centuries, large numbers of native Balkan peoples were forcibly converted to Islam. Places of mass conversions were in Bosnia, Albania, North Macedonia, Kosovo, Crete, and the Rhodope Mountains. Some of the native population converted to Islam and became Turkish over time, mainly in Anatolia.

=== Motives for the persecution ===
Hall points out that atrocities were committed by all sides during the Balkan conflicts. Deliberate terror was designed to instigate population movements out of particular territories. The aim of targeting the civilian population was to carve ethnically homogeneous countries.

== Great Turkish War ==
Even before the Great Turkish War (1683–1699) Austrians and Venetians supported Christian irregulars and rebellious highlanders of Herzegovina, Montenegro and Albania to raid Muslim Slavs.

The end of the Great Turkish War marked the first time the Ottoman Empire lost large areas of territory in Europe to Christians. Most of Hungary, Croatia, Dalmatia, Slavonia, Montenegro, Podolia and the Morea were lost, and the Muslim minorities were killed, enslaved, or expelled to Muslim-ruled lands such as Bosnia. The Ottomans regained the Morea quickly, and Muslims soon became part of the population or were never thoroughly displaced in the first place.

Most of the Christians who lived in the Ottoman Empire were Orthodox and so Russia was particularly interested in them. In 1711 Peter the Great invited Balkan Christians to revolt against Ottoman Muslim rule.

=== Habsburg Empire ===
In 1697, Prince Eugene of Savoy's troops took advantage of a weakened Ottoman military presence in Europe and penetrated into Ottoman Bosnia, where they reached the capital city of Sarajevo. On 23 October, the Habsburg troops set fire to the city, which quickly spread out of control and scorched most of the city. Most mosques were burnt to the ground, and the majority of the imams and muezzins burned to death in the flames as well. Only a few mosques and a church reportedly survived the inferno. The city's Catholic population were evacuated alongside the Habsburg forces, who retreated from Bosnia on 25 October. They resettled in Slavonia, then a part of the imperial realm. The city took nearly two centuries to recover, still having less than half the pre-1697 population into the early 19th century.

After the Siege of Pécs, local Muslims were forced to convert to Catholicism between 1686 and 1713, or left the region. The city of Hatvan became a haven for Turkish merchants and became a majority-Muslim settlement, but after it fell to the Hungarian troops in 1686, all Turkish settlers were forcibly expelled and their holdings in the city became property of foreign mercenaries that fought in the Liberation of Buda.

About one quarter of all people living in Slavonia in the 16th century were Muslims who mostly lived in towns, with Osijek and Požega being the largest Muslim settlements. Professor Mitja Velikonja explains that Muslims and non-Slavs who lived in Hungary, Croatia (Lika and Kordun) and Dalmatia, had fled to Bosnia-Herzegovina, following the loss of the occupied territories in these regions after the Habsburg-Ottoman war of 1683–1699. Velikonja states that it was considered the first example of cleansing of the Muslim population in the area that "enjoyed the benediction of the Catholic Church". Around 130,000 Muslims from Croatia and Slavonia were driven to Ottoman Bosnia and Herzegovina.

Basically, all Muslims who lived in Croatia, Slavonia and Dalmatia left or were exiled, killed or enslaved by the Habsburg and Venetian conquests.

Thousands of Serb refugees crossed the Danube and populated the territories of Habsburg Monarchy left by Muslims. Leopold I granted ethno-religious autonomy to them without giving any privileges to the remaining Muslim population who therefore fled to Bosnia, Herzegovina and Serbia spreading anti-Christian sentiment among other Muslims there. The relations between non-Muslim and Muslim population of Ottoman held Balkans became progressively worse.

In the early 18th century, the remaining Muslims of Slavonia moved to Bosnian Posavina. The Ottoman authorities encouraged hopes of expelled Muslims for a quick return to their homes and settled them in the border regions.

The Muslims were two thirds of the population of Lika. Like the Muslims who lived in the rest of Croatia, they were forced to convert to Catholicism or be expelled. Almost all Ottoman buildings were destroyed in Croatia, after the Ottomans left.

=== Northern Bosnia ===
In 1716, Austria occupied northern Bosnia and northern Serbia until 1739, when those lands were ceded back to the Ottoman Empire at the Treaty of Belgrade. During this era, the Austrian Empire outlined its position to the Bosnian Muslim population about living within its administration. Two options were offered by Charles VI: conversion to Christianity, retaining property and remaining on Austrian territory or a departure of the remaining Muslim to other lands.

=== Montenegro ===
At the beginning of the 18th century (1709 or 1711), Orthodox Serbs massacred their Muslim neighbors in Montenegro.

== National movements ==
=== Serbian Revolution ===
After the Dahije, renegade janissaries who defied the Sultan and ruled the Sanjak of Smederevo in tyranny (beginning in 1801), imposing harsh taxes and forced labour, went on to execute leading Serbs throughout the sanjak in 1804, the Serbs rose up against the Dahije. The revolt, known as the First Serbian Uprising, subsequently reached national level after the quick success of the Serbs. The Porte, seeing the Serbs as a threat, ordered their disbandment. The revolutionaries took over Belgrade in 1806 where an armed uprising against a Muslim garrison, including civilians, took place. During the uprising urban centers with sizeable Muslim populations were violently targeted such as Užice and Valjevo, as the Serbian peasantry held a class hatred of the urban Muslim elite. In the end, Serbia became an autonomous country and most of the Muslims were expelled. During the revolts 15,000–20,000 Muslims fled or were expelled. In Belgrade and the rest of Serbia there remained a Muslim population of some 23,000 who were also forcibly expelled after 1862, following a massacre of Serbian civilians by Ottoman soldiers near Kalemegdan. Some Muslim families then migrated and resettled in Bosnia, where their descendants today reside in urban centres such as Šamac, Tuzla, Foča and Sarajevo.

=== Greek Revolution ===
In 1821, a major Greek revolt broke out in Southern Greece. Insurgents gained control of most of the countryside while the Muslims and Jews sheltered themselves in the fortified towns and castles. Each one of them was besieged and gradually through starvation or surrender most were taken over by the Greeks. In the massacres of April 1821 some 15,000 were killed. The worst massacre happened in Tripolitsa some 8,000 Muslims and Jews died. In response, massive reprisals against Greeks in Constantinople, Smyrna, Cyprus, and elsewhere, took place; thousands were killed and the Ottoman Sultan even considered a policy of total extermination of all Greeks in the Empire. In the end an independent Greece was set up. Most of the Muslims in its area had been killed or expelled during the conflict. British historian William St Clair argues that what he calls "the genocidal process" ended when there were no more Turks to kill in what would become independent Greece.

=== Bulgarian uprising ===
In 1876 a Bulgarian uprising broke out in dozens of villages. The first attacks were made against the local Muslims but in a short time the Ottomans violently suppressed the uprising.

From 1876 until 1989, Muslims from Bulgaria (Turks, Tatars, Pomaks and Muslim Roma) were expelled to Turkey; such as during the Russo-Turkish War (1877–1878), Balkan Wars (1912–1913), and the 1989 expulsion of Turks from Bulgaria.

== Russo-Turkish war ==
=== Bulgaria ===
The Bulgarian uprising eventually lead to a war between Russia and the Ottomans. Russia invaded the Ottoman Balkans through Dobruja and northern Bulgaria, attacking the Muslim population. Russia led a coalition consisting of itself, the Bulgarian Legion, Romania, Serbia, Montenegro, as well as the Guard of Finland. Despite some initial resistance, the Ottoman forces were ultimately heavily defeated and lost ground rapidly. By March 1878, the Ottoman military collapsed and was forced to sue for peace.

As coalition forces advanced, they began to commit large-scale atrocities against the Muslim population in the areas they operated in. As a result, it is estimated that up to 400,000 Muslim civilians were massacred from 1877 to 1878, and up to 500,000–1.5 million were displaced and/or became refugees.

British reports from the period contain information on the massacres. According to these reports, 96 of the 170 houses and schools in the Turkish village of Issova Bâlâ (Upper Isssova) were burned. It is stated that the Muslims of the village of Upper Sofular were massacred, before that, the school and the mosque of the town were burned.

18 Turks were killed and their bodies were burned in the village of Kozluca.

According to Ottoman reports, Muslims were also massacred in the town of Kızanlık, 400 of them were murdered by a group of Russians and Bulgarians. The Cossacks killed around 300 Muslim men after torturing them in various ways. As elsewhere, the Russians first collected the weapons of Muslims. Then they distributed these weapons to the Bulgarians. The Bulgarians then massacred the Muslims with these weapons.

The Russian soldiers, who entered the houses under the pretext of searching in the first days of the occupation, took whatever they found valuable. Especially after the Russian army withdrew, the city was completely left to Cossacks and Bulgarians. They brutally killed the Muslims in the Taşköy and Topraklık villages.

It is worth noting that in several instances, the Russians, under pressure from foreign generals, would not directly carry out massacres themselves, but rather would leave it to the battle-hardened Cossacks and Bulgarian militia.

The towns of Tulça, Ishakça and Mecidiye were occupied by the coalition army in late June. Weapons were distributed to the Bulgarian villagers, who then began to mass murder the Muslims. People were killed, houses, villages were looted and burned. The situation was also no different in Ruscuk and Tırnova.

According to the information given by the British consuls and journalists in the region, the Cossacks surrounded the villages and took the weapons of the locals, then distributed the weapons to the Bulgarians, who then murdered and raped the Muslim-Turkish inhabitants of the area. Those who tried to escape were throw into the fire of the burning villages. Again, neither men, women nor children were spared. In the village of Balvan, for example, 1,900 Muslims were killed in this way. As the Russians entered Eski Zagora on 22 July. They killed 1,100 Muslims in 11 days. British Consul Blunt set off from Edirne on 26 September, visited the Turkish villages in the region and came to Yeni Zağra on 28 September, and then moved to Kızanlık. He wrote that all the villages except a Bulgarian village on his way were burned and emptied. For example, the entire village of Kadirbey, with 400–500 Muslim people, was laid waste to by the Bulgarians. In his report dated 25 July 1877, the British deputy consul Dupuis reported that the Russians and Bulgarians killed the entire Muslim people of Kalofer and Karlova, old people, women and children alike in cold blood.

Russians and Bulgarians not only killed Muslims in the places they occupied, they raped women and young girls and looted their property. They also burned down their houses and destroyed them. For example, when Old Zagora was occupied, the city's shops and houses belonging to Muslims and Jews were first looted, then destroyed. When Plovdiv was occupied, of the 15,000 Muslims that inhabited it previously, only 100 remained.

When Burgas was occupied, the Turkish neighborhood of the city consisted of 400 houses, it was completely destroyed. When Sofia was occupied, there were less than 50 Turkish families left in the city. Turkish houses were systematically annihilated. Tatar Pazarcık was destroyed in the same way.

Bulgarian peasants were promised the lands, houses and goods owned by the Muslim-Turkish peoples. As a matter of fact, as a result of this, in a very short time, hundreds of thousands of Bulgarians were systematically settled in Turkish houses, evicting their previous owners without mercy. The Russians and Bulgarians also began to relentlessly persecute Muslims and Turks on the religious level. Qu’rans were torn apart, mosques were closed down and demolished, and Muslim dress of both men and women was violated and suppressed.

Muslim women and girls were also sexually violated and raped by the Russians and Bulgarians on a large scale, with some being sent to brothels.

In the report sent to the Ottoman Government by the Tırnova memorandum about the murders and destruction committed by the Russians and Bulgarians during the occupation of Rumelia, it is stated that in the years when the war continued, around 4,770 Turks were massacred in the villages around Tırnova, and 2,120 Turkish houses were burned. The Daily Telegraph newspaper also corroborated this information. According to the paper; "We saw about 3,000 bodies around the Yeni Zağra station, they were all Turkish. It was said that dogs and pigs gnawed spoiled corpses...it was a horrible sight..." The Governor of Plovdiv also reports that all Muslims: men, women and children, were shut in the mosque in the Serhadli and surrounding villages by the Bulgarians, and all of them were massacred by having their throats cut.

The Russians and Bulgarians who occupied Plovdiv on 15 January 1878, plundered the city completely, raped Muslim women and massacred many. Meanwhile, the Bulgarians brutally massacred and tortured the Ottoman soldiers they captured, such as by cutting off their noses, arms and ears.

Even after the war was over, it is reported that from 1879 to 1890, in the former Ottoman Rumelia Eyalet, the Bulgarians continued to systematically "destroy" the Turkish people in the region. In these years, local administrations stood idly by as Muslims were assaulted, and as armed Bulgarians, who took advantage of this situation, began to commit rape against Muslim-Turkish women and girls on a massive scale.

Bulgarians gathered Turkish youth and women from their homes at night in many villages, stripped them of their abayas, drank alcohol and sexually violated them. As a matter of fact, many women who could not accept this situation preferred to jump into water wells in order not to be raped.

=== Serbian–Ottoman Wars (1876–78) ===
On the eve of the outbreak of a second round of hostilities between Serbia and the Ottoman Empire in 1877, a notable Muslim population existed in the districts of Niš, Pirot, Vranje, Leskovac, Prokuplje and Kuršumlija. The rural parts of Toplica, Kosanica, Pusta Reka and Jablanica valleys and adjoining semi-mountainous interior was inhabited by compact Muslim Albanian population while Serbs in those areas lived near the river mouths and mountain slopes and both peoples inhabited other regions of the South Morava river basin. The Muslim population of most of the area was composed out of ethnic Gheg Albanians and with Turks located in urban centres. Part of the Turks were of Albanian origin. The Muslims in the cities of Niš and Pirot were Turkish-speaking; Vranje and Leskovac were Turkish- and Albanian-speaking; Prokuplje and Kuršumlija were Albanian-speaking. There was also a minority of Circassian refugees settled by the Ottomans during the 1860s, near the then border around the environs of Niš. Estimates vary on the size of the Muslim population on the eve of the war within these areas ranging from as high as 200,000 to as low as 131,000. Estimates as to the number of the Albanian or Muslim refugees that left the region for the Ottoman Empire due to the war range from 49 to 130,000, while Serbian claims can be as low as 30,000 Albanian refugees. The departure of the Albanian population from these regions was done in a manner that today would be characterized as ethnic cleansing.

Hostilities between Serbian and Ottoman forces broke out on 15 December 1877, after a Russian request for Serbia to enter the Russo-Turkish war. The Serbian military had two objectives: capturing Niš and breaking the Niš-Sofia Ottoman lines of communication. Serbian forces entered the wider Toplica and Morava valleys capturing urban centres such as Niš, Kuršumlija, Prokuplije, Leskovac, and Vranje and their surrounding rural and mountainous districts. In these regions, the Albanian population depending on the area they resided had fled into nearby mountains, leaving livestock, property and other belongings behind. Some Albanians returned and submitted to Serbian authorities, while others continued their flight southward toward Ottoman Kosovo. Serbian forces also encountered heavy Albanian resistance in certain areas which slowed their advance into these regions resulting in having to take villages one by one that became vacant. A small Albanian population remained the Medveđa area, where their descendants still reside today. The retreat of these refugees toward Ottoman Kosovo was halted at the Goljak Mountains when an armistice was declared. The Albanian population was resettled in Lab area and other parts of northern Kosovo alongside the new Ottoman-Serbian border. Most Albanian refugees were resettled in over 30 large rural settlements in central and southeastern Kosovo and in urban centres that increased their populations substantially. Tensions between Albanian refugees and local Kosovo Albanians arose over resources, as the Ottoman Empire found it difficult to accommodate to their needs and meager conditions. Tensions in the form of revenge attacks also arose by incoming Albanian refugees on local Kosovo Serbs that contributed to the beginnings of the ongoing Serbian-Albanian conflict in coming decades.

=== Bosnia ===
In 1875, a conflict between Muslims and Christians broke out in Bosnia. After the Ottoman Empire signed the treaty at the 1878 Berlin Congress, Bosnia was occupied by Austria-Hungary. Bosnian Muslims (Bosniaks) perceived this as a betrayal by the Ottomans and left on their own, felt that they were defending their homeland and not the wider Empire. From 9 July until 20 October 1878 or for almost three months, Bosnian Muslims resisted Austro-Hungarian forces in nearly sixty military engagements with 5,000 casualties either wounded or killed. Some Bosnian Muslims concerned about their future and well being under the new non-Muslim administration, left Bosnia for the Ottoman Empire. From 1878 until 1918, between 130,000 and 150,000 Bosnian Muslims departed Bosnia to areas under Ottoman control, some to the Balkans, others to Anatolia, the Levant and Maghreb. Today, these Bosnian populations in the Arab world have become assimilated although they have retained memories of their origins and some bear the ethnonym Bosniak (rendered in Arabic as Bushnak) as a surname.

=== Circassia ===
The Russo-Circassian War was the 101-year-long military conflict between Circassia and Russia. Circassia was de jure part of the Ottoman Empire but de facto independent. The conflict started in 1763, when the Russian Empire attempted to establish hostile forts in Circassian territory and quickly annex Circassia, followed by the Circassian refusal of the annexation; only ending 101 years later when the last resistance army of Circassia was defeated on 21 May 1864, making it exhausting and casualty heavy for the Russian Empire as well as being the single longest war Russia ever waged in history.

The end of the war saw the Circassian genocide take place (Note: The Ottoman Empire accepted to harbour the Muslim Circassians who were exiled during the Circassian genocide, 800,000–1,500,000 Circassians (at least 75% of the total population) were exiled to Ottoman territory. Smaller numbers ended up in neighbouring Persia. During the process, the Russian and Cossack forces used various brutal methods to entertain themselves and scare off the native Circassians, such as eviscerating pregnant women and removing the fetuses inside, then feeding them to dogs. Russian generals such as Nikolai Yevdokimov and Grigory Zass allowed their soldiers to rape Circassian girls as young as eight years old.) in which Imperial Russia aimed to systematically destroy the Circassian people where several war crimes were committed by the Russian forces and up to 1.5 million Circassians were killed or expelled to the Middle East, especially modern-day Turkey. Russian generals such as Grigory Zass described the Circassians as "subhuman filth", and justified their killing and use in scientific experiments.

=== South Caucasus ===
The area around Kars was ceded to Russia. This resulted in a large number of Muslims leaving and settling in remaining Ottoman lands. Batum and its surrounding area was also ceded to Russia causing many local Georgian Muslims to migrate to the west "as a result of persecution, or fear of persecution, by Christian Russians." Most of them settled around the Anatolian Black Sea coast.

=== Impact on Europe ===
According to Mark Levene, the Victorian public in the 1870s paid much more attention to the massacres and expulsions of Christians than to massacres and expulsions of Muslims, even if they were on a greater scale. He further suggests that such massacres were even favoured by some circles. He also argues that the dominant powers, by supporting "nation-statism" at the Congress of Berlin, legitimized "the primary instrument of Balkan nation-building": ethnic cleansing.

== Balkan Wars ==
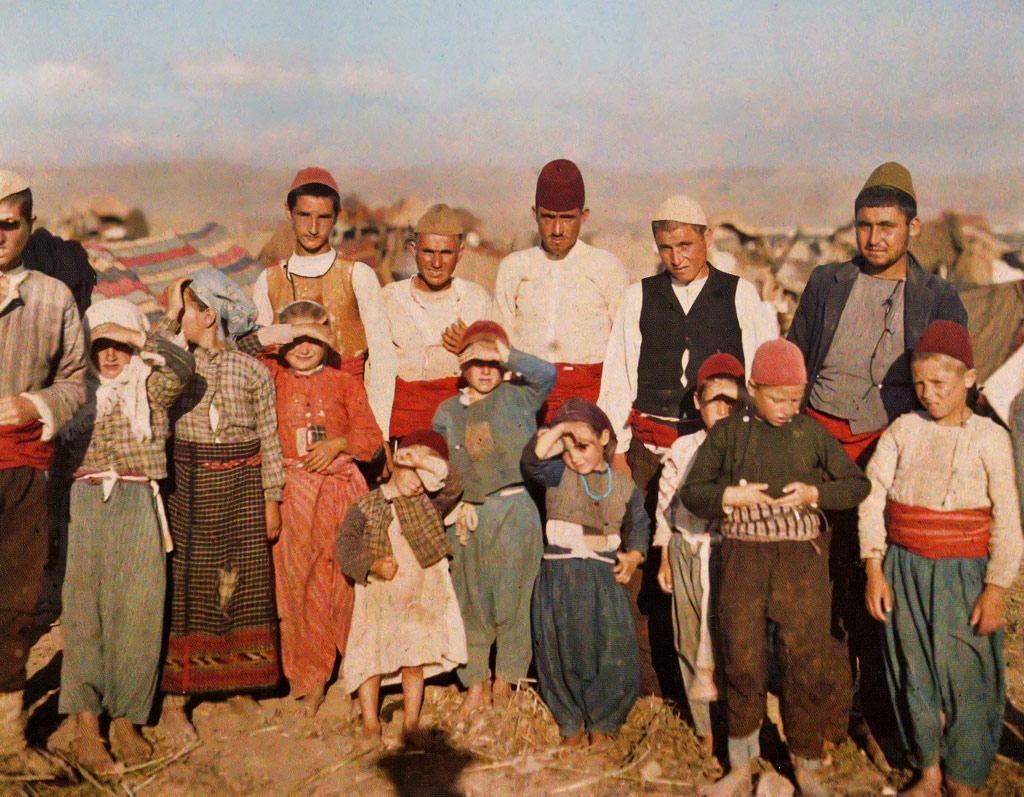
Turkish refugees running from Bulgarian hostilities, First Balkan War, 1913

In 1912 Bulgaria, Serbia, Greece, and Montenegro declared war on the Ottomans. The Ottomans quickly lost territory. According to Geert-Hinrich Ahrens, "the invading armies and Christian insurgents committed a wide range of atrocities upon the Muslim population."

During this war hundreds of thousands of the Turks and Pomaks fled their villages and became refugees. The total number of refugees is estimated to be between 400,000 and 813,000. The death toll is estimated to be between 632,000 and 1,500,000 Ottoman Muslim civilians killed.

In Kosovo and Albania most of the victims were Albanians while in other areas most of the victims were Turks and Pomaks. Approximately 20,000 to 25,000 Albanians were killed in the Kosovo vilayet during the first two to four months of the campaign, with the total death toll estimated to be 120,000-270,000. The number of Albanians expelled from the territories annexed by Serbia can vary from 60,000 to 300,000.

The intense influx of refugees from the region and the news of the massacres caused a deep shock in the Ottoman mainland. This further increased the hatred of minorities already present in Ottoman society. The situation became a factor that exacerbated the Ottoman genocides in World War I, which took place approximately two years after the end of the First Balkan War.

A large number of Pomaks in the Rhodopes were forcibly converted to Orthodoxy but later allowed to reconvert, most of them did. The Report of the International Commission on the Balkan Wars reported that in many districts the Moslem villages were systematically burned by their Christian neighbors. In Monastir 80% of the Muslim villages were burned by the Serbian and Greek army according to a British report. While in Giannitsa the Muslim quarter was burned alongside many Muslim villages in the Salonica province by the Greek army.

During the war, the Bulgarian army committed numerous atrocities, including mass murder, mass rape, torture, theft, and plundering against Turks and Muslims on a massive scale.

=== Petrovo ===
Petrovo was under Ottoman rule until the Balkan Wars when it was captured by Yane Sandanski. During the war many Muslims fled from the region, the only exception were Turks of Petrovo. The reason was because there was an agreement between Christians and Muslims to protect each other. While no Christian was injured or killed during the Ottoman retreat, when Bulgarians captured Petrovo almost all Petrovo Turks were burned in the village cafe. Some women were left alive to be wives of the soldiers, other were went to Kalimantsi to work as maids. The Turkish orphans were given to Bulgarian families, and some of them still know their origin.

=== Doiran ===
The Carnegie Report on the Balkan Wars states the following: "The Bulgarian army marched on to Doiran; on its departure looting and slaughter began. I saw an old man of eighty lying in the street with his head split open, and the dead body of a boy of thirteen. About thirty Muslims were killed that day in the streets,--I believe by the Bulgarian bands. On Wednesday evening, an order was issued that no Muslim might leave his house day or night until further notice.

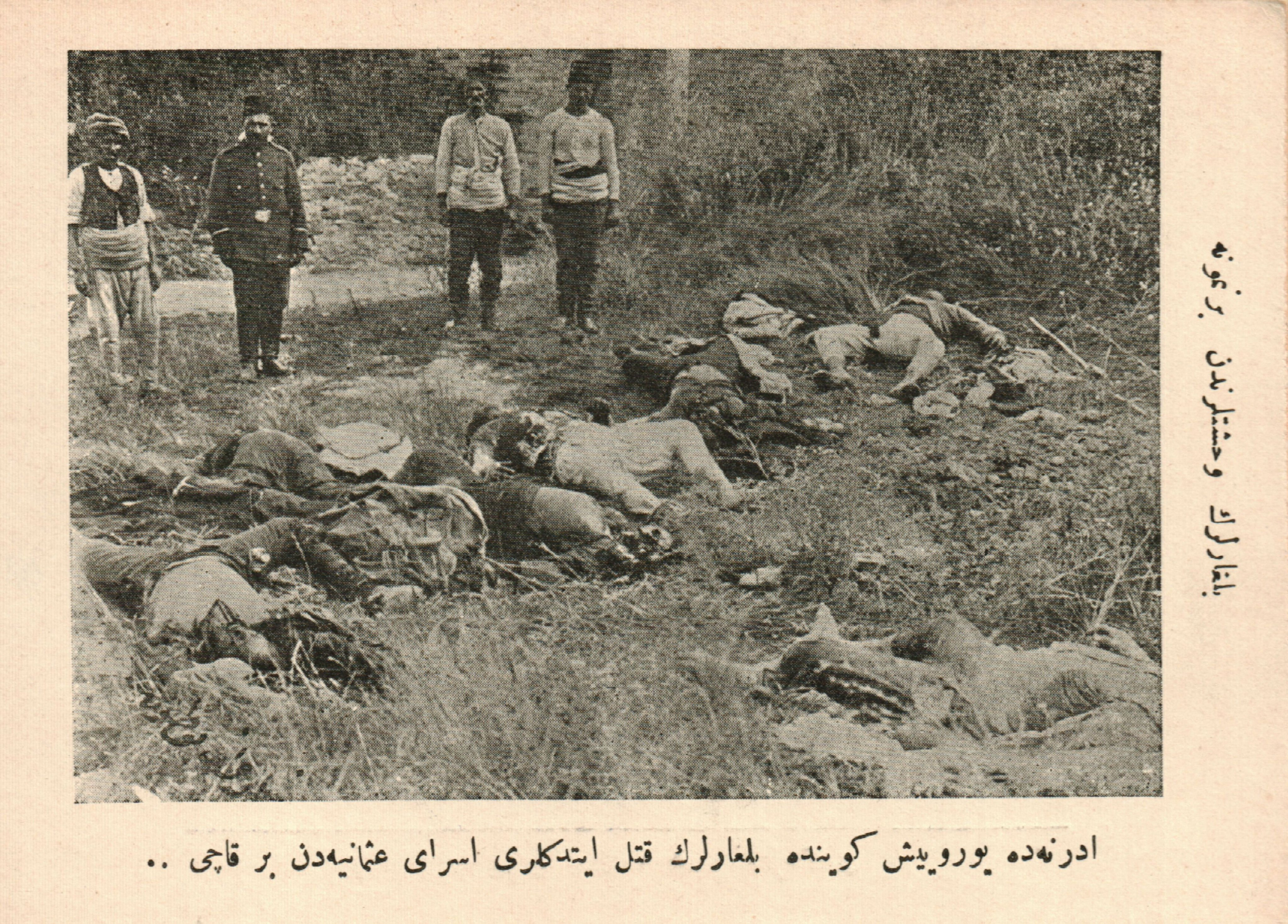
Postcard showing Turkish civilians who were massacred by the Bulgarian army

=== Strumica ===
The Carnegie Commission visited the camp of the Muslim refugees outside Salonica and talked with two groups of them who came from villages near Strumica. The Greeks told them that the Bulgarians would certainly massacre them if they stayed in the town; they urged, and pressed and persuaded. Most left under pressure. A few remained, and many were forced to leave. They heard that other villages had been burnt after they left, and some of them actually saw their villages in flames.

A group of these refugees from the village Yedna-Kuk, near Strumnitsa, gave their experiences during the first war. The Bulgarian bands arrived before the regular army, and ordered the whole male population to assemble in the mosque. They were shut in and robbed of 300 pounds in all. Eighteen of the wealthier villagers were bound and taken to Bossilovo, where they were killed and buried. The villagers were able to remember nine of their names.

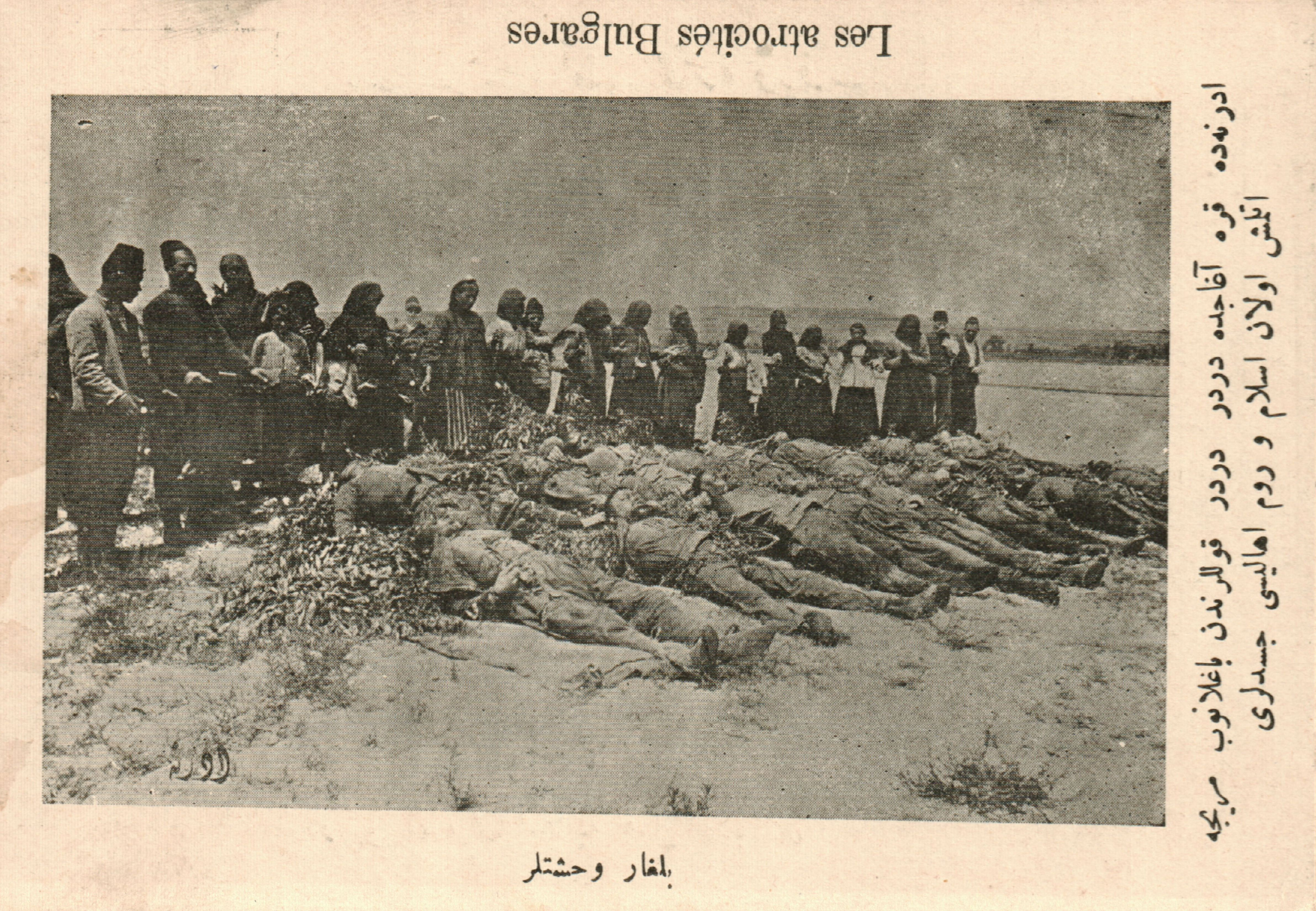
Postcard showing Turkish civilians who were massacred by the Bulgarian army

=== Kurkut ===
The Catholic priest Gustave Michel, superior of the mission at Kilkis, gave the following information to the correspondent of Le Temps (10 July). He could testify to certain massacres perpetrated by the Bulgarian bands at Kurkut. A Bulgarian band led by Donchev shut all the men of the place in the mosque, and gathered the women round it, to oblige them to witness the spectacle. The Bulgarian commandants then threw three bombs at the mosque but it was not blown up; so they then set fire to it, and all who were shut up in it, about 700 men, were burnt alive. Those who attempted to flee were shot down by Bulgarian commandants posted round the mosque, and Pere Michel found human heads, arms, and legs lying about half burned in the streets. At Planitsa, Donchev's band committed even worse atrocities. It first drove all the men to the mosque and burnt them alive; it then gathered the women and burnt them in their turn in the public square. At Rayonovo a number of men and women were massacred; the Bulgarians filled a well with their corpses. At Kukush the Muslims were massacred by the Bulgarian population of the town and their mosque destroyed. All the Turkish soldiers who fled without arms and arrived in groups from Salonica were massacred.

=== Kilkis ===
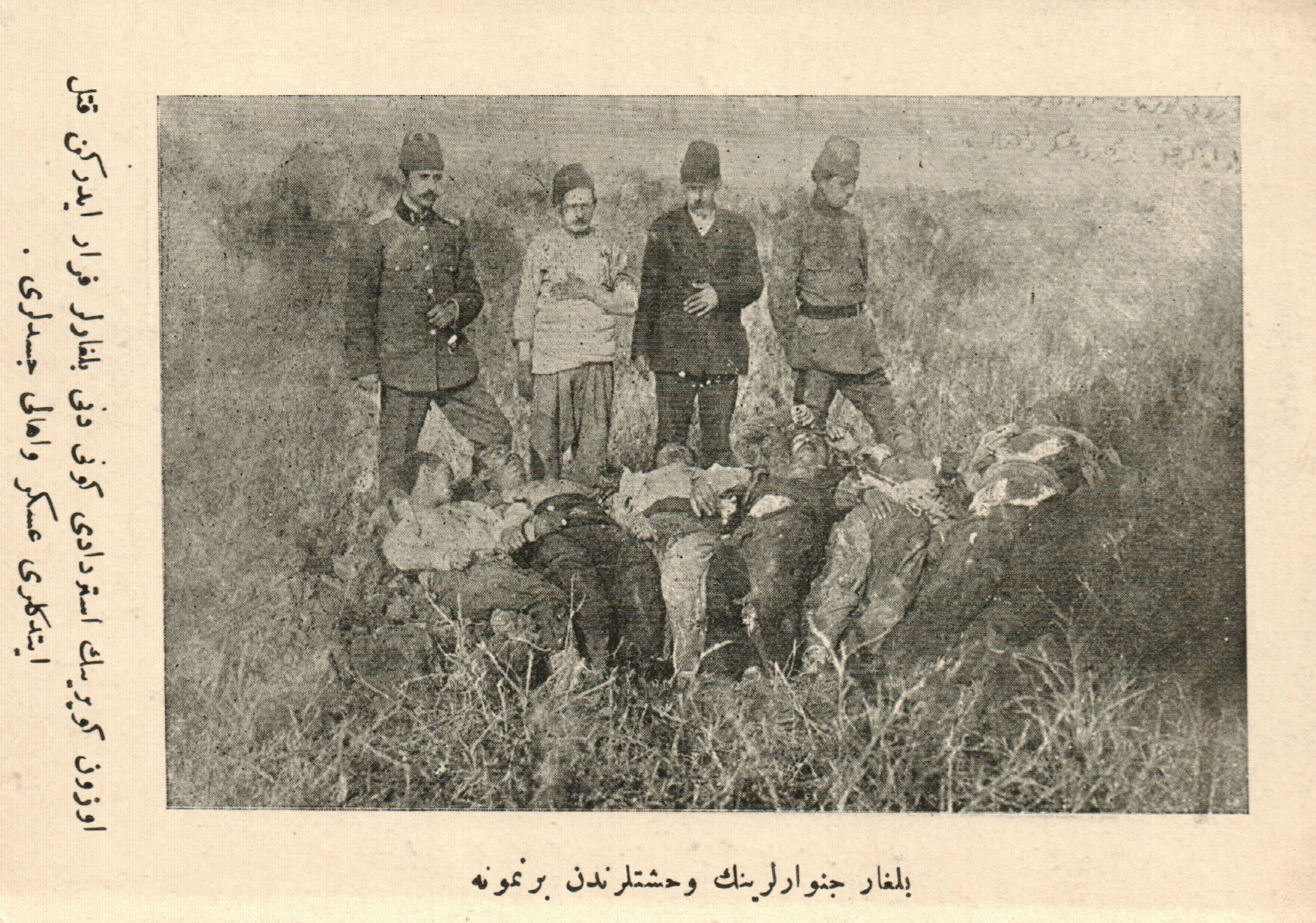
Postcard showing Turkish civilians who were massacred by the Bulgarian army

After the occupation of Salonica, disarmed Turkish soldiers in groups of two to three hundred at a time marched through Kukush on their way to their homes. They were captured by the Bulgarian bands and slaughtered, to the number of perhaps 2,000. A commission of thirty to forty Christians was established, which drew up lists of all the Muslim inhabitants throughout the district. Everyone was summoned to the mosque and there informed that he had been rated to pay a certain sum. Whole villages, were made responsible for the total amount; most of the men were imprisoned and were obliged to sell everything they possessed, including their wives' ornaments, to pay the ransom. They were often killed in spite of the payment of the money in full; he, himself, actually saw a Bulgarian commandant cut off two fingers of a man's hand and force him to drink his own blood mixed with raki.

The chief of bands, Donchev, arrived and matters were still worse. He burnt three Turkish villages (345 houses in all) in one day; Raianovo, Planitsa and Kukurtovo. He shut up the men in the mosques and burnt them alive; the women were shut up in barns and sexually violated; children were actually flung against the walls and killed. This the witness did not see, but heard from his Christian neighbors. Only twenty-two Muslim families out of 300 remained in Kukush; the rest fled to Salonica. Twelve small Muslim villages were wiped out in the first war, the men killed and the women taken away.

=== Serres ===
On 6 November 1912, the inhabitants of Serres, sent a deputation to meet the Bulgarian army and surrender the town. Next day Zancov, a Bulgarian Chief of bands, appeared in the town with sixteen men, and began to disarm the population. A day later the Bulgarian army entered Serres and received a warm welcome. That evening the Bulgarian soldiers, on the pretext that arms were still hidden in the houses of the Muslims, entered them and began to steal money and other valuables. Next day the Muslim refugees from the district north of Serres were invited to appear at the prefecture; they obeyed the Summons; but on their arrival a trumpet sounded and the Bulgarian soldiers seized their arms and began to massacre these inoffensive people; the massacre lasted three hours and resulted in the death of 600 Muslims. The number of the victims would have been incalculable had it not been for the energetic intervention of the Greek bishop, and of the director of the Orient bank.

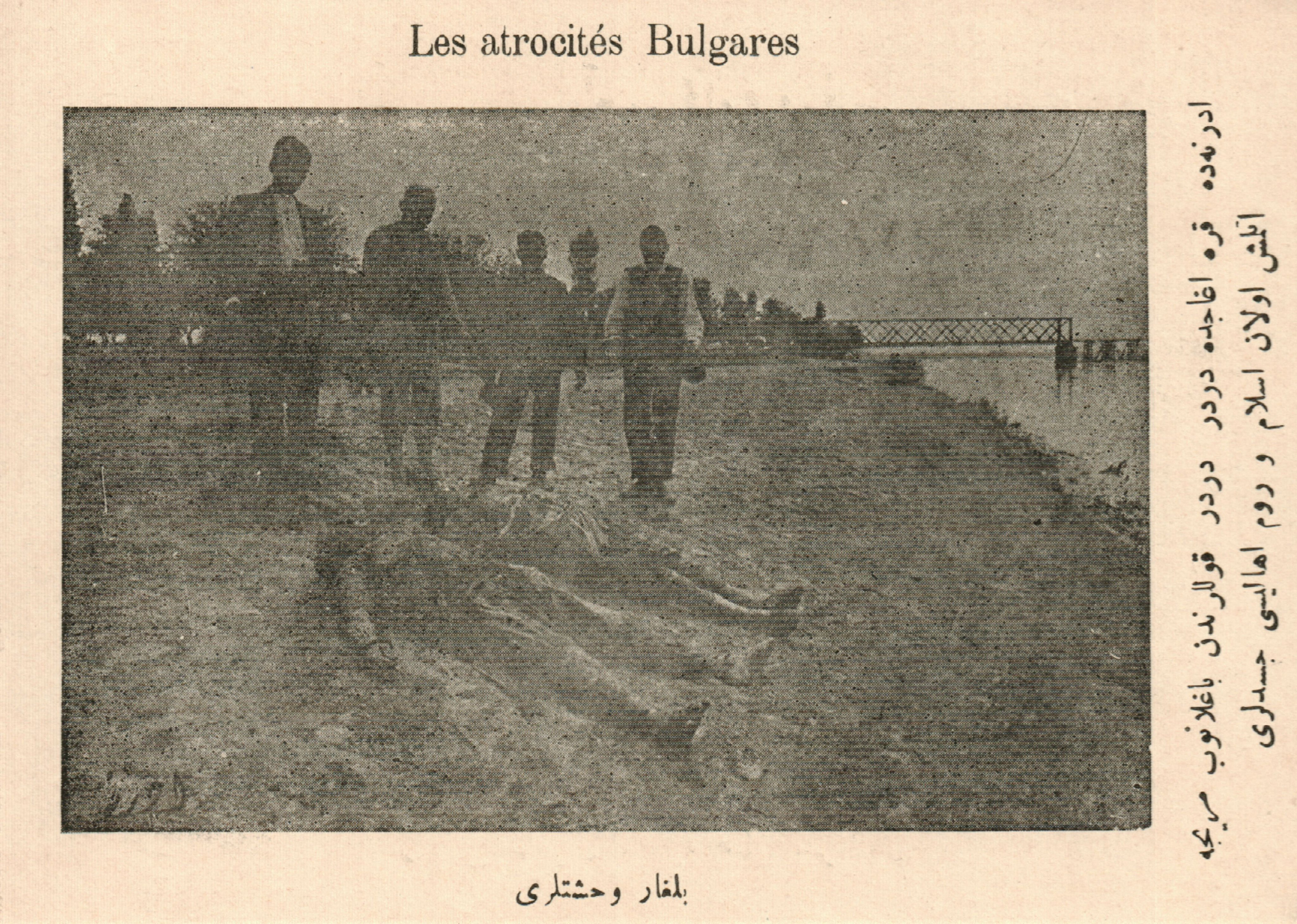
Postcard showing Turkish civilians who were massacred by the Bulgarian army

The Muslims of the town were then arrested in the cafes, houses and streets, and imprisoned, some at the prefecture and others in the mosques; many of the former were slaughtered with bayonets. Bulgarian soldiers in the meantime entered Turkish houses, sexually violated the women and girls and stole everything they could lay their hands on. The Muslims imprisoned in the overcrowded mosques were left without food for two days and nights and then released. For six days rifle shots were heard on all sides; the Muslims were afraid to leave their houses; and of this the Bulgarian soldiers took advantage to pillage their shops. Muslim corpses lay about in the streets and were buried only when they began to putrify. For several days the Bulgarian soldiers destroyed houses and mosques to obtain firewood. The corn and animals of the Muslims were seized by the Bulgarian authorities without any receipt or note of requisition. Complaints made on this subject were ignored. The furniture and antiquities belonging to the schools, mosques and hospitals were taken and sent to Sofia. The Bulgarians subjected several Muslim notables to all sorts of humiliations; they were driven with whips to sweep the streets and stables; and many a blow was given to those who dared to wear a fez. In a word, during the Bulgarian occupation the Muslims were robbed and maltreated both in the streets and at the prefecture, unless they had happened to give board and lodging to some Bulgarian officer. The Bulgarian officers and gendarmes before leaving Serres took everything that was left in the shops of Muslims, Jews and Greeks, and pitilessly burnt a large number of houses, shops, cafes, and mills.

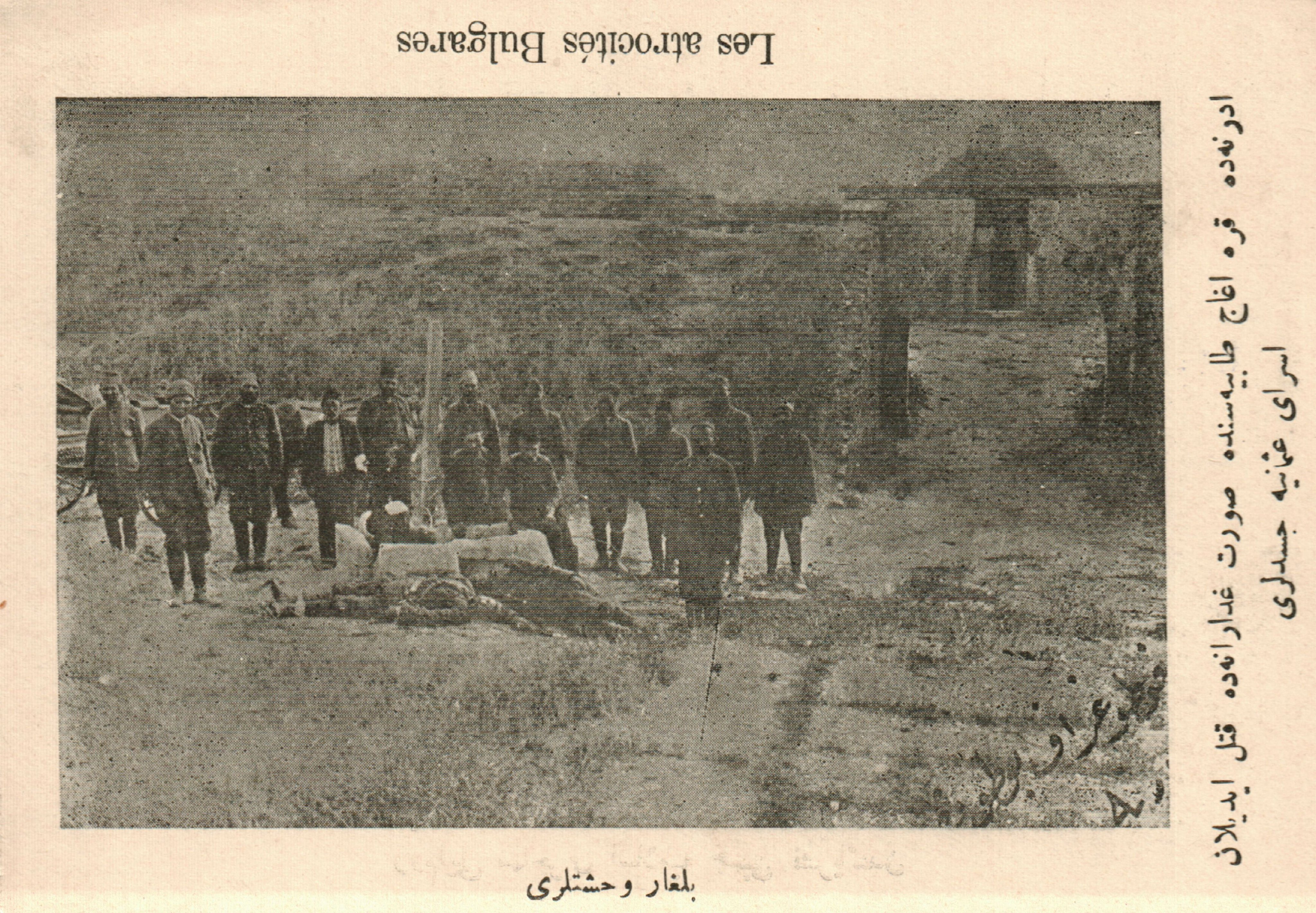
Postcard showing Turkish civilians who were massacred by the Bulgarian army

=== Kumanovo–Uskub ===
Bulgarian committee members constantly attacked the migrating convoys, thus causing the deaths of thousands of innocent Turkish people. In Xanthi, the Bulgarians dismembered the Turks they captured, and between Komanova and Skopje they massacred approximately 3,000 Turks. In Syros, on the grounds that the Turks killed two soldiers in self-defense, the Bulgarian officer looked at his watch and said: "It's half time now, you can do whatever you want to the Turks until the same hour tomorrow," the massacre began and between 1,200 and 1,900 innocent Turkish people were killed throughout the day.

Many of the Bulgarian prisoners captured during the war had female ears and fingers decorated with earrings and rings in their pockets. In the town of Kirmi, which consisted of 25 villages and whose population of around 12,000 was almost entirely Muslim-Turkish, the Bulgarians burned the houses and started to oppress the people. Those who could escape fled, and most of those who could not escape were killed by the Bulgarians. In the Çakal township, which consisted of 15 villages, belongings were looted and the people migrated to Komotini. However, although they were able to return to their homes, after their teachers, imams, headmen and other notables were massacred, those who remained were forced to reintegrate. According to information received from the town of Tutrakan, all Muslim-Turks in Tutrakan were waiting for the day when they will be "martyred" at the hands of the Bulgarians and "make several sacrifices every day." It is also reported that there was no house left in Maksutlar village of Tutrakan that was not plundered or a young Turkish Muslim girl left that was not raped by the Bulgarians.

The Bulgarians treated the Ottoman prisoners they captured during the war no differently than they treated civilians. For example, they brutally massacred 3,000 Ottoman prisoners they captured in Stara Zagora.

=== Oklanli ===
It is reported that, in the village of Oklanli (or Lagahanli), the Bulgarian troops locked up Turkish women in houses, raped them over a period of 10 days, then burned them alive.

== World War I and the Turkish War of Independence ==
=== Caucasus Campaign ===
The historian Uğur Ümit Üngör noted that during the Russian invasion of Ottoman lands, "many atrocities were carried out against the local Turks and Kurds by the Russian army and Armenian volunteers." Due to clashes with irregular Kurdish forces and being in an area that saw prior Armenian massacres, the majority of Russian commanders were biased against Muslims, including Kurds, with General Vladimir Liakhov ordering the killing of every Muslim native. According to Boris Shakhovskoi the Armenian nationalists wanted to exterminate the Muslims in the occupied regions. Hilmar Kaiser writes that "In December 1914, the Ottoman Third Army launched an offensive, hoping to take the Russians by surprise. The attack failed, however, and the army was almost annihilated. During their retreat, irregular units and fleeing Muslim civilians began plundering and massacring Armenian villages. The atrocities were motivated by the lack of supplies and a desire for revenge." Armenian cities were targeted despite having "remained loyal." A large part of the local Muslim Turks and Kurds fled west after the Russian invasion of eastern Anatolia in 1914–1918, in Talaat Pasha's Notebook the given number is at 702,905 Turks and Kurds. J. Rummel estimates that 128,000–600,000 Muslim Turks and Kurds were killed by Russian troops and Armenian irregulars; at least 128,000 of them between 1914 and 1915 according to Turkish statistician Ahmet Emin Yalman. After the formation of the Provisional Government in 1917, some 30,000–40,000 Muslims were killed by irregular Armenian units as retribution.

The Turkish-German historian Taner Akçam in his book A Shameful Act writes of Vehip Pasha's detailed account of the reprisals against Muslims during the retreat of Armenian and Russian forces from Western Armenia in 1917–1918 and sets the figure at 3,000 killed in the Erzincan and the Bayburt areas. Writing also of another eyewitness testimony claiming 3,000 dead in the Erzurum area, and 20,000 dead in Kars in the spring of 1918. Akçam also makes mention of a study of the Vilayet of Erzurum which sets the number of massacred Muslims as 25,000 in the spring of 1918, however, providing the examination of Armenian historian Vahakn Dadrian who claims from the wartime records of the Ottoman Third Army that "altogether some 5,000–5,500 victims are involved." Akçam writes of a Turkish source that describes the number of Muslim deaths during the winter and spring of 1919 in Kars as 6,500, whereas on 22 March 1920, Kâzım Karabekir put the number at 2,000 in certain villages and regions in Kars. Halil Bey in a 1919 letter to Karabekir claimed 24 villages in Iğdır had been razed.

=== Franco-Turkish War ===
Cilicia was occupied by the British after World War I, who were later replaced by the French. The French Armenian Legion armed returning Armenian refugees of the Armenian genocide to the region and assisting them. Eventually the Turks responded with resistance against the French occupation, battles took place in Marash, Aintab, and Urfa. Most of these cities were destroyed during the process with large civilian suffering. The French left the area together with the Armenians after 1920. The retribution for the Armenian Genocide served as justification for armed Armenians.

Also, during the Franco-Turkish War the Kaç Kaç incident occurred, which refers to the escape of 40,000 Turks from the city of Adana into more mountainous regions because of the Franco-Armenian occupation of 20 July 1920. During the escape, French airplanes bombed the fleeing Turkish population and the Belemedik hospital.

=== Greco-Turkish War ===
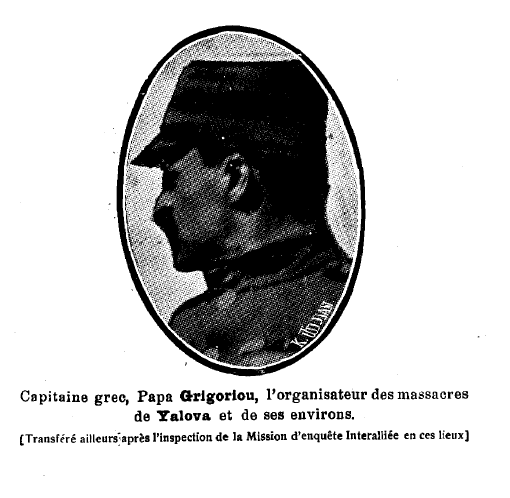
Greek Captain Papa Grigoriou – perpetrator of Muslim massacres during the Greco-Turkish War.

After the Greek landing and the following occupation of Western Anatolia during the Greco-Turkish War (1919–1922), Turkish resistance activity was answered with terror against the local Muslims. Killings, rapes, and village-burnings took place as the Greek Army advanced. However, as reported in a British intelligence report at the time, in general "the [Turkish] inhabitants of the occupied zone have in most cases accepted the advent of Greek rule without demur and in some cases undoubtedly prefer it to the [Turkish] Nationalist regime, which seems to have been founded on terrorism".

British military personnel observed that the Greek Army near Uşak was warmly welcomed by the Muslim population for "being freed from the license and oppression of the [Turkish] Nationalist troops"; there were "occasional cases of misconduct" by the Greek troops against the Muslim population, and the perpetrators were prosecuted by the Greek authorities, while the "worst miscreants" were "a handful of Armenians recruited by the Greek army", who were then sent back to Constantinople.

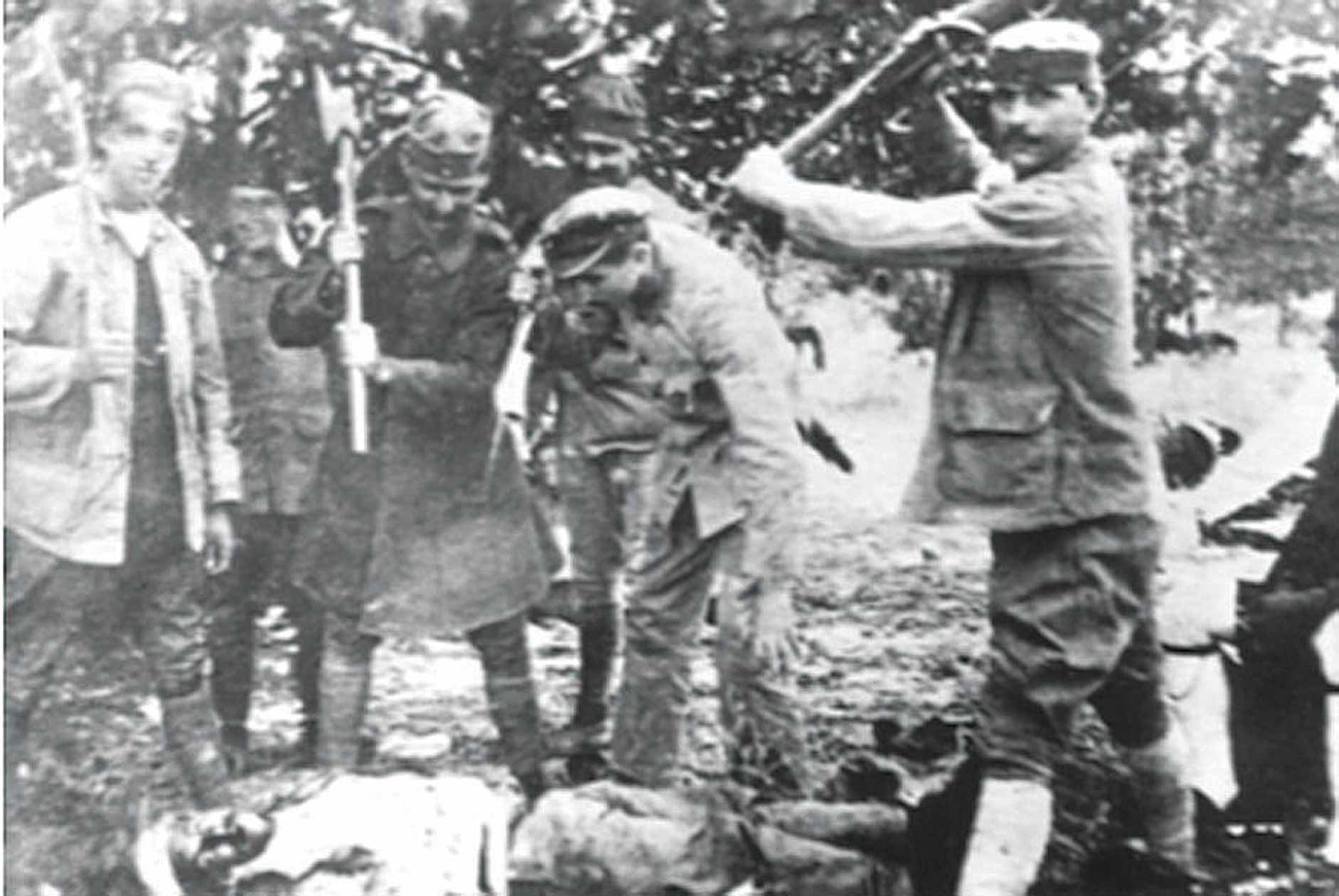
Greek soldiers with axes standing above a Turkish civilian they killed.

During the Greek occupation, Greek troops and local Greeks, Armenian and Circassian groups committed the Yalova Peninsula Massacres in early 1921 against the local Muslim population. These resulted, according to some sources, in the deaths of around 300 of the local Muslim populace, as well about 27 villages.

The precise number of casualties is not exactly known. Statements gathered by Ottoman official reveal a relatively low number of casualties: based on the Ottoman enquiry to which 177 survivors responded, only 35 were reported as killed, wounded or beaten or missing. This is also in accordance with Toynbee's accounts that one to two murders were enough to drive out the population. Another source estimates that barely 1,500 Muslims out of 7,000 survived in the environment of Yalova.

The Greeks advanced all the way to Central Anatolia. After the Turkish attack in 1922 the Greeks retreated and Norman M. Naimark notes that "the Greek retreat was even more devastating for the local population than the occupation". During the retreat, towns and villages were burned as part of a scorched earth policy, accompanied with massacres and rapes. During this war, a part of Western Anatolia was destroyed, large towns such as Manisa, Salihli together with many villages being burned. 3,000 houses in Alaşehir. The Inter-Allied commission, consisting of British, French, American and Italian officers found that "there is a systematic plan of destruction of Turkish villages and extinction of the Muslim population." According to Marjorie Housepian, 4,000 Muslims were executed in Izmir under Greek occupation.

During the war, in East Thrace, which was ceded to Greece with the Treaty of Sèvres, around 90,000 Turkish villagers fled to Bulgaria and Istanbul from the Greeks.

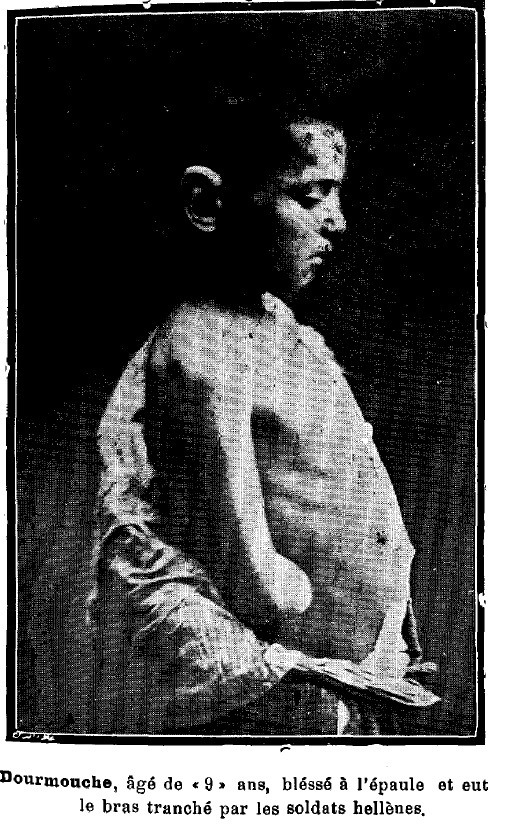
Durmuş ("Dourmouche"), a boy wounded and hand cut off during the Yalova peninsula massacres.

After the war, peace talks between Greece and Turkey started with the Lausanne Conference of 1922–1923. At the Conference, the chief negotiator of the Turkish delegation, Ismet Pasha, gave an estimate of 1.5 million Anatolian Turks that had been exiled or died in the area of Greek occupation. Of these, McCarthy estimates that 860,000 fled and 640,000 died; with many, if not most of those who died, being refugees as well. The comparison of census figures shows that 1,246,068 Anatolian Muslims had become refugees or had died. Furthermore, Ismet Pasha shared statistics showing the destruction of 141,874 buildings, and the slaughter or theft of 3,291,335 farm animals in the area of Greek occupation.

The peace that followed the Greco–Turkish War resulted in a population exchange between Greece and Turkey. As a result, the Muslim population of Greece with the exception of Western Thrace, and partially, the Muslim Cham Albanians, was relocated to Turkey.

== Total number of casualties ==
The forced mass displacement of Muslims out of the Balkans during the era of territorial contraction of the Ottoman Empire has become a topic of recent scholarly interest only in the 21st century.

=== Death toll ===
According to historian Justin McCarthy, between 1821 and 1922, from the beginning of the Greek War of Independence to the end of the Ottoman Empire, five million Muslims were driven from their lands and another five and a half million died, some of them killed in wars and others perishing as refugees from starvation, disease and other hardships. However, McCarthy's work has faced harsh criticism by many scholars, who have characterized his views as indefensibly biased towards Turkey and defending Turkish atrocities against Armenians, as well as engaging in genocide denial. In reference to McCarthy's previous book on Ottoman Anatolian demographics, Speros Vryonis writes: "On the whole, the book is marred by defective methodology and ... The statistical numbers of Muslims and Christians in Ottoman Anatolia still await their demographer".

According to Karl Kaser, "estimations speak about 5 million casualties and the same number of displaced persons" in the 19th and early 20th centuries. McCarthy's conclusions were referenced in a study published in the Journal of World History, which says around "five and a half million Muslims died of religious-ethnic war-related causes" between 1821 and 1922. Frederick F. Anscombe also referenced McCarthy's conclusions, saying "traumatic waves occurred in 1875–1878 and 1912–1923, but in all, between 1821 and 1922, 5.5 million Muslims died and 5 million became refugees in conflicts with Christian forces in the Balkans, Crimea and Caucasus." The historian Mark Biondich estimates that the number of emigrants and displaced from 1878 to 1912 reaches up to two million, and "when one adds those who were killed or expelled between 1912 and 1923, the number of Muslim casualties from the Balkan far exceeds three million."

The above estimates do not distinguish civilian and military deaths. Edward J. Erickson, using the Ottoman archives, estimated approximately one million Ottoman military deaths from 1912 to 1923 (of which 771,844 occurred in World War I and the rest in the Balkan Wars and Turkish War of Independence).

=== Settlement of refugees ===
The Ottoman authorities and charities provided some help to the immigrants and sometimes settled them in certain locations. In Turkey most of the Balkan refugees settled in Western Turkey and Thrace. The Caucasians, in addition to these areas also settled in Central Anatolia and around the Black Sea coast. Eastern Anatolia was not largely settled with the exception of some Circassian and Karapapak villages. There were also completely new villages founded by refugees, for example in uninhabited forested areas. Many people of the 1924 exchange were settled in former Greek villages along the Aegean coast. Outside of Turkey, Circassians were settled along the Hedjaz Railway and some Cretan Muslims at Syria's coast.

=== Academic debate ===
McCarthy is often viewed as a scholar on the Turkish side of the debate over Balkan Muslim death figures, who also supports the Turkish State's revisionist history which denies the Armenian Genocide. Michael Mann states that even if those figures were reduced "by as much as 50 percent, they still would horrify". In the discussion about the Armenian Genocide, McCarthy denies the genocide and is considered as the leading pro-Turkish scholar.

Scholarly critics of McCarthy acknowledge that his research on Muslim civilian casualties and refugee numbers (19th and early 20th centuries) has brought forth a valuable perspective, previously neglected in the Christian West, that millions of Muslims also suffered and died during those years. Donald W. Bleacher, though acknowledging that McCarthy is pro-Turkish nonetheless has called his scholarly study Death and Exile on Muslim civilian casualties and refugee numbers "a necessary corrective" challenging the West's model of all victims being Christians and all perpetrators as being Muslims.

== Destruction of Muslim heritage ==
Muslim heritage was extensively targeted during the persecutions. During their long rule the Ottomans had built numerous mosques, madrasas, caravanserais, bath-houses and other types of building. According to current research, around 20,000 buildings of all sizes have been documented in official Ottoman registers. However very little survives of this Ottoman heritage in most Balkan countries. Most of the Ottoman era mosques of the Balkans have been destroyed; the ones still standing often had their minarets destroyed. Before the Habsburg conquest, Osijek had 8–10 mosques, none of which remain today. During the Balkan wars there were cases of desecration, destruction of mosques and Muslim cemeteries. Of the 166 madrasas in the Ottoman Balkans in the 17th century, only eight remain and five of them are near Edirne. It is estimated that 95–98% were destroyed. The same is also valid for other types of buildings, such as markethalls, caravanserais and baths. From a chain of caravanserais across the Balkans only one is preserved while there are vague ruins of four others. There were in the area of Negroponte in 1521: 34 large and small mosques, six hamams, ten schools, and 6 dervish convents. Today only the ruin of one hamam remains.

Destruction of Ottoman mosques.
Town	During Ottoman rule	Still standing
Shumen	40	3
Serres	60	3
Belgrade	>100	1
Sofia	>100	1
Ruse	36	1
Sremska Mitrovica	17	0
Osijek	7	0
Požega	14–15	0
Timișoara	12	0

== Commemoration ==
=== Memorials ===
- The Iğdır Genocide Memorial and Museum in Iğdır "commemorate[s] massacres and persecution committed by Armenians in Iğdır Province". The memorial was built to further deny the Armenian genocide through the claim that Armenians massacred Turks, rather than vice versa, during World War I, which is generally accepted by scholars as being untrue.
- A monument erected in Anaklia, Georgia on 21 May 2012 commemorates the expulsion of the Circassians.

== Gallery ==
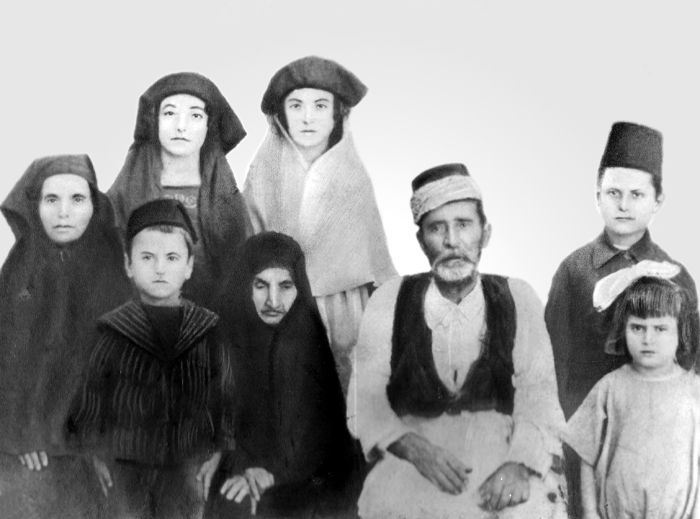
A Cretan Muslim family sent to Turkey after the population exchange in 1923.

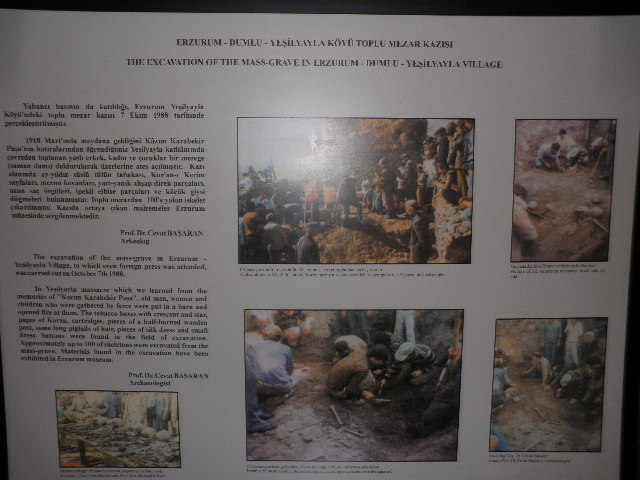
A mass grave excavation in the town of Yeşilyayla, Erzurum

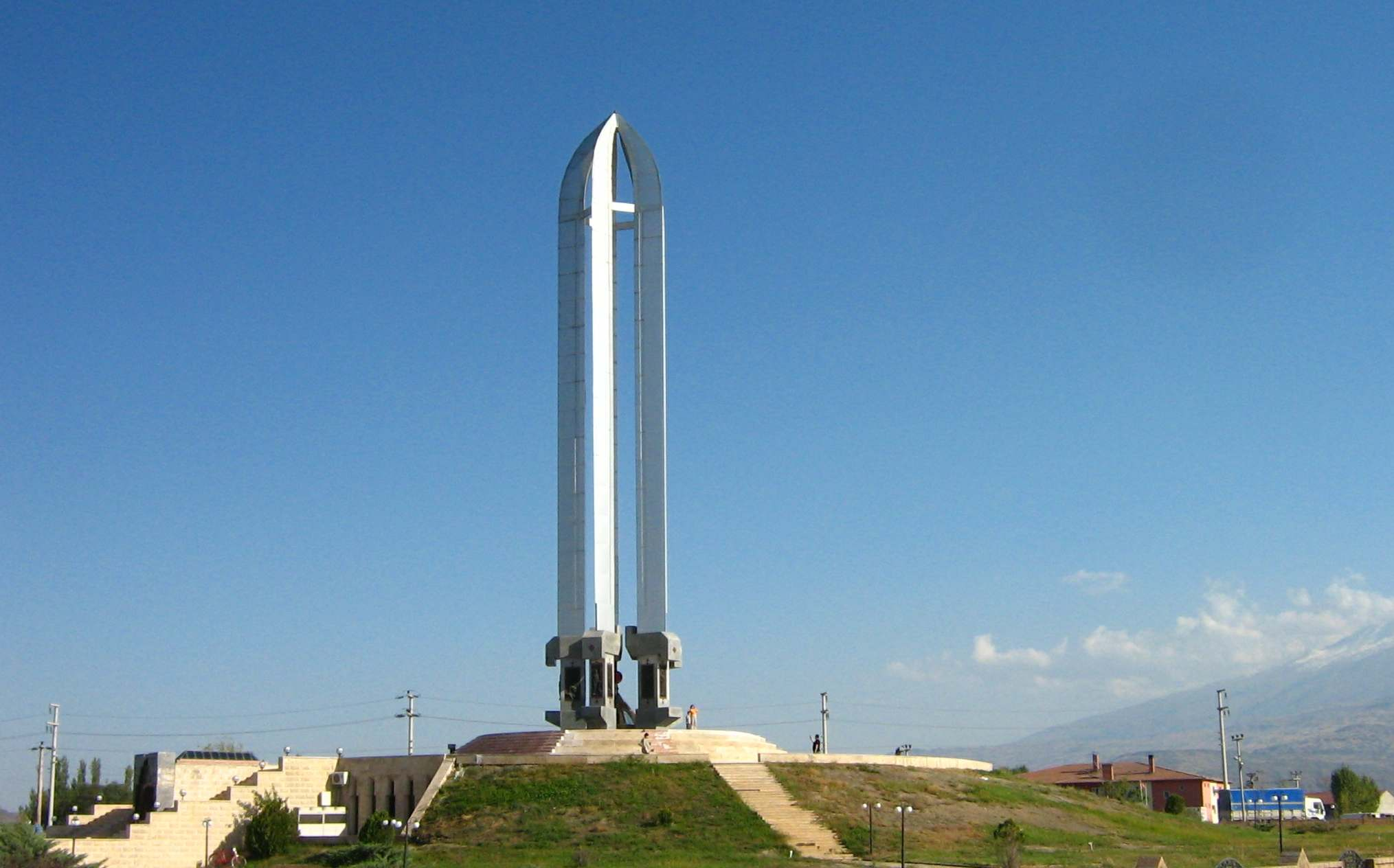
Iğdır Genocide Memorial and Museum. It is known for its victim-blaming and for its denial of the Armenian genocide.

== See also ==
- Alevi massacres
- Christianity in the Ottoman Empire
- Decolonization
- Dissolution of the Ottoman Empire
- History of the Ottoman Empire
- Islam in the Ottoman Empire
- List of massacres of Turkish people
- Ottoman Empire in World War I
- Persecution of Christians in the later Ottoman Empire
- Persecution of Muslims § Asia Minor
- Crimes against humanity

== Sources ==
- Ahmed, Akbar (2013). The Thistle and the Drone. Washington, D.C.: Brookings Institution Press. ISBN 978-0-8157-2379-0.
- Alan W. Fisher, The Crimean Tatars, Hoover Press, 1978, ISBN 978-0-8179-6663-8
- Alexander Laban Hinton, Thomas La Pointe,Hidden Genocides, Douglas Irvin-Erickson, Rutgers University Press, 2013, ISBN 978-0-8135-6164-6
- Benjamin Lieberman, Terrible Fate: Ethnic Cleansing in the Making of Modern Europe, Rowman & Littlefield, 2013, ISBN 978-1-4422-3038-5
- Charles Jelavich, The Establishment of the Balkan National States, 1804–1920, University of Washington Press, 1986, ISBN 978-0-295-80360-9
- Douglas Arthur Howard, The History of Turkey, Greenwood Publishing Group, 2001, ISBN 978-0-313-30708-9
- Erica Chenoweth, Adria Lawrence,Rethinking Violence, MIT Press, 2010, ISBN 978-0-262-01420-5
- Feldman, David; Volovici, Marc, eds. (2023). Antisemitism, Islamophobia and the Politics of Definition. Palgrave Critical Studies of Antisemitism and Racism. Palgrave Macmillan Cham. doi:10.1007/978-3-031-16266-4. ISBN 978-3-031-16265-7.
  - Anscombe, Frederick F. "Attitudes to Islam and Muslims in the Christian Balkans". In Feldman & Volovici (2023), pp. 41-66. doi:10.1007/978-3-031-16266-4_3
- Gibney, Matthew J.; Hansen, Randall, eds. (2005). Immigration and asylum: from 1900 to the present. ABC-CLIO. ISBN 9781576077962.
  - Fábos, Anita. "Muslim Immigration". In Gibney & Hansen (2005), pp. 434–440.
- Igor Despot, The Balkan Wars in the Eyes of the Warring Parties, iUniverse, 2012, ISBN 978-1-4759-4705-2
- John K. Cox, The History of Serbia, Greenwood Publishing Group, 2002, ISBN 978-0-313-31290-8
- John Joseph, Muslim-Christian Relations and Inter-Christian Rivalries, SUNY Press, 1983, ISBN 978-0-87395-600-0
- Kaser, Karl (2011). The Balkans and the Near East: Introduction to a Shared History. Berlin Wien: LIT Verlag Münster. ISBN 978-3-643-50190-5.
- Klejda Mulaj, Politics of Ethnic Cleansing, Lexington Books, 2008, ISBN 978-0-7391-4667-5
- Naimark, Norman M. (2002). Fires of Hatred: Ethnic Cleansing in Twentieth-Century Europe.
- Richmond, Walter (2008). The Northwest Caucasus: Past, Present, Future. London: Routledge. ISBN 978-1-134-00249-8.
- Ryan Gingeras, Sorrowful Shores, Oxford University Press, 2009, ISBN 978-0-19-160979-4
- Stanford J. Shaw, Ezel Kural Shaw, History of the Ottoman Empire and Modern Turkey, Cambridge University Press, 1977, ISBN 978-0-521-29166-8
- Stanley Elphinstone Kerr, The Lions of Marash, SUNY Press, 1973, ISBN 978-1-4384-0882-8
- Suraiya Faroqhi, The Cambridge History of Turkey, Cambridge University Press, 2006, ISBN 978-0-521-62095-6
- Ugur Ümit Üngör, The Making of Modern Turkey, Oxford University Press, 2011, ISBN 978-0-19-164076-6
- Victor Roudometof, Nationalism, Globalization, and Orthodoxy, Greenwood Publishing Group, 2001, ISBN 978-0-313-31949-5
- Walter Richmond, The Circassian Genocide, Rutgers University Press, 2013, ISBN 978-0-8135-6069-4
