= Kaç Kaç incident =

Event of the Franco-Turkish War in 1920

The Kaç Kaç incident (Turkish: Kaç Kaç olayı, Flee Flee! incident, Kaç literally means escape) is a popular phrase referring to the escape of 40,000 Turkish civilians from Çukurova during the Franco-Turkish War in 1920. French-Armenian airplanes bombed the fleeing population and the Belemedik hospital. Çukurova (Cilicia in antiquity) is a loosely defined region in southern Turkey which covers most of the modern Turkish provinces of Mersin, Adana, Osmaniye, and Hatay.

== Background ==
Following the Ottoman Empire's defeat in World War I, vast territories of the empire in Arabic countries were annexed by the British and the French empires according to the Sykes–Picot Agreement. The war was ended by the Armistice of Mudros on 30 November 1918; however, even after the armistice, the allies continued their advance and additional territory of Turkey was allocated to Greece, Italy, France, and Armenia. Çukurova in southern Turkey was one of the first territories in Turkey to be occupied by the allies. After the initial British landing in Mersin on 17 December 1918, the whole of Çukurova was occupied by British troops. On 1 January 1919, they were replaced by the French troops.

== Çukurova under French rule ==
The French empire, which also ruled Syria, facilitated the return of 120,000 Armenian Genocide survivors from Syria to Çukurova, and the French army in Çukurova was supported by Armenian forces as well as a British Indian brigade. Oppression of the local population by the Franco-Armenian forces began soon after the occupation. Although the French army could maintain control on the Mediterranean coast, controlling the mountainous area which covers the northern half of the French occupation zone was immensely more difficult. After the organized struggle of Turkish nationalists, the French army lost control of the railroad from Central Anatolia to Yenice (railroad junction), and after the battle of Karboğazı on 28 May 1920, in which the last of French troops in the Toros Mountains surrendered to the Turks, the French policy was reshaped as to keep only the territory south of the Mersin–Osmaniye railroad.

== 1920 July ==
In order to secure the French presence south of the railroad, the local Turkish population in the south was forced to escape north. On 10 July 1920, a Franco-Armenian operation was carried out in the already French-controlled city of Adana. Most Turks escaped to villages and then to the mountainous. During the escape, French airplanes bombed the fleeing population. The escapees also lacked adequate drinking water in the hot summer weather. It is reported that infectious diseases contributed to the deaths of the escapees and, in one case, the Belemedik hospital, the only hospital of the nationalists in the Toros Mountains, was also bombed. The mass escape continued for four days, but it later on became widespread in all cities of Çukurova and was named kaç kaç incident.

== Aftermath ==
In the Treaty of Ankara, signed on 20 October 1921, the French government agreed to return Çukurova, except for the territory of the Sanjak of Alexandretta, to Turkey. The French army evacuated Mersin on 3 January 1922, Adana on 5 January, and Osmaniye on 7 January.
