= Padyandus =

Ancient town in Cappadocia

Coordinates: 37.4278°N 34.8711°E

Padyandus or Podyandos (Ancient Greek: Παδυανδός), also Paduandus, Podandos or Podandus (Πόδανδος), and appearing corrupted in ancient sources as Opodanda, Opodandum, and Rhegepodandos (Ῥεγεποδανδός) was an ancient town in Cataonia, the southernmost part of Cappadocia, in what is today Turkey. The town was located about 40 km to the southeast of Faustinopolis, near the pass of Mount Taurus known by the name of the Cilician Gates (Ptol. v. 7. § 7.). Extended by the emperor Valens (364-378), the town is mentioned in the itineraria, but its name assumes different forms; as Paduandus (Tab. Peut.), Podandos (It. Ant. p. 145), Mansio Opodanda (It. Hieros. p. 578), and Rhegepodandos (Hierocl. p 699). The place is described by Basilius (Epist. 74) as one of the most wretched holes on earth. It is said to have derived its name from a small stream in the neighborhood. (Const. Porphyr. Vit. Basil. 36; comp. Cedren. p. 575; Jo. Scylitz. Hist. pp. 829, 844.) Due to similarity of name, tradition assigns the location of Padyandus to that of Pozantı, a position that modern scholars only tentatively accept.

== See also ==
- Battle of Kopidnadon
