= Karboğazı ambush =

1920 battle in the Franco-Turkish War

- Part of the Franco-Turkish War
Date	May 27–28, 1920
Location	Karboğazı, Tarsus 37°18′N 34°43′E
Result	Turkish victory

Belligerents
Grand National Assembly	France

Commanders and leaders
Kemal Bey; Bucaklı Hasan Ağa; Ziya Bey (83rd regiment commander)	Major Mesnil (POW); Georges Journois (POW)

Units involved
Turkish National Forces	French Armed Forces: French Army; French Armenian Legion

Strength
Turkish claims: 44 Men	Turkish claims: 923–1,000 soldiers

Casualties and losses
Turkish claims: None	Turkish claims: 200+ killed 673 prisoners (650 soldiers and 23 officers); 1,000+ different weapons 2 cannons 8 machine guns 90 mules

The Karboğazı ambush (Turkish: Karboğazı Baskını), also known as Battle of Karboğazı (Turkish: Karboğazı Savaşı) was an engagement recorded in Turkish historiography, fought between the Turkish nationalists and the French battalion on Toros Mountains during the Turkish War of Independence. Karboğazı literally means "Snow Pass".

== Background ==
Following the defeat of the Ottoman Empire in the First World War, the Ottoman army was disarmed according to the Armistice of Mudros. Although the Ottoman Empire had to agree to give up vast territories including most of Middle East, the Allies further retained the power of controlling what was left of the Ottoman Empire, namely Turkey. In this context, Allies occupied Mersin on 17 December 1918, just 47 days after the armistice. Soon, France occupied most of south Anatolia. Since the southwest was under Italian control and west Anatolia was under Greek control, Turkey lost the gateway to the Mediterranean Sea.

== French plan to control the mountains ==
France tried to control the sea coast and the alluvial plains like Çukurova (Cilicia of the antiquity). But the control of the small settlements on Toros Mountains was difficult. Moreover, because of the nationalistic opposition, which would ultimately end up in Turkish Republic, the Gülek Pass, Cilician Gates of the antiquity, which is the main pass from Mediterranean coast to Central Anatolia, was under continuous threat from the Turkish nationalist forces Kuva-yi Milliye. A battalion under Major Mesnil was commissioned for the task of securing French presence around Gülek Pass. The headquarters of the battalion was in the village of Pozantı, now a ilçe (district) center, and a small hospital in the nearby village of Belemedik was established under the supervision of Mesnil's wife. Mesmil's assistant was Georges Journois, who would fight against Germany as a brigadier general in the Second World War. Mesnil also had a group of guides, who were actually local Armenians. However, in the spring of 1920, Turkish nationalists began controlling the railroad from Pozantı to the south, and Pozantı was effectively blocked from Çukurova.

== The clash ==
After receiving approval from General Duffieux through messages dropped by warplanes, local commander Mesnil decided to evacuate Pozantı, and to return to French lines by a surprise retreat during the night of the 26–27 May. According to official reports, the unit consisted of 9 officers, 696 soldiers, 4 cavalrymen, 19 wounded officers and soldiers, 44 civilian Greeks and Armenians as well as 39 Turkish prisoners of war. Mesnil also left some wounded soldiers back with a letter written to Turkish commanders asking for fair treatment for them. In Mesnil's letter to Turkish commanders, he said:

I am leaving from Pozantı on the order given. I leave the wounded who cannot stand the trouble of the road to you.

By that, he attempted to save his life and break away by leaving his wounded behind. Following this retreat, a group of 44 soldiers of Turkish nationalists followed the Mesnil’s troops and had a small fight in Tekir province. Mesnil, having casualties in this engagement, run towards Karboğazı and stayed here on 26 May 1920. Meanwhile, they came across two local Yörük villagers, a woman named Hatice and a man named Kumcu Veli, from the village of Yaylaçukuru, now called Gülek. French asked them if they saw any Nationalist Forces around, and they asked for food supplies. Hatice said she did not see any Nationalists and she went back to report them to the Turkish army with the disguise of finding the supplies. Hatice informed Kemal Bey, later Kemal Ekin, the local militia chief of Kuvai Milliye. Kemal Bey with some members of Aydınlı tribe and villagers waited for the battalion in ambush. They had taken up positions on the two opposite sides of the valley called Karboğazı. The French had the advantage in numbers and superior artillery, but the nationalists had the advantage of cover.

French hired Kumcu Veli as their guide but he misguided French forces to Karboğazı, a valley where the Turkish Resistance volunteers had set up an ambush. Early on 27 May, the shootings began from both sides of the valley. French soldiers tried to escape to open space towards Pozantı. But they ran into the third group of nationalists. Towards the evening, after heavy casualties, the battalion surrendered. They were led to Yaylaçukuru, where they signed the protocol of surrender with Lieutenant Hasan Fehmi, later Hasan Akıncı, nicknamed Kara Afet. The prisoners of war received bulgur, a cereal food, with meat and ayran, a cold yogurt beverage. They were held captive until 25 September 1921. This victory of the Turkish Resistance forced the French to completely withdraw from Middle Taurus Mountains and to make peace negotiation requests.

== POW and other casualties ==
The total number of prisoners of war was 650, including 23 officers(1 Major), two of them being Mesnil and Journois. Also, 2 cannons, 8 machine guns, 40 automatic rifles, swords, 1000+ various weapons, and more than 90 mules were seized by the nationalists. The death casualty of the French side was heavy. The exact figures are found in the official letter of the Turkish Commander of Western Cilician Front Tekelioğlu Sinan to President Mustafa Kemal Atatürk.

== Consequences ==
The battle in Karboğazı was relatively small, but effectively ended French plans to seize the Toros Mountains. In 1921, France agreed to withdraw from Turkey by the Cilicia Peace Treaty and Accord of Ankara.
