= Karboğazı =

Mountain pass in Turkey

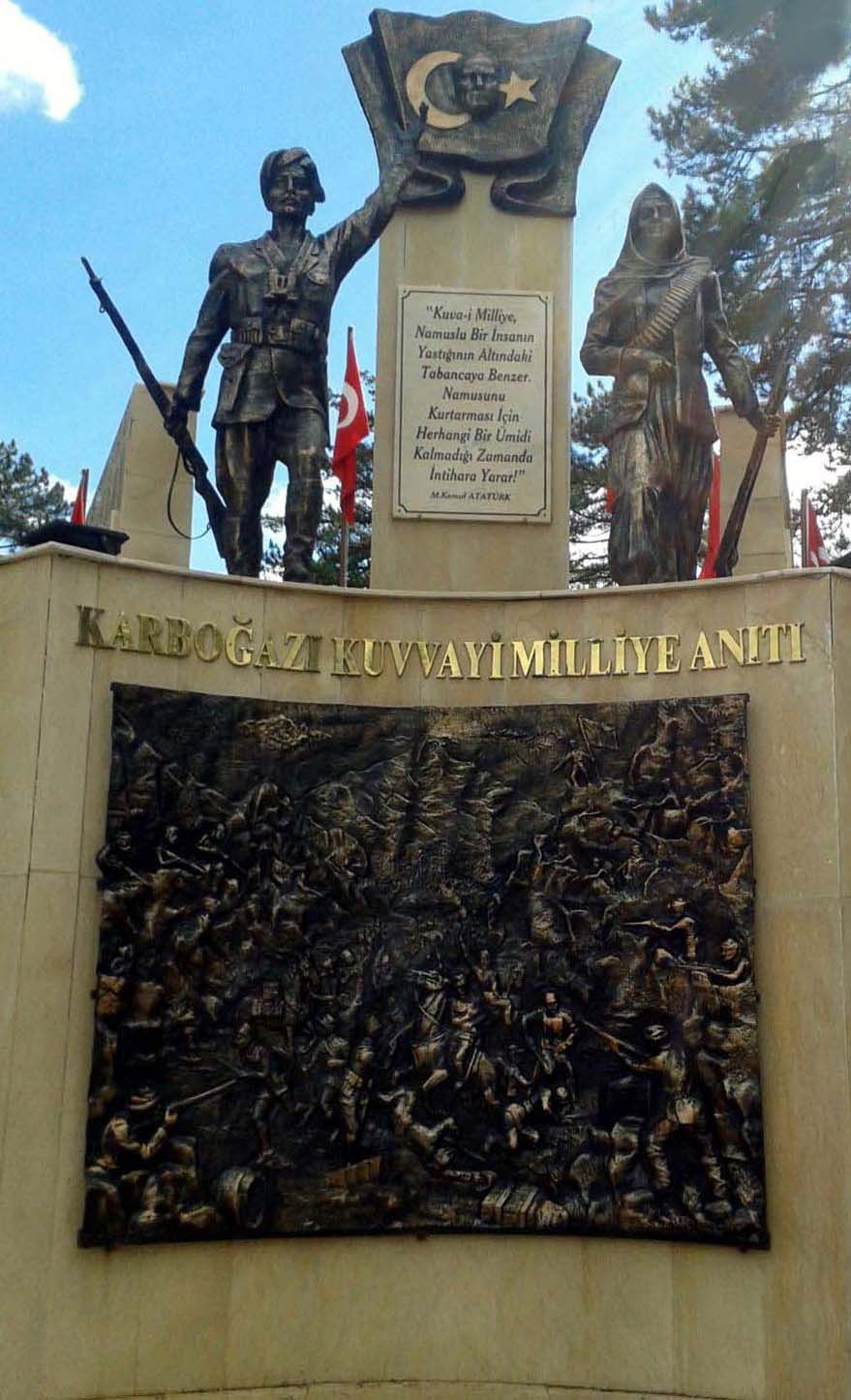
Karboğazu Monument, Mersin Province, Turkey

Karboğazı is a mountain pass in the vicinity of the borders of Mersin Province, Adana Province and Niğde Province, Turkey. It literally means "snow pass (strait)" in Turkish.

The pass at 37°18′N 34°43′E is in the rural northern area of Tarsus ilçe (district) close to Adana and Niğde borders and the Mount Bolgar. Situated in the middle and northeastern sector of Taurus Mountainous range and to the north of Gülek. It is 6 km (3.7 mi) north west of the Turkish state highway D.750. Its distance to Tarsus is 60 km (37 mi) and to Mersin is 87 km (54 mi).

Karboğazı literally means "snow-pass". It is situated in a high valley around a tributary of Berdan River. The upper reaches of the valley are usually snow-covered. The location was officially included in the Tourism centers of Mersin Province. With a peak at 3,524 m (11,562 ft), the area will be developed as a ski resort.

This pass was the scene of one of the critical fights during the Turkish War of Independence on 27–28 May 1920, called the Karboğazı ambush.
