= Battle of Gulf of Attaleia =

- Part of the Arab–Byzantine wars
- Map of the Arab–Byzantine naval conflict in the Mediterranean, 7th–11th centuries
Date	Summer 790
Location	Gulf of Antalya
Result	Abbasid victory

Belligerents
Byzantine Empire	Abbasid Caliphate

Commanders and leaders
Theophilos, strategos of the Cibyrrhaeots (POW)	Unknown

Strength
Unknown	Unknown

The Battle of Attaleia was a naval engagement between the Abbasid Caliphate and the Byzantine Empire in the Gulf of Antalya. The Abbasids won the naval engagement and captured the Byzantine commander.

== Background ==
In the early summer of 790, a Byzantine fleet was operating off the Syrian coast. There they managed to surprise some Arab ships and capture them alongside their troops. It was considered a minor victory after their recent defeat by the Abbasids in 788. Despite this victory, the Byzantines entered into internal dissensions between Irene of Athens and her son, Constantine VI. Irene sent the officials to proclaim their oath that as long as Irene lives, they would not allow Constantine to take power. Meanwhile, in late summer, the Abbasids launched a major expeditionary force against Cyprus to retaliate for their defeat.

== Battle ==
The Abbasid navy raided Cyprus, which was a condominium between the Arabs and Byzantines. The Byzantine empress quickly realized the situation, thanks to the Byzantine officials there. Irene quickly organized a navy and a land army. The fleet mainly came from the Cibyrrhaeot theme and the Aegean Islands. The land forces came from the Anatolic Theme and the Thracesian Theme. The combined naval and land forces gathered near Myra in Cibyrrhaeot. When the Abbasids finished their raid of Cyprus, they sailed into the Gulf of Antalya. The Byzantines sighted them and met them in battle near the west coast of the gulf. The Byzantine land forces could not offer any help, and the Aegean fleet was too small to fight the Arabs. The fight mainly fell on the Cibyrrhaeot fleet. This naval force was led by the strategos of the theme itself, Theophilos. The Arabs outnumbered the Byzantines and managed to rout the majority of their ships. They surrounded Theophilos's ship and captured its crew alongside the commander.

== Aftermath ==
Theophilos was executed by the Abbasid Caliph Harun al-Rashid after refusing to abandon his faith. The defeat of the Byzantines came at a bad time for Irene, who already suffered defeats by them in 782 and 788, during her struggle against her son Constantine VI.

== Sources ==
- Warren Treadgold (1988), The Byzantine revival, 780-842.
- Charles D. Stanton (2015), Medieval Maritime Warfare.
- Stephen Mitchell (1981), Armies and Frontiers in Roman and Byzantine Anatolia.
