= Hamidiye, Pozantı =

Hamidiye
- Neighbourhood
- Location in Turkey
- Coordinates: 37°33′34″N 34°58′47″E
- Country: Turkey
- Province: Adana
- District: Pozantı
- Population (2022): 823
- Time zone: UTC+3 (TRT)

Hamidiye is a neighbourhood in the municipality and district of Pozantı, Adana Province, Turkey. Its population is 823 (2022).
