= Yukarıbelemedik, Pozantı =

Yukarıbelemedik
- Neighbourhood
- Location in Turkey
- Coordinates: 37°38′N 34°56′E
- Country: Turkey
- Province: Adana
- District: Pozantı
- Population (2022): 374
- Time zone: UTC+3 (TRT)

Yukarıbelemedik is a neighbourhood in the municipality and district of Pozantı, Adana Province, Turkey. Its population is 374 (2022).
