= Dağdibi, Pozantı =

Dağdibi
- Neighbourhood
- Location in Turkey
- Coordinates: 37°38′37″N 35°00′06″E
- Country: Turkey
- Province: Adana
- District: Pozantı
- Population (2022): 608
- Time zone: UTC+3 (TRT)

Dağdibi is a neighborhood in the municipality and district of Pozantı, Adana Province, Turkey. Its population is 608 (2022).
