= Eskikonacık, Pozantı =

Eskikonacık
- Neighbourhood
- Location in Turkey
- Coordinates: 37°22′N 34°52′E
- Country: Turkey
- Province: Adana
- District: Pozantı
- Population (2022): 335
- Time zone: UTC+3 (TRT)

Eskikonacık is a neighbourhood in the municipality and district of Pozantı, Adana Province, Turkey. Its population is 335 (2022).
