= Tourism centers of Mersin Province =

Tourism centers of Mersin Province, are eight officially determined locations where the touristic investments will be promoted through incentive scheme. in Mersin Province, Turkey. Six of the locations are known as Tourist centers and the last two in Tarsus are known as Culture and Tourism conservation and development areas. Except for the last one (Karboğazı) which is in the mountains, all of these centers are seaside locations.

District	Name of the center	Area ha	Distance to district center km	Distance to Mersin km
Anamur	Melleç	30	21	245
Gülnar	Ortaburun	91	35	151
Silifke	Kargıcak	72	35	120
Silifke	Narlıkuyu-Akyar	1046	16	75
Silifke	Ovacık	95	43	128
Silifke	Taşucu-Boğsak	1159	16	96
Tarsus		1712	15	40
Tarsus	Karboğazı	3573	60	87
