= Aşçıbekirli, Pozantı =

Aşçıbekirli
- Neighbourhood
- Location in Turkey
- Coordinates: 37°38′N 34°58′E
- Country: Turkey
- Province: Adana
- District: Pozantı
- Population (2022): 909
- Time zone: UTC+3 (TRT)

Aşçıbekirli is a neighbourhood in the municipality and district of Pozantı, Adana Province, Turkey. Its population is 909 (2022).
