= Kamışlı, Pozantı =

Kamışlı
- Neighbourhood
- Location in Turkey
- Coordinates: 37°33′20″N 34°56′57″E
- Country: Turkey
- Province: Adana
- District: Pozantı
- Population (2022): 1,566
- Time zone: UTC+3 (TRT)

Kamışlı is a neighbourhood in the municipality and district of Pozantı, Adana Province, Turkey. Its population is 1,566 (2022).
