= Yağlıtaş, Pozantı =

Yağlıtaş
- Neighbourhood
- Location in Turkey
- Coordinates: 37°36′N 34°53′E
- Country: Turkey
- Province: Adana
- District: Pozantı
- Population (2022): 265
- Time zone: UTC+3 (TRT)

Yağlıtaş is a neighbourhood in the municipality and district of Pozantı, Adana Province, Turkey. Its population is 265 (2022).
