= Karakışlakçı, Pozantı =

Karakışlakçı
- Neighbourhood
- Location in Turkey
- Coordinates: 37°40′N 34°54′E
- Country: Turkey
- Province: Adana
- District: Pozantı
- Population (2022): 459
- Time zone: UTC+3 (TRT)

Karakışlakçı is a neighbourhood in the municipality and district of Pozantı, Adana Province, Turkey. Its population is 459 (2022).
