= Çamlıbel, Pozantı =

Çamlıbel
- Neighbourhood
- Location in Turkey
- Coordinates: 37°28′33″N 35°04′04″E
- Country: Turkey
- Province: Adana
- District: Pozantı
- Population (2022): 105
- Time zone: UTC+3 (TRT)

Çamlıbel is a neighbourhood in the municipality and district of Pozantı, Adana Province, Turkey. Its population is 105 (2022).
