= Ömerli, Pozantı =

Ömerli
- Neighbourhood
- Location in Turkey
- Coordinates: 37°31′52″N 34°51′20″E
- Country: Turkey
- Province: Adana
- District: Pozantı
- Population (2022): 194
- Time zone: UTC+3 (TRT)

Ömerli is a neighbourhood in the municipality and district of Pozantı, Adana Province, Turkey. Its population is 194 (2022).
