= Yazıcık, Pozantı =

Yazıcık
- Neighbourhood
- Location in Turkey
- Coordinates: 37°34′57″N 34°56′48″E
- Country: Turkey
- Province: Adana
- District: Pozantı
- Population (2022): 238
- Time zone: UTC+3 (TRT)

Yazıcık is a neighbourhood in the municipality and district of Pozantı, Adana Province, Turkey. Its population is 238 (2022).
