= Alpu, Pozantı =

Alpu
- Neighbourhood
- Location in Turkey
- Coordinates: 37°28′16″N 34°52′49″E
- Country: Turkey
- Province: Adana
- District: Pozantı
- Population (2022): 246
- Time zone: UTC+3 (TRT)

Alpu is a neighbourhood in the municipality and district of Pozantı, Adana Province, Turkey. Its population is 246 (2022).
