= Yenikonacık, Pozantı =

Yenikonacık
- Neighbourhood
- Location in Turkey
- Coordinates: 37°25′N 34°51′E
- Country: Turkey
- Province: Adana
- District: Pozantı
- Population (2022): 350
- Time zone: UTC+3 (TRT)

Yenikonacık is a neighbourhood in the municipality and district of Pozantı, Adana Province, Turkey. Its population is 350 (2022).
