= Fındıklı, Pozantı =

Fındıklı
- Neighbourhood
- Location in Turkey
- Coordinates: 37°30′08″N 34°55′38″E
- Country: Turkey
- Province: Adana
- District: Pozantı
- Population (2022): 395
- Time zone: UTC+3 (TRT)

Fındıklı is a neighbourhood in the municipality and district of Pozantı, Adana Province, Turkey. Its population is 395 (2022).
