= Battle of Kopidnadon =

Battle between the armies of the Abbasid Caliphate and the Byzantine Empire

Coordinates: 37.4278°N 34.8711°E

- Part of the Arab–Byzantine wars
- Asia Minor and the Byzantine-Arab frontier c. 780 AD
Date	September 788 AD
Location	Podandos, Asia Minor
Result	Abbasid victory

Belligerents
Abbasid Caliphate	Byzantine Empire

The Battle of Kopidnadon or Kopidnados took place in September 788 between the armies of the Abbasid Caliphate and the Byzantine Empire. The Abbasid army launched an invasion of Byzantine Asia Minor, and was confronted by a Byzantine force at Kopidnadon. The resulting battle was an Abbasid victory. Among the Byzantine losses was a certain Diogenes, who is identified by some scholars with the probable original source for the literary hero Digenes Akritas.

== Background ==
Ever since the failure of the last Arab attempt to conquer the Byzantine capital Constantinople, regular, almost annual raids were undertaken by the Caliphate's forces into Byzantine Asia Minor. In 782, a major invasion led by the Abbasid heir apparent, the future Harun al-Rashid (r. 786–809), resulted in a humiliating settlement for Byzantium, which was forced to sue for a truce in exchange for an annual payment of 160,000 gold nomismata. In 785, Empress-regent Irene of Athens resolved to cease the payment of the tribute, and warfare recommenced. The Arabs raided the Armeniac Theme, but in early 786 the Byzantines retaliated by sacking and razing to the ground the fortress town of Hadath in Cilicia, which the Abbasids had spent the last five years turning into a major stronghold and military base for their cross-border expeditions against Byzantium.

== Battle ==
With Harun al-Rashid's accession in 786, the raids launched over the next two years were relatively minor affairs; the first great invasion of the new reign occurred in 788, when a large expeditionary force crossed the Cilician Gates into the Anatolic Theme. Although the raid is not mentioned in Arabic sources, its description by the Byzantine chronicler Theophanes the Confessor points to a major invasion, as it was confronted by the forces of the two most powerful Byzantine thematic armies, those of the Anatolic Theme itself and of the Opsician Theme.

The site of the battle is called "Kopidnadon" in Theophanes, a name otherwise unattested. Modern scholars, beginning with Henri Grégoire in 1932, have identified it with the town of Podandos, on the western exit of the Cilician Gates. According to the brief account of Theophanes, the battle ended in a bloody defeat for the Byzantines, who lost many men and officers, including members of the tagma of the Scholai who had been banished to the provinces by Irene in 786 for their continued support of Iconoclasm. Theophanes also singles out the loss of the capable officer Diogenes, a tourmarches (division commander) of the Anatolics.

== Impact ==
The immediate impact of the Byzantine defeat seems to have been negligible; losses were heavy but not unbearable, and the level of devastation of the region seems not to have been excessive. In material terms, there is therefore little to distinguish the defeat at Kopidnadon from the "typical" Arab raid. It marks, however, a recommencement of large-scale border warfare after the relative lull since 782, which continued unabated until Harun's death in 809 and the subsequent Abbasid civil war.

Perhaps the most long-term consequence of the battle was the death of the tourmarches Diogenes: by virtue of his unusual prominence in Theophanes's account, Henri Grégoire identified this Diogenes with the original archetype for the later epic hero Digenes Akritas.

== Sources ==
- Beck, Hans Georg (1971). Geschichte der Byzantinischen Volksliteratur (in German). Munich: Verlag C. H. Beck. ISBN 3-406-01420-8.
- Brooks, E. W. (1923). "Chapter V. (A) The Struggle with the Saracens (717–867)". In Bury, J.B. (ed.). The Cambridge Medieval History, Vol. IV: The Eastern Roman Empire (717–1453). Cambridge: Cambridge University Press. pp. 119–138.
- Lilie, Ralph-Johannes (1996). Byzanz unter Eirene und Konstantin VI. (780–802) (in German). Frankfurt am Main: Peter Lang. ISBN 3-631-30582-6.
- Makrypoulias, Christos (2008). "Battle at Kopidnadon, 788". Encyclopaedia of the Hellenic World, Asia Minor. Athens: Foundation of the Hellenic World. Archived from the original on 26 June 2015.
- Treadgold, Warren (1988). The Byzantine Revival, 780–842. Stanford, California: Stanford University Press. ISBN 978-0-8047-1462-4.
