= Gökbez, Pozantı =

Gökbez
- Neighbourhood
- Location in Turkey
- Coordinates: 37°26′24″N 34°52′48″E
- Country: Turkey
- Province: Adana
- District: Pozantı
- Population (2022): 1,000
- Time zone: UTC+3 (TRT)

Gökbez is a neighbourhood in the municipality and district of Pozantı, Adana Province, Turkey. Its population is 1,000 (2022).
