= Pozantı =

- District and municipality
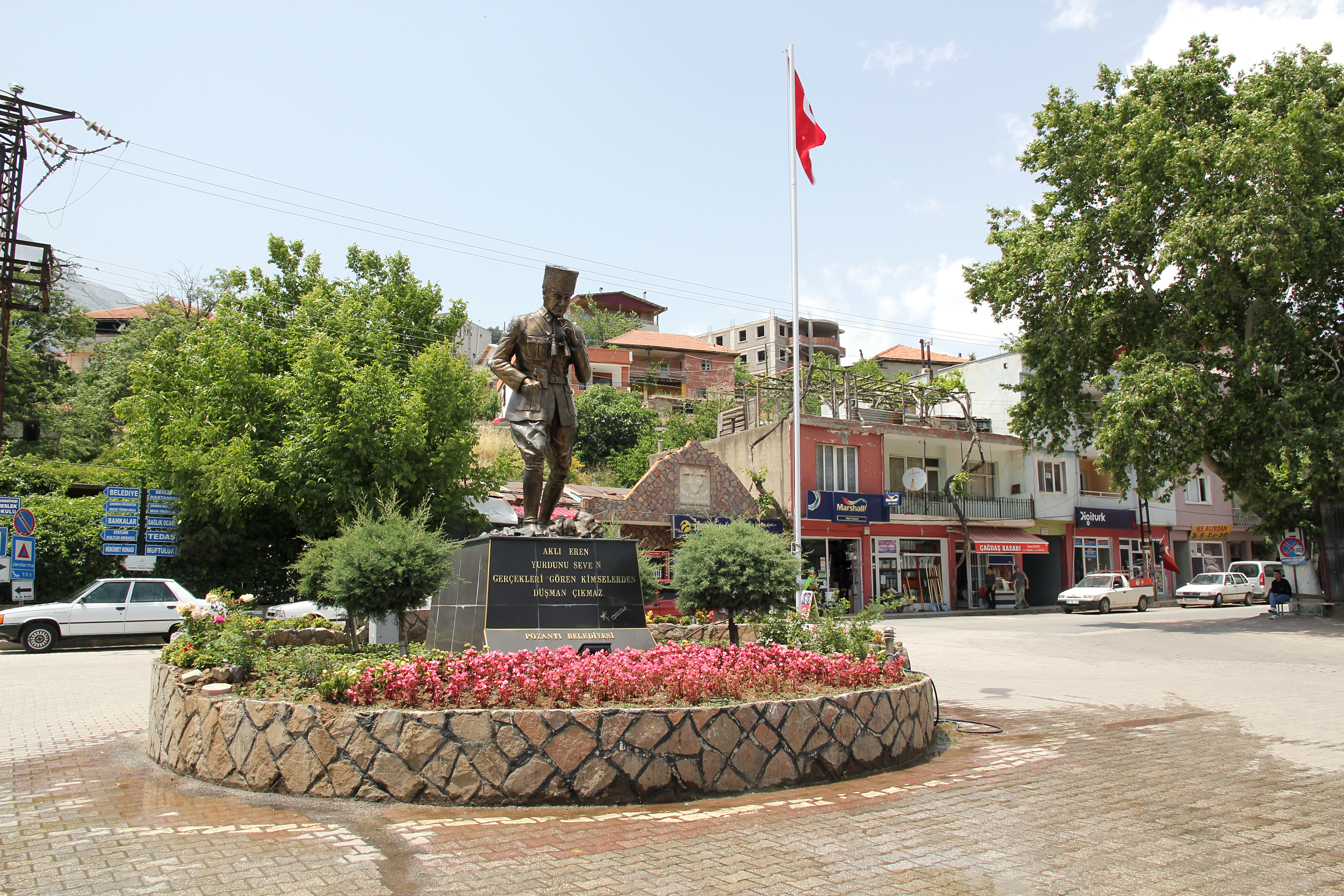

- Map showing Pozantı District in Adana Province

- Location within Turkey
- Coordinates: 37°25′40″N 34°52′16″E
- Country: Turkey
- Province: Adana

Government
  - Mayor: Ali Avan (MHP)
- Area: 899 km^{2} (347 sq mi)
- Elevation: 780 m (2,560 ft)
- Population (2022): 19,852
  - Density: 22.1/km^{2} (57.2/sq mi)
- Time zone: UTC+3 (TRT)
- Area code: 0322
- Website: www.pozanti.bel.tr

Pozantı (Greek: Πενδοσις, romanized: Pendhòsis, formerly Arabic: الْبَدَندُون, romanized: el-Bedendûn) is a municipality and district of Adana Province, Turkey. Its area is 899 km^{2}, and its population is 19,852 (2022). The town is in the highlands of Çukurova, and is a major gateway to the Mediterranean coasts. Pozantı stands in the foothills, at the bottom of one of the few passes through the mountains. The mayor is Ali Avan (MHP).

== History ==
Pozantı has had a number of names. In antiquity it was Pendonsis or Pendosis, to the Arabs El Bedendum, and finally Bozantı and Pozantı in Turkish.

Standing at the entrance to a pass across the Taurus Mountains, Pendonsis was strategically important, as the gateway between the high plain of Anatolia and the low plain of Cilicia or Çukurova and the Middle East beyond. Pozantı has passed through the hands of Hittites, Persians, Alexander the Great, Rome and Byzantium. Muslim forces moved through the area in the period of the Abbasids, followed by the Turks after the Battle of Manzikert in 1071. During the Crusades, control of the pass was returned to the Byzantines, then the Armenian Kingdom of Cilicia and the Mamluks, before finally being brought under Ottoman control by Selim I in 1517.

Pozantı is windy and bleak, and for most of its history was a fort and a road-house, but more people began to live in the area permanently when a railway was built in 1917. However, passing trade on the road is still a major driver of the local economy.

Pozantı was briefly occupied by French forces at the end of World War I.

== Composition ==
There are 21 neighbourhoods in Pozantı District:

- Akçatekir
- Alpu
- Aşçıbekirli
- Belemedik
- Çamlıbel
- Cumhuriyet
- Dağdibi
- Eskikonacık
- Fındıklı
- Gökbez
- Hamidiye
- İstiklal
- Kamışlı
- Karakışlakçı
- Kurtuluş
- Ömerli
- Yağlıtaş
- Yazıcık
- Yenikonacık
- Yukarıbelemedik
- Zafer

== Transportation ==
Pozantı Gar is the railway station of Pozantı, served by three main line services, connecting Pozantı to Adana, Niğde, Kayseri, Ankara and Karaman.

As the gateway to Çukurova, Pozantı is a stopping point for several coach companies that operate routes from Central Anatolia to Çukurova and further east.

== Landmarks ==
The only historical building in the city center is the mosque and fountain of Ottoman general Cemal Paşa, built in 1919 and since repaired and extended. At the entrance to the pass are the old and new castles of Anhşa.

The Casemates of İbrahim Pasha, the remains of a 19th-century fort, are located on the hill named Tekir, next to the modern highway D.750. The ruins of the Byzantine town of Fenese lay near the village of Aşçıbekirli. More ruins have been found near the village of Kamışlı in the high meadows (yayla) of Ören and Asar.

== See also ==
- Padyandus
- Belemedik
