= Belemedik =

- Neighbourhood
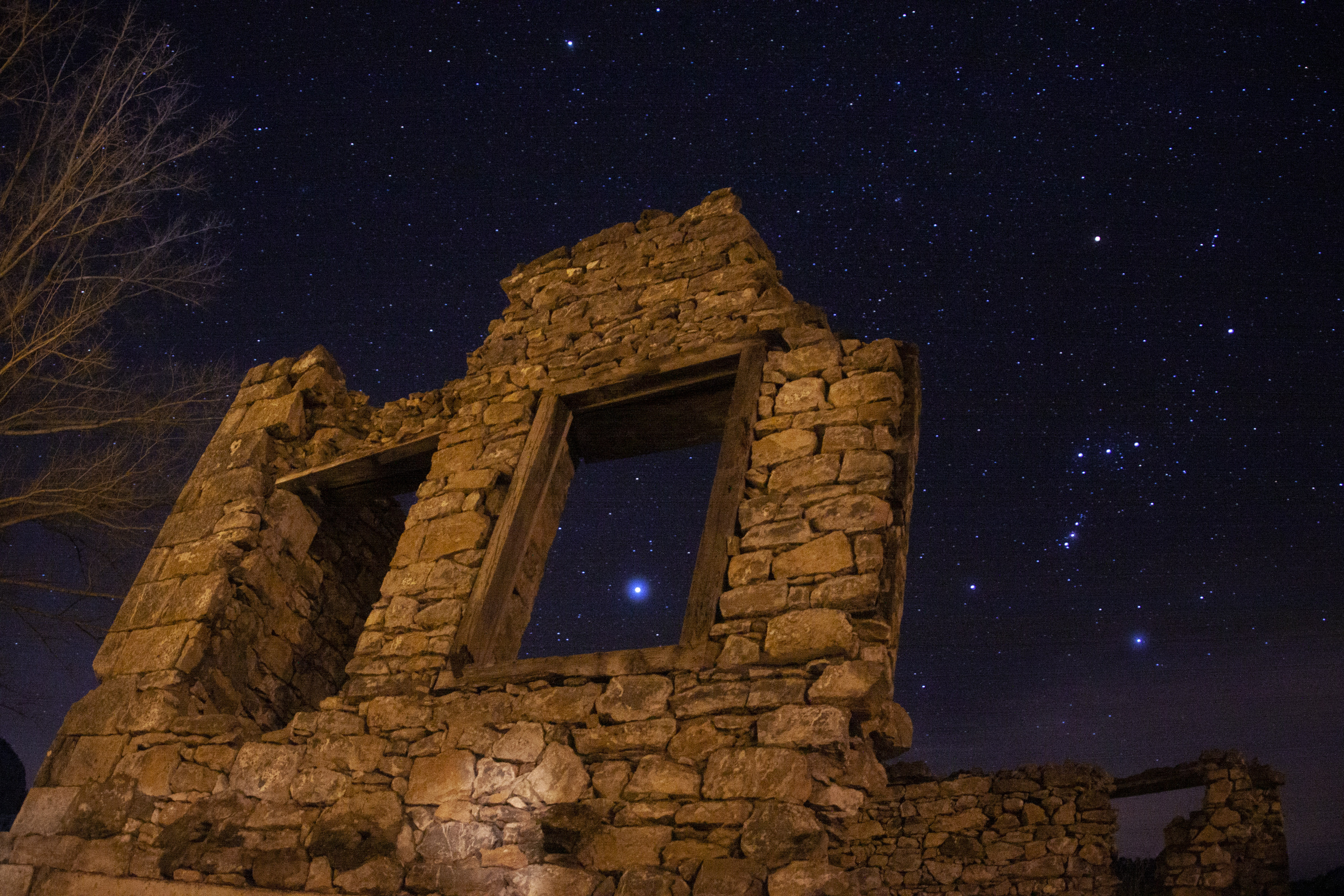

- Location within Turkey
- Coordinates: 37°21′N 34°54′E
- Country: Turkey
- Province: Adana
- District: Pozantı
- Elevation: 700 m (2,300 ft)
- Population (2022): 77
- Time zone: UTC+3 (TRT)
- Postal code: 01470
- Area code: 0322

Belemedik is a neighbourhood in the municipality and district of Pozantı, Adana Province, Turkey. Its population is 77 (2022). It was one of the important settlements on Toros Mountains during the early years of the 20th century and especially the World War I years. The village is inhabited by Tahtacı.

== Geography ==
Belemedik is a secluded mountain village situated at the west bank of Çakıt River ( a tributary of the Seyhan River) in Toros Mountains. The only means of access to Belemedik is via a road from Pozantı at the north. Distance to Pozantı is 12 kilometres (7.5 mi) and to Adana to the south is 122 kilometres (76 mi). The altitude of the village at the river bank is about 700 metres (2,300 ft) with respect to sea level.

== History ==
In the early years of the 20th century, the population of the village was of Turkmen origin, also called Tahtacı ("wood workers"), referring to their employment in forestry. In 1907 Belemedik became the center of railroad construction activities of the Philipp Holzmann company within the scope of Berlin-Baghdad Railway, one of the most prestigious transportation projects of the early 20th century. The population of the village increased by the influx of Turks as well as the German construction workers. During the seven years of construction 41 Germans died of natural causes and they were buried in Belemedik. After the World War I Belemedik, like other settlements around Çukurova, was occupied by the French Army. The headquarters of the French mountain troops was in Pozantı and nearby Belemedik was used as a site for military hospital. The commander's wife Mme. Mesnil was working as a nurse in the hospital. However, Turkish nationalists captured Belemedik on 10 April 1920. On 28 May the rest of the French troops also surrendered during the battle of Karboğazı. French soldiers including Major and Mme. Mesnil were held captive up to 25 September 1921. During the rest of the war, the hospital in Belemedik was used by the Turkish nationalists. After the war, Belemedik continued to be a stop on the railroad. But because of the lack of agricultural land and landslips in 1969, the population decreased sharply.

== Present day Belemedik ==
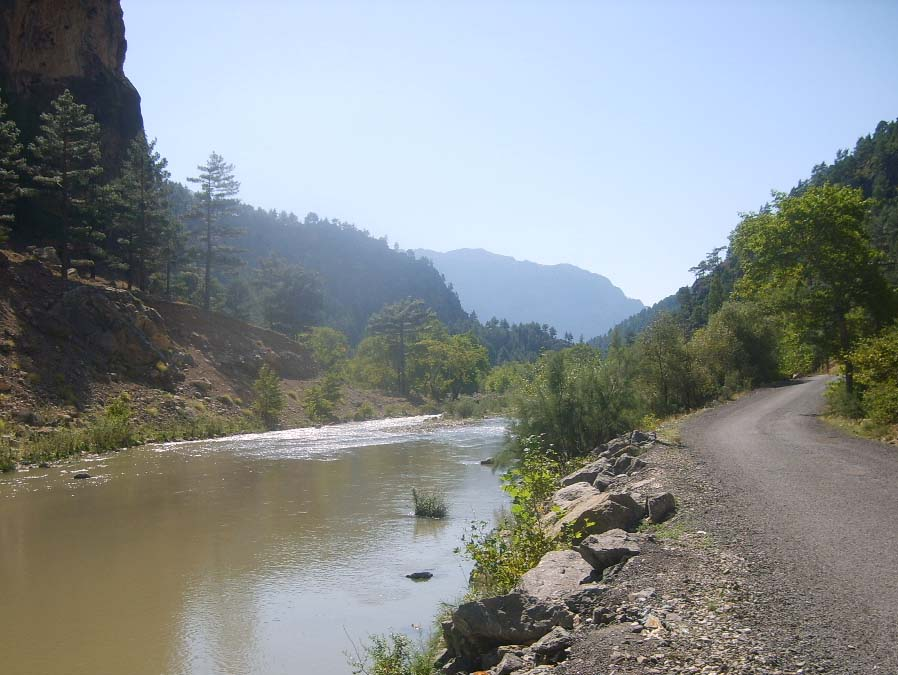
A few kilometers north of the village

The few people still staying in Belemedik are retired people. Although the few residents enjoy a picturesque scenery and clean air, because of the lack of dwellings, Belemedik is not considered as a yayla (resort).

== Trivia ==
Former name of the village was Karapınar. However, during the railway construction years Belemedik replaced the former name. According to one source the name of the village is the corrupt form of the Turkish word Bilemedik meaning We couldn't guess. During the railway construction, each tunnel was bored by two teams working at the opposite sides of the tunnel. The teams were required to meet at the midpoint. When for any reason, one team failed to accomplish the task, the excuse was the word bilemedik and in German pronunciation it became belemedik.
