= Gülek =

- Neighbourhood
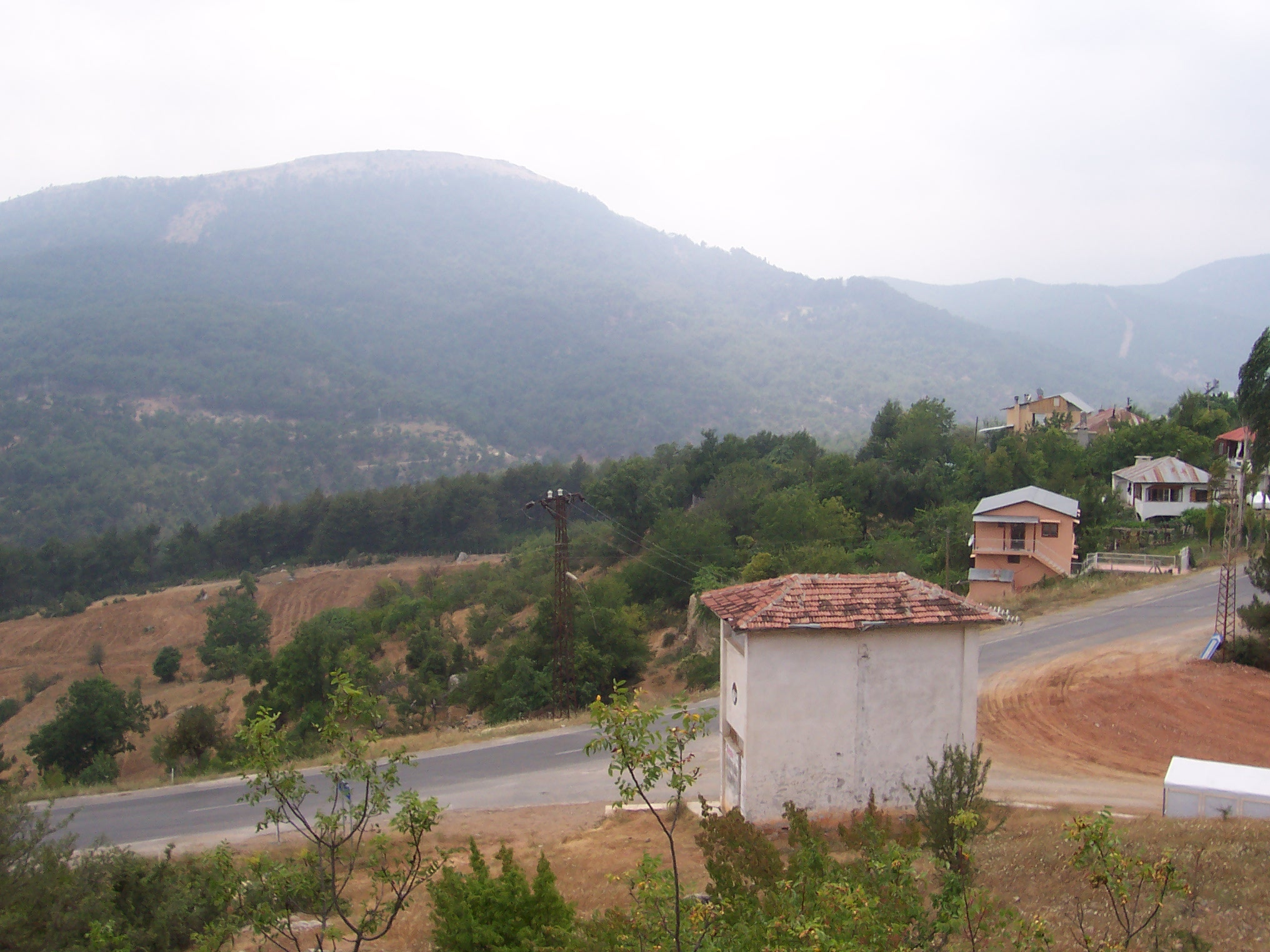

- Location within Turkey
- Coordinates: 37°15′N 34°46′E
- Country: Turkey
- Province: Mersin
- District: Tarsus
- Elevation: 1,150 m (3,770 ft)
- Population (2022): 1,483
- Time zone: UTC+3 (TRT)
- Postal code: 33404
- Area code: 0324

Gülek is a neighbourhood in the municipality and district of Tarsus, Mersin Province, Turkey. Its population is 1,483 (2022). Before the 2013 reorganisation, it was a town (belde).

== Geography ==
Gülek is situated along a valley on the Taurus Mountains. The main pass of these mountains, which is known as Gülek Pass (ancient Cilician Gates), is just east of the town. The average altitude of the town is about 1,150 metres (3,770 ft).

== Administration ==
Gülek is a part of Tarsus district, which is itself a part of Mersin province. Gülek was a village in the first half of the 20th century. It became the seat of its township in 1954.

== History ==
Macedonian emperor Alexander the Great (reigned 336–323 BC) crossed the Taurus mountains through the Cilician Gates during his campaign against Darius III (reigned 336–330 BC) of the Achaemenid Empire. Gülek citizens believe that the ancient inscriptions in the pass were erected by Alexander. But, actually, these inscriptions were erected much later by the Roman Emperor Caracalla (reigned 211–217) during his campaign against the Parthian Empire. The town (then known as Hins Bwls) was established during the Byzantine era. In 652 Umayyad armies annexed Gülek and surrounding territory. From 861, Gülek fell under the rule of many states, including the Byzantine Empire, the Sultanate of Rum, Armenian Kingdom of Cilicia, and the Ramadanids. In 1517, sultan Selim I (reigned 1512–1520) of the Ottoman Empire annexed Gülek. In 1832, Gülek was briefly occupied by the forces of the rebellious Muhammad Ali Pasha of Egypt but was returned to Ottoman control after the convention of Kütahya. After the First World War, French forces tried to occupy Gülek, but after the local militia forces from Gülek ambushed the French forces on 27 May 1920 at the pass of Karboğazı, the French army gave up this project. During the Turkish Republic era the name of the settlement was Panzinçukuru and Yaylaçukuru up to 1954. In 1954 the settlement was declared a seat of township and renamed to Gülek.

Above the Cilician Gates and a few kilometers from the village is Gülek Kalesi (Armenian: Kuklak; Arab: Kawlāk), a large fortification of considerable antiquity which retains evidence of Byzantine and Arab periods of occupation, but is primarily a construction of the 12th and 13th centuries attached to the Armenian Kingdom of Cilicia. Its circuit walls and towers at the south and west cover a distance of over 450 meters. An extensive photographic survey and plan of Gülek Castle was made between 1973 and 1979.
