= Akçatekir =

Settlement in Turkey

- Neighbourhood
- Location in Turkey
- Coordinates: 37°23′N 34°50′E
- Country: Turkey
- Province: Adana
- District: Pozantı
- Elevation: 1,250 m (4,100 ft)
- Population (2022): 1,622
- Time zone: UTC+3 (TRT)
- Area code: 0322

Akçatekir is a neighbourhood of the municipality and district of Pozantı, Adana Province, Turkey. Its population is 1,622 (2022). Before the 2013 reorganisation, it was a town (belde).

== Geography ==
Akçatekir is 11 kilometres (6.8 mi) from Pozantı and 85 kilometres (53 mi) from Adana. Akçatekir is situated along the valley of Çakıt on the Taurus Mountains at an altitude of about 1,250 metres (4,100 ft).

== History ==
The earliest settlements date back to 200 years ago. A sheikh from Turkestan founded a village which is slightly outside the present town. After the roads were constructed, the town was established in its present location. There were two quarters, in Akça (western portion) villagers lived all year long and in Bürücek (eastern portion) city dwellers (mainly from Adana and Tarsus) spent the summers, escaping from the heat of Çukurova (Cilicia).

During Egyptian revolt in the first half of the 19th century, Egyptian armies briefly occupied Akçatekir. Ibrahim Pasha of Egypt built a fort in 1833 which is now known as the Bastion of İbrahim Pasha (İbrahim Paşa Tabyası).

== Economy ==
Akçatekir had long been known as a summer resort town (so called yayla). But now it is on the motorway and the transportation to the cities at the south is a simple matter. So even in winters, people who work in the cities may prefer to settle in Akçatekir.
