= Cilician Gates =

Pass through the Taurus Mountains

- Gülek Boğazı
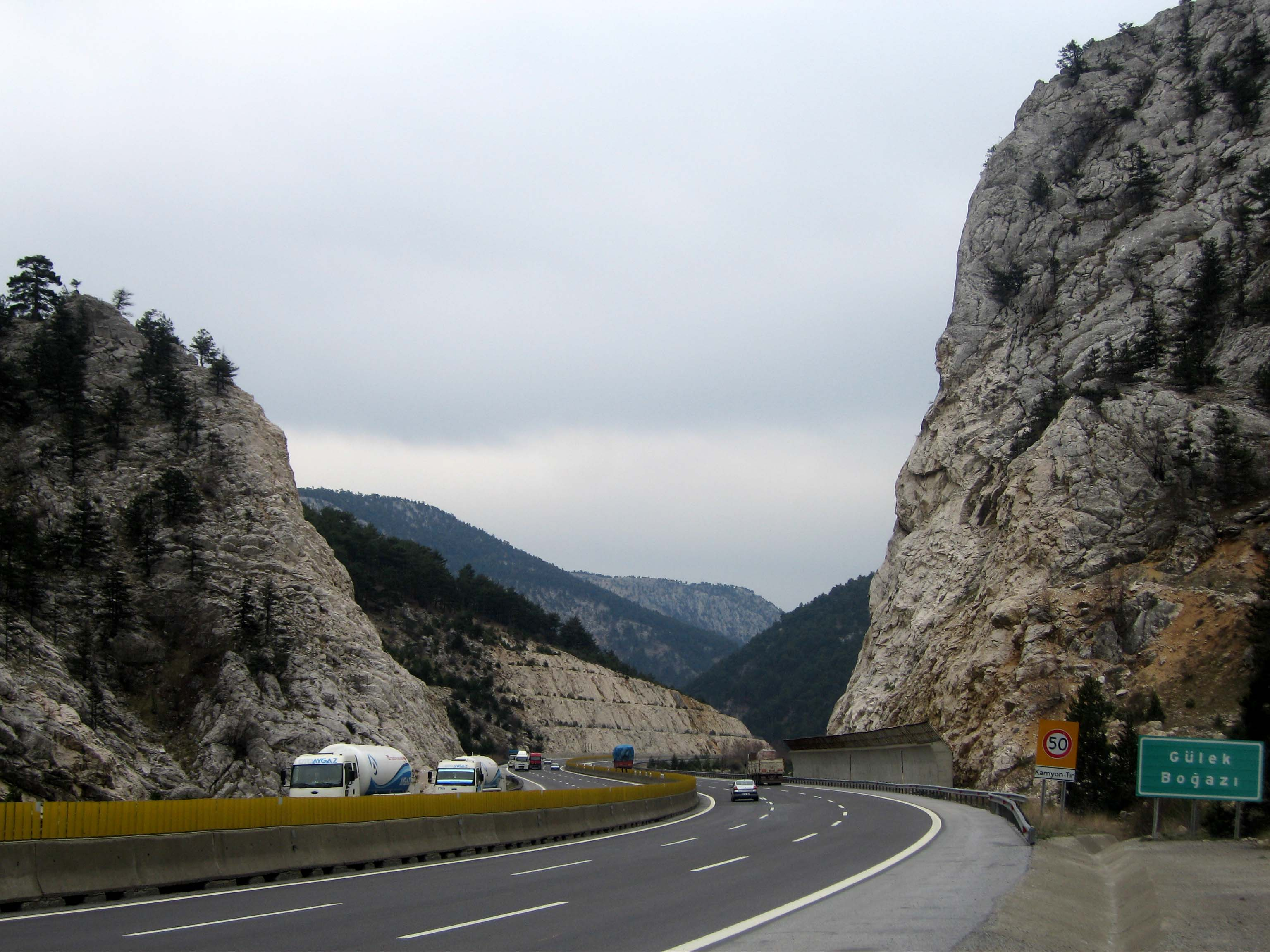
- Gülek Pass

- Location within Turkey
- Elevation: 1,050 m (3,440 ft)
- Traversed by: O-21 / E90

Third Approach
- Location: Mersin Province, Turkey
- Range: Taurus Mountains
- Coordinates: 37°17′07″N 34°47′10″E

The Cilician Gates or Gülek Pass is a pass through the Taurus Mountains connecting the low plains of Cilicia to the Anatolian Plateau, by way of the narrow gorge of the Gökoluk River. Its highest elevation is about 1,000 metres (3,300 ft).

The Cilician Gates have been a major commercial and military artery for millennia. In the early 20th century, a narrow-gauge railway was built through them, and today, the Tarsus-Ankara Highway (E90, O-21) passes through them.

The southern end of the Cilician gates is about 44 kilometres (27 mi) north of Tarsus and the northern end leads to Cappadocia.

== History ==
Yumuktepe (modern Mersin), which guards the Adana side of the gateway, with 23 layers of occupation, is at 4,500 BCE, one of the oldest fortified settlements in the world. The ancient pathway was a track for mule caravans, not wheeled vehicles. The Hittites, Greeks, Alexander the Great, the Romans, Byzantines, Sasanians, Mongols, and the Crusaders of the First Crusade have all traveled this route during their campaigns. The Bible testifies that Saint Paul of Tarsus and Silas went this way as they went through Syria and Cilicia. The Book of Galatians speaks of the cities of Derbe, Lystra, and Iconium - cities visited by Paul on his first journey (Acts 14; Gal. 1:2), with the purpose of strengthening their churches, at the beginning of the second preaching journey (Acts 15:40-41).

The distance from the Anatolian plateau to the Cilician plain is about 110 kilometres (68 mi). In ancient times, this was a journey of nearly five days. Saint Paul spoke, according to the Bible, about being in "dangers from rivers" and "dangers from robbers" (2 Cor. 11:26). This may explain why one of the world's oldest fortresses was built at the southeastern end of the Cilician Gates around 4500 BCE. The Army of the Ten Thousand, Alexander the Great before the Battle of Issus, Paul of Tarsus on his way to the Galatians, and part of the army of the First Crusade all passed through the Cilician Gates. The Crusaders allied themselves with the Armenian Kingdom of Cilicia.

Above the Gates to the southwest is Gülek Kalesi (Armenian: Kuklak; Arab: Kawlāk), a large fortification of considerable antiquity that retains evidence of Byzantine and Arab periods of occupation, but is primarily an Armenian construction of the 12th and 13th centuries. Its circuit walls and towers at the south and west cover a distance of over 450 meters. Below the Cilician Gates is the medieval Armenian fortress of Anahşa with its large horseshoe-shaped towers and three entrances. Also in the vicinity of the Gates is a fort built in the 1830s by Ibrahim Pasha of Egypt during his Syrian campaign against the Ottoman Empire.

When German engineers were working on the Baghdad Railway between Istanbul and Baghdad, they were unable to follow the steep-pitched, narrow, and tightly winding ancient track through the Gates. The series of viaducts and tunnels they built are among the marvels of railroad engineering; this route actually follows an ancient secondary road southeast from Pozantı, below Anahşa Dağı with its medieval Armenian fortress. The railroad was opened in 1918; the narrow-gauge working line moved Ottoman troops and war material to the Mesopotamian front in the closing months of World War I.

== See also ==
- Battle of the Cilician Gates
- Cilicia
- Cilicia (satrapy)
- Gülek
- Caspian Gates
