= Loulon =

Fortress near the modern village of Hasangazi in Turkey

Luluon Castle
- Ulukışla, Türkiye

Site information
- Type: Fortress

Location
- Location within Turkey
- Coordinates: 37°34′59″N 34°41′56″E
- Height: 2000 m

Loulon (Greek: Λοῦλον), in Arabic known as Lu'lu'a (Arabic: لولوة), was a fortress near the modern village of Hasangazi in Turkey.

The site was of strategic importance as it controlled the northern exit of the Cilician Gates. In the 8th–9th centuries it was located on the border between the Byzantine Empire and the Arab Caliphate and played a prominent role in the Arab–Byzantine wars of the period, changing hands several times.

== Location ==
The Scottish scholar W. M. Ramsay identified the fortress as a 300-metre high steep hill fortress west of the modern village of Porsuk in the Çakit valley, but modern scholars identify it with the 2,100-metre tall rocky hill some 13 km north of Porsuk, lying between the modern villages of Çanakçi and Gedelli. The identification is supported by ruins of walls encompassing an area of 40 x 60 metres and traces of barracks and cisterns on the hilltop dating to the 9th–12th centuries, as well as by an unobstructed view to Hasan Dağ, which is commonly identified with Mount Argaios, the second in the line of beacons that linked Loulon with the Byzantine capital Constantinople.

== History ==
Loulon appears to have been settled by the citizens of the nearby town of Faustinopolis (originally called Halala), which was apparently abandoned during the early Muslim attacks into Asia Minor. Ramsay and other writers assumed that the medieval name "Loulon" reflected the earlier name of Faustinopolis, but recent scholarship attributes its origin to the Hittite name "Lolas" for the local mountain range.

Loulon was one of many other similar forts on both sides of the Taurus–Antitaurus range, along which the frontier between Byzantium and the Caliphate ran, but was of particular importance during the long Arab–Byzantine wars as it controlled the northern exit of the Cilician Gates and the main road linking the Byzantine town of Tyana with the Arab-held town of Tarsus in Cilicia. In addition, it served to guard the mines of the area, which were exploited for the minting of coins and the production of weapons. Among Byzantine writers, Loulon was particularly notable as the southernmost of a line of nine beacons that stretched across Asia Minor and relayed messages from the frontier to Constantinople. The system was devised by Leo the Mathematician under Emperor Theophilos (reigned 829–842): two identical clocks were installed on Loulon and the lighthouse of the Great Palace of Constantinople, and messages sent on each of the twelve hours corresponded to a specific message. The Byzantine sources report that Michael III (r. 842–867) discontinued the system for a frivolous reason, but this is likely a tale invented to denigrate him by later writers, sympathetic to the succeeding Macedonian dynasty. Arab authors knew the fortress as Lu'lu'a, but it is also identified by modern researchers with the Arabic sources' Hisn al-Saqaliba, the "Fortress of the Slavs", possibly in reference to a garrison of Slavs—often defectors from Byzantine ranks—installed there by the Caliphs.

According to the Arab historians, Loulon was captured by the Abbasid Caliph Harun al-Rashid (r. 785–809). The date is given as 805, but as Ramsay writes, the fact that after 782—before the beginning of Harun's reign—the Arabs had been able to cross the Cilician Gates at will makes it possible that the fortress had already been captured then. The fortress was recovered by the Byzantines sometime after 811, but in September 832, its garrison surrendered to the Caliph al-Ma'mun (r. 813–833) after a lengthy siege. In late 859, Emperor Michael III tried to bribe the fort's garrison, left unpaid by the Caliph, into surrendering Loulon to him. The garrison was initially receptive, but when the emperor sent one of his officers to take control in March 860, he was taken prisoner and handed over to the Caliph. It was not until 878, under Emperor Basil I the Macedonian (r. 867–886), that Loulon was definitely retaken by the Byzantines, when once again the garrison was left unpaid, as the Arab governor of Tarsus, Urkhuz, embezzled the money raised for their salary. It henceforth remained in Byzantine hands until Asia Minor was overrun by the Seljuk Turks.

Between 1216 and 1218, Seljuk sultan Kaykaus I captured the town from the Armenian Kingdom of Cilicia. The Seljuks strengthened its fortifications and made it an important way station on the road between Sis and Kayseri. Owing to the region's rich silver deposits, the town became an important mint in the second half of the 13th century. Both the Seljuks of Rûm and the Ilkhanids minted silver coins in the town under the mint name Lu'lu'a.

The fortress played a role in the conflicts between the Ottoman Empire and the Mamluks of Egypt in the late 15th century, when the frontier between the two empires ran along the Taurus Mountains, paralleling the old Arab–Byzantine border: Lu'lu'a served as the advanced Ottoman outpost, and the fortress of Gülek served as the advanced Mamluk outpost on the other side of the border.

== Sources ==
- Brooks, E. W. (1923). "Chapter V. (A) The Struggle with the Saracens (717–867)". The Cambridge Medieval History, Vol. IV: The Eastern Roman Empire (717–1453). Cambridge: Cambridge University Press. pp. 119–138.
- Brubaker, Leslie; Haldon, John (2011). Byzantium in the Iconoclast Era, c.680–850: A History. Cambridge University Press. ISBN 978-0-521-43093-7.
- Bury, John Bagnell (1912). A History of the Eastern Roman Empire from the Fall of Irene to the Accession of Basil I (A.D. 802–867). London: Macmillan and Co.
- Cahen, Claude (1968). Pre-Ottoman Turkey: A general survey of the material and spiritual culture and history c. 1071-1330. New York: Taplinger. hdl:2027/heb.00871. ISBN 1-59740-456-X.
- Diler, Ömer; Hinrichs, Johann-Christoph (2009). Islamic Mints (İslam darp yerleri). Vol. 2. Istanbul: Spink. ISBN 978-975-8428-18-2.
- Har-El, Shai (1995). Struggle for Domination in the Middle East: The Ottoman-Mamluk War, 1485-91. Leiden, New York, Köln: BRILL. ISBN 90-04-10180-2.
- Hild, Friedrich (1977). Das byzantinische Strassensystem in Kappadokien (in German). Vienna: Verlag der Österreichischen Akademie der Wissenschaften. ISBN 3-7001-0168-6.
- Ramsay, W. M. (2010) [1890]. The Historical Geography of Asia Minor. Cambridge and New York: Cambridge University Press. ISBN 978-1-108-01453-3.
- Toynbee, Arnold (1973). Constantine Porphyrogenitus and His World. Oxford University Press. ISBN 0-19-215253-X.
