= Bolkar Mountains =

Mountain range in Turkey

Coordinates: 37.2480°N 34.3643°E

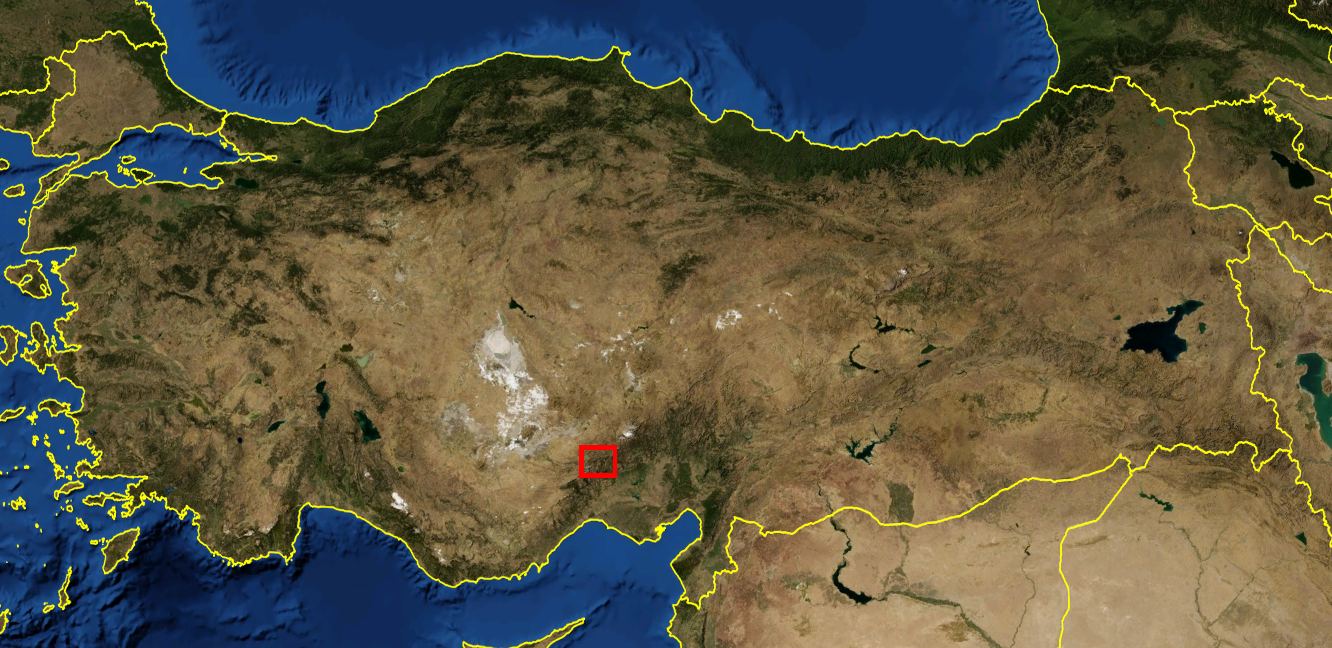

Highest point
- Peak: Medetsiz
- Elevation: 3,524 m (11,562 ft)

Dimensions
- Length: 70 km (43 mi)
- Width: 25 km (16 mi)

Geography
- Country: Turkey
- Region(s): Konya, Niğde and Mersin
- Parent range: Taurus Mountains

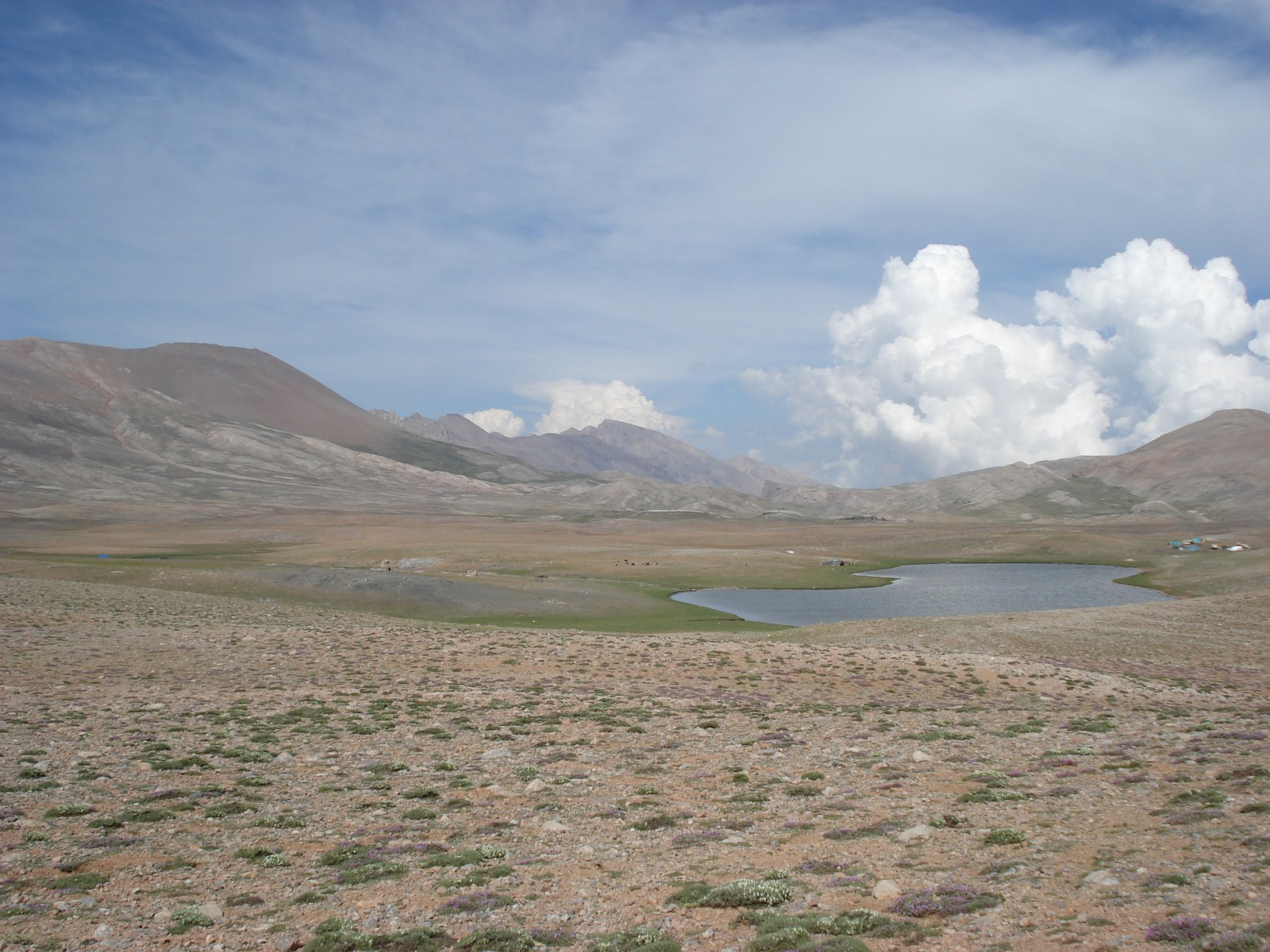
The highest peak, Mount Medetsiz

The Bolkar Mountains, also known as the Bulgar Dagh or Bolghar Dagh, are a mountain range, an extension of the Central Taurus Mountains in southern Turkey. The northern part lies in Niğde Province, while the southern part is in Mersin Province. The range has been designated both an Important Bird Area and a Key Biodiversity Area.

== Description ==
The range runs for 70 kilometres (43 mi) from the northeast to the southwest. Its elevation rises gradually from west to east, peaking in the northeast.

The mountains are composed mainly of hard Permo-Carboniferous limestone, as well as dolomites. There are vast numbers of karsts; according to one journal article, there are "30,132 karstic depressions identified are located at elevations between 1315 and 2525 m". Valleys (including cirques created by glacial erosion) and canyons can be up to 1,500 metres (4,900 ft) deep.

There are numerous peaks over 3,000 metres (9,800 ft), the tallest being Mount Medetsiz at 3,524 metres (11,562 ft).

== Flora and fauna ==
It was designated a Key Biodiversity Area in 2016. Its location in the transition zone between the Eastern Mediterranean and the Central Anatolia regions and its "diversifıed geomorphological structure" has made it "one of Turkey's most unique areas in terms of natural life and rare species".

The southern slopes receive greater rainfall from the Mediterranean and support Mediterranean flora. The northern slopes, on the other hand, are subject to the Central Anatolian climate.

Birds include:

- bearded vulture (Gypaetos barbatus)
- Egyptian vulture (Neophron percnopterus)
- black kite (Milvus migrans)
- Caspian snowcock (Tetraogallus caspius)

Some of the many resident animal species are:

- Long-legged wood frog (Rana Holtzi)
- Lathyrus cilicicus, endangered globally and on the IUCN Red List
- Flueggea anatolica, endangered globally and on the IUCN Red List
- Onychogomphus assimilis, a butterfly considered vulnerable
- Montivipera bulgardaghica, a venomous viper species that originated from this mountain range

== History ==
The 17th century BC Hittite king Ḫattušili I occupied the region; it provided access from central Anatolia to the Mediterranean Sea coast.

The nomadic Yörüks have inhabited the area for thousands of years.

== Mining ==
In the early 20th-century, the mountains were noted as having large amounts of lead. A mine active in the region since 1825 was Bulgar Maden. As of 1920, it was still producing lead as a Turkish government-run enterprise. The ore from this mine was 44.2% lead. Silver and gold were occasionally found in the mines. The mine used an inefficient smelting technique, which often threatened the quality of the product, leaving much of it lost. The gold and silver were sent to Istanbul for smelting.
