= İmrahor, Ulukışla =

İmrahor
- Village
- Location within Turkey Location within Turkey Central Anatolia
- Coordinates: 37°39′55″N 34°44′40″E
- Country: Turkey
- Province: Niğde
- District: Ulukışla
- Population (2022): 208
- Time zone: UTC+3 (TRT)

İmrahor is a village in the Ulukışla District of Niğde Province, Turkey. Its population is 208 (2022). It is located near the ruins of the site of ancient Faustinopolis, which lies closer to the nearby village of Başmakçı. Fruit farming is the main source of income, and the village is famous for its cherries and apples. Decreasing water resources have recently caused problems, leading to including emigration of the younger generation from the village.

The climate is dry and the vegetation typical of the dry steppes of central Anatolia, summers are hot and dry, winters are cold and it snows. Wheat is grown in the valley.

== History ==
There are burial mounds, höyük and other signs of occupation going back to the Hittites and even earlier. The area was later occupied by Phrygians and Romans.
