= 1962 Taurus Mountains Turkish Airlines F-27 crash =

1962 aircraft accident in Turkey

Coordinates: 37.469°N 34.611°E

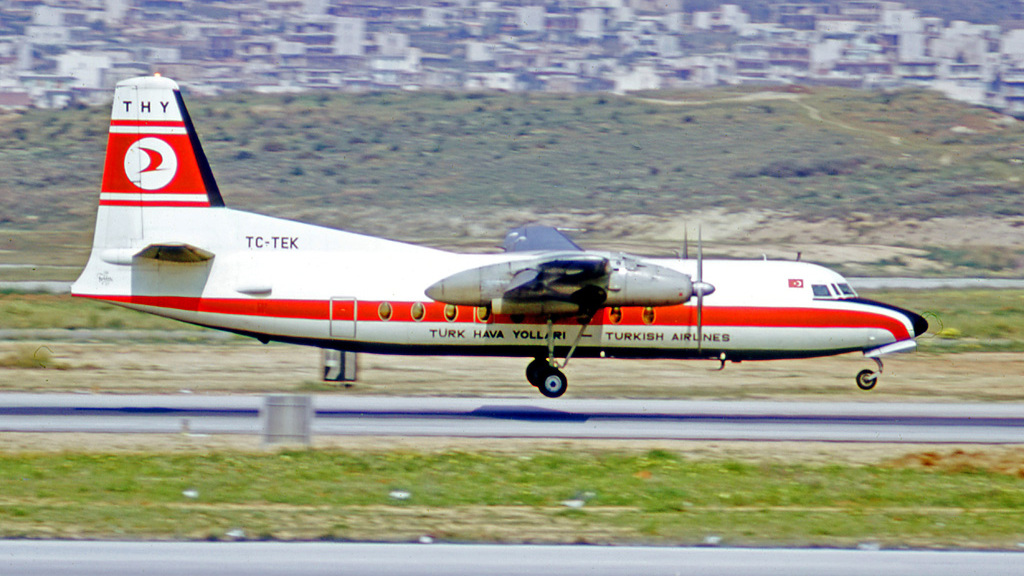
- A Fairchild F-27 of Turkish Airlines, similar to the one that crashed

Accident
- Date: 8 March 1962
- Summary: Controlled flight into terrain
- Site: Mount Medetsiz, Niğde, Turkey

Aircraft
- Aircraft type: Fairchild F-27
- Operator: Turkish Airlines
- Registration: TC-KOP
- Flight origin: Yeşilköy Airport, Istanbul, Turkey
- Stopover: Esenboğa Airport, Ankara, Turkey
- Destination: Adana Airport, Adana, Turkey
- Passengers: 8
- Crew: 3
- Fatalities: 11
- Survivors: 0

On 8 March 1962, a Fairchild F-27 of Turkish Airlines crashed into Mount Medetsiz in the Taurus Mountains range while en route from Ankara Esenboğa Airport to Adana Airport, killing all eight passengers and three crew members on board. The flight took an unusual route directly through the mountain range and encountered cumulus clouds during descend into Adana, causing the flight crew to navigate around them. It is believed that the pilots lost track of their location and altitude while doing so, causing the plane to crash into the bottom of an abyss in the mountains. The location of the wreckage and harsh weather conditions prevented the rescue team from reaching the accident site before 11 March.

== Aircraft and crew ==
The aircraft involved in the accident was a Fairchild F-27 registered as TC-KOP with serial number 83. The aircraft had made its first flight in 1960 and had a valid airworthiness certificate. The captain and pilot in command of the flight was Nejat Aksan, while the co-pilot was Zülfikar Kaya. Emel Kiper was the sole cabin crew member on board; she was replacing another flight attendant who had gotten sick. According to the final report, the crew was properly licensed.

== Accident ==
The flight originated from Istanbul Yeşilköy Airport and was heading to Adana Airport with a stopover at Ankara Esenboğa Airport. The aircraft took off from Ankara for the second leg of the flight at 16:28 local time (14:28 GMT) without taking any new passengers.

Civilian flights from Ankara to Adana would usually take a western detour via Konya and Silifke to avoid the Taurus Mountains. However, the flight crew started heading directly towards Adana, a flight path which was only reserved for military aircraft. At 17:28, the pilots contacted the controller at the Incirlik Air Base to report that they were at an altitude of 17,500 feet (5,300 m) and requested clearance to approach Adana. They also told that they were flying around cumulus clouds and changing their altitude accordingly to avoid turbulence. The controller cleared the aircraft to descend to 5,000 feet (1,500 m) and told the pilots to notify the tower when passing through 8,000 feet (2,400 m) and 7,000 feet (2,100 m). No further communication was received from the aircraft.

The aircraft crashed at 17:43 local time at 6,800 feet (2,100 m) above sea level into Mount Medetsiz, around 47 nautical miles (87 km) from the airport. The wreckage was located at the bottom of a deep abyss near the villages of Madenköy and Gümüşköy in the Ulukışla District of Niğde, scattered around a large area. The aircraft split into three main pieces upon impact.

== Victims and recovery ==
Nationalities of victims
Country	Pax	Crew	Total
Turkey	6	3	9
United States	2	-	2
Total	8	3	11

There were three crew members and eight passengers on board the airplane. Two passengers were from the United States; they were employed by a construction company based in Mersin. The crash site was first located by a helicopter two days after the accident. A team of 15 British mountaineers and ten Turkish Air Force privates got close to the wreckage on 10 March, but were unable to reach it due to its location down in the abyss as well as the strong winds and snow present that day. After spending the night in Madenköy, the team set out again the following morning with the help of local villagers to walk the last 5 miles (8.0 km) remaining to the wreckage. They reached the aircraft six hours later and found that the bodies were torn in pieces and badly burned, making identification impossible. Six bodies were taken out of the plane on 12 March, followed by three more on the next day.

=== Reincarnation theory ===
One of the passengers on the flight was Ahmet Delibalta, who was returning to Adana after searching for a female singer for his nightclub. Five days after the crash on 13 March, a boy named Erkan Kılıç was born in Adana. According to a book published by professor Ian Stevenson of the University of Virginia, Kılıç was afraid of seeing and hearing airplanes until the age of three. Stevenson claimed that soon after gaining ability to speak, Kılıç said that he was Delibalta, died in a plane crash and that he survived the initial impact, but later froze to death. He was able to correctly identify Delibalta's family members from photographs. Kılıç also identified Rengin Arda, the singer who was coming back to Adana with him and died in the accident.

== Cause ==
The two-page long final report was translated to English and released by the International Civil Aviation Organization (ICAO) in 1966. The report was only based on the initial findings made by the investigators, without discussion of evidence or analysis of the wreckage. The probable cause of the accident according to this report was:

"In avoiding cumulus cloud[s] and associated turbulent conditions, the pilot was not able to keep track of his exact position or to maintain exact altitude."

This explanation was re-affirmed in 1975, when Gündüz Sevilgen, a member of the 15th Parliament of Turkey from the National Salvation Party, wrote several questions to the Grand National Assembly of Turkey related to Turkish Airlines, including the causes of accidents. He received a response from the Minister of Transport, Sabahattin Özbek, on 18 March. The response included a short list of causes of all Turkish Airlines crashes to date. The cause for the Taurus crash in the response was:

"Hit the Taurus mountains due to bad weather, the plane heading to Adana crashed while trying to fly around the clouds and adjusting the altitude to the clouds."
