= March 8 =

March 8 this year in various calendars
- Sunday, 8 March 2026
Akan	Nkyikwasi
Armenian	21 Areg 1475
Aztec	Tecuilhuitontli 17, 6 Cōātl
Babylonian	18 Shabatu, 2336 SE
Balinese pawukon	Luang, Pepet, Kajeng, Sri, Wage, Urukung, Redite of Wayang, Ludra, Dadi, Raksasa
Bengali	23 Falgun, BS 1432
Chinese	Yin Metal Snake・Room Mansion; Fire Horse Year, Month 1, Day 20 (Jingzhe, 12 days until Chunfen)
Common Era	8 March 2026 CE
Coptic	29 Meshir, AM 1742
Egyptian	26 Epiphi, 2774 NE
Ethiopian	29 Yakātit, 2018 Amätä Məhrät
French Republican	Décade II, Octidi de Ventôse de l'Année 234 de la République
Gregorian	8 March, AD 2026
Hebrew	19 Adar, AM 5786
Hindu	Svātī・Dhruva; Solar: 24 Phālguna, 1947 SE; Lunisolar: Pañcamī, Kṛishna pakṣa of Phālguna, 2082 VE; Rāudra・5126 KY・1,872,642
Icelandic	Sunnudagur, 15 Góa 2025
Islamic	19 Ramadan, AH 1447 (using tabular method)
ISO week date	2026-W10-7
Japanese	20 Mutsuki, Reiwa 8 (Keichitsu, 12 days until Shunbun)
Julian	23 February, AD 2026 (AM 7534)
Julian day	2461108
Korean	20 Horangidal, 4359 DE
Maya	13.0.13.7.5; 3 Cumku, 6 Chicchan
Roman	ante diem VII Kalendas Martias, MMDCCLXXIX AUC
Solar Hijri	17 Esfand, SH 1404
Tibetan	20 mchu, me pho rta 2153 or 1772 or 1000

<<	March					>>
Su	Mo	Tu	We	Th	Fr	Sa
1	2	3	4	5	6	7
8	9	10	11	12	13	14
15	16	17	18	19	20	21
22	23	24	25	26	27	28
29	30	31
2026

March 8 in recent years
2026 (Sunday)
2025 (Saturday)
2024 (Friday)
2023 (Wednesday)
2022 (Tuesday)
2021 (Monday)
2020 (Sunday)
2019 (Friday)
2018 (Thursday)
2017 (Wednesday)

March 8 is the 67th day of the year (68th in leap years) in the Gregorian calendar; 298 days remain until the end of the year.

== Events ==
=== Pre-1600 ===
- 1010 – Ferdowsi completes his epic poem Shahnameh.
- 1126 – Following the death of his mother, queen Urraca of León, Alfonso VII is proclaimed king of León.
- 1262 – Battle of Hausbergen between bourgeois militias and the army of the bishop of Strasbourg.
- 1558 – The city of Pori (Swedish: Björneborg) is founded by Duke John on the shores of the Gulf of Bothnia.

=== 1601–1900 ===
- 1658 – Treaty of Roskilde: After a devastating defeat in the Northern Wars (1655–1661), Frederick III, the King of Denmark–Norway is forced to give up nearly half his territory to Sweden.
- 1702 – Queen Anne, the younger sister of Mary II, becomes Queen regnant of England, Scotland, and Ireland.
- 1722 – The Safavid Empire of Iran is defeated by an army from Afghanistan at the Battle of Gulnabad.
- 1736 – Nader Shah, founder of the Afsharid dynasty, is crowned Shah of Iran.
- 1775 – An anonymous writer, thought by some to be Thomas Paine, publishes "African Slavery in America", the first article in the American colonies calling for the emancipation of slaves and the abolition of slavery.
- 1782 – Gnadenhutten massacre: Ninety-six Native Americans in Gnadenhutten, Ohio, who had converted to Christianity, are killed by Pennsylvania militiamen in retaliation for raids carried out by other Indian tribes.
- 1801 – War of the Second Coalition: At the Battle of Abukir, a British force under Sir Ralph Abercromby lands in Egypt with the aim of ending the French campaign in Egypt and Syria.
- 1844 – King Oscar I ascends to the thrones of Sweden and Norway.
- 1844 – The Althing, the parliament of Iceland, is reopened after 45 years of closure.
- 1868 – Sakai incident: Japanese samurai kill 11 French sailors in the port of Sakai, Osaka.

=== 1901–present ===
- 1910 – French aviatrix Raymonde de Laroche becomes the first woman to receive a pilot's license.
- 1916 – World War I: A British force unsuccessfully attempts to relieve the siege of Kut (present-day Iraq) in the Battle of Dujaila.
- 1917 – International Women's Day protests in Petrograd mark the beginning of the February Revolution (February 23 in the Julian calendar).
- 1917 – The United States Senate votes to limit filibusters by adopting the cloture rule.
- 1921 – Spanish Prime Minister Eduardo Dato Iradier is assassinated while on his way home from the parliament building in Madrid.
- 1924 – A mine disaster kills 172 coal miners near Castle Gate, Utah.
- 1936 – Daytona Beach and Road Course holds its first oval stock car race.
- 1937 – Spanish Civil War: The Battle of Guadalajara begins.
- 1942 – World War II: The Dutch East Indies surrender Java to the Imperial Japanese Army.
- 1942 – World War II: Imperial Japanese Army forces capture Rangoon, Burma from the British.
- 1949 – President of France Vincent Auriol and ex-Vietnamese emperor Bảo Đại sign the Élysée Accords, giving Vietnam greater independence from France and creating the State of Vietnam to oppose Viet Minh-led Democratic Republic of Vietnam.
- 1950 – The iconic Volkswagen Type 2 "Bus" begins production.
- 1962 – A Turkish Airlines Fokker F27 Friendship crashes into Mount Medetsiz in the Taurus Mountains of Turkey, killing all 11 people on board.
- 1963 – The Ba'ath Party comes to power in Syria in a coup d'état.
- 1965 – Vietnam War: US Marines arrive at Da Nang.
- 1965 – Aeroflot Flight 513 crashes during takeoff from Kuybyshev Airport, killing 30 and injuring 9.
- 1966 – Nelson's Pillar in Dublin, Ireland, is destroyed by a bomb.
- 1979 – Philips demonstrates the compact disc publicly for the first time.
- 1979 – Images taken by Voyager 1 prove the existence of volcanoes on Io, a moon of Jupiter.
- 1983 – Cold War: While addressing a convention of Evangelicals, U.S. President Ronald Reagan labels the Soviet Union an "evil empire".
- 1985 – A supposed failed assassination attempt on Islamic cleric Sayyed Mohammad Hussein Fadlallah in Beirut, Lebanon kills 80 and injures 200 others.
- 1988 – Aeroflot Flight 3379 is hijacked by the Ovechkin family and diverted to Veshchevo in the Soviet Union.
- 1994 – A collision at Indira Gandhi International Airport kills 9 people.
- 2001 – Space Shuttle Discovery launches on STS-102, carrying the Expedition 2 crew to the International Space Station.
- 2004 – A new constitution is signed by Iraq's Governing Council.
- 2010 – Headlined by Hulk Hogan and Ric Flair, TNA Wrestling moves its flagship program, TNA Impact!, to Monday night. This effort to go "big time live" failed but is notable in the history of professional wrestling television.
- 2014 – In one of aviation's greatest mysteries, Malaysia Airlines Flight 370, carrying a total of 239 people, disappears en route from Kuala Lumpur to Beijing. The fate of the flight remains unknown.
- 2017 – The Azure Window, a natural arch on the Maltese island of Gozo, collapses in stormy weather.
- 2018 – The first Aurat March (social/political demonstration) is held on International Women's Day in Karachi, Pakistan, since then held annually across Pakistan, and the feminist slogan "Mera Jism Meri Marzi" (My body, my choice), in demand for women's right to bodily autonomy and against gender-based violence, came into vogue in Pakistan.
- 2021 – International Women's Day marches in Mexico become violent with 62 police officers and 19 civilians injured in Mexico City alone.
- 2021 – Twenty-eight political institutions in Myanmar establish the National Unity Consultative Council, a historic alliance of ethnic armed organizations and democratically elected leaders, in response to the 2021 Myanmar coup d'état.

== Births ==
=== Pre-1600 ===
- 1495 – John of God, Portuguese friar and saint (died 1550)

=== 1601–1900 ===
- 1712 – John Fothergill, English physician and botanist (died 1780)
- 1714 – Carl Philipp Emanuel Bach, German pianist and composer (died 1788)
- 1726 – Richard Howe, 1st Earl Howe, English admiral and politician, Treasurer of the Navy (died 1799)
- 1746 – André Michaux, French botanist and explorer (died 1802)
- 1748 – William V, Prince of Orange (died 1806)
- 1761 – Jan Potocki, Polish ethnologist, historian, linguist, and author (died 1815)
- 1799 – Simon Cameron, American journalist and politician, United States Secretary of War (died 1889)
- 1804 – Alvan Clark, American astronomer and telescope maker (died 1887)
- 1822 – Ignacy Łukasiewicz, Polish inventor and businessman, invented the Kerosene lamp (died 1882)
- 1827 – Wilhelm Bleek, German linguist and anthropologist (died 1875)
- 1830 – João de Deus, Portuguese poet and educator (died 1896)
- 1836 – Harriet Samuel, English businesswoman and founder the jewellery retailer H. Samuel (died 1908)
- 1841 – Oliver Wendell Holmes Jr., American lawyer and jurist (died 1935)
- 1851 – Frank Avery Hutchins, American librarian and educator (died 1914)
- 1856 – Bramwell Booth, English 2nd General of The Salvation Army (died 1929)
- 1856 – Colin Campbell Cooper, American painter and academic (died 1937)
- 1858 – Ida Hunt Udall, American diarist and homesteader (died 1915)
- 1859 – Kenneth Grahame, British author (died 1932)
- 1865 – Frederic Goudy, American type designer (died 1947)
- 1879 – Otto Hahn, German chemist and academic, Nobel Prize laureate (died 1968)
- 1886 – Edward Calvin Kendall, American chemist and academic, Nobel Prize laureate (died 1972)
- 1892 – Juana de Ibarbourou, Uruguayan poet and author (died 1979)
- 1896 – Charlotte Whitton, Canadian journalist and politician, 46th Mayor of Ottawa (died 1975)

=== 1901–present ===
- 1902 – Louise Beavers, American actress and singer (died 1962)
- 1902 – Jennings Randolph, American journalist and politician (died 1998)
- 1907 – Konstantinos Karamanlis, Greek lawyer and politician, President of Greece (died 1998)
- 1909 – Beatrice Shilling, English motorcycle racer and engineer (died 1990)
- 1910 – Claire Trevor, American actress (died 2000)
- 1911 – Alan Hovhaness, Armenian-American pianist and composer (died 2000)
- 1912 – Preston Smith, American businessman and politician, Governor of Texas (died 2003)
- 1912 – Meldrim Thomson Jr., American publisher and politician, Governor of New Hampshire (died 2001)
- 1914 – Yakov Borisovich Zel'dovich, Belarusian-Russian physicist and astronomer (died 1987)
- 1918 – Eileen Herlie, Scottish-American actress (died 2008)
- 1921 – Alan Hale Jr., American actor and restaurateur (died 1990)
- 1922 – Ralph H. Baer, German-American video game designer, created the Magnavox Odyssey (died 2014)
- 1922 – Cyd Charisse, American actress and dancer (died 2008)
- 1922 – Carl Furillo, American baseball player (died 1989)
- 1922 – Shigeru Mizuki, Japanese author and illustrator (died 2015)
- 1924 – Anthony Caro, English sculptor and illustrator (died 2013)
- 1924 – Sean McClory, Irish-American actor and director (died 2003)
- 1924 – Addie L. Wyatt, American civil rights activist and labor leader (died 2012)
- 1925 – Warren Bennis, American scholar, author, and academic (died 2014)
- 1926 – Francisco Rabal, Spanish actor, director, and screenwriter (died 2001)
- 1927 – Ramon Revilla Sr., Filipino actor and politician (died 2020)
- 1928 – Lore Segal, American novelist (died 2024)
- 1930 – Bob Grim, American baseball player (died 1996)
- 1930 – Douglas Hurd, English politician
- 1931 – Neil Adcock, South African cricketer (died 2013)
- 1931 – John McPhee, American author and educator
- 1931 – Neil Postman, American author and social critic (died 2003)
- 1931 – Gerald Potterton, English-Canadian animator, director, and producer (died 2022)
- 1934 – Marv Breeding, American baseball player and scout (died 2006)
- 1935 – George Coleman, American saxophonist, composer, and bandleader
- 1936 – Panditrao Agashe, Indian businessman (died 1986)
- 1936 – Sue Ane Langdon, American actress and singer
- 1937 – Richard Fariña, American singer-songwriter and author (died 1966)
- 1937 – Juvénal Habyarimana, Rwandan politician, President of Rwanda (died 1994)
- 1939 – Jim Bouton, American baseball player and journalist (died 2019)
- 1939 – Lynn Seymour, Canadian ballerina and choreographer (died 2023)
- 1939 – Lidiya Skoblikova, Russian speed skater and coach
- 1939 – Robert Tear, Welsh tenor and conductor (died 2011)
- 1941 – Norman Stone, British historian, author, and academic (died 2019)
- 1942 – Dick Allen, American baseball player and tenor (died 2020)
- 1942 – Ann Packer, English sprinter, hurdler, and long jumper
- 1943 – Susan Clark, Canadian actress and producer
- 1943 – Lynn Redgrave, English-American actress and singer (died 2010)
- 1944 – Carole Bayer Sager, American singer-songwriter
- 1944 – Sergey Nikitin, Russian singer-songwriter and guitarist
- 1945 – Micky Dolenz, American singer-songwriter and actor
- 1945 – Anselm Kiefer, German painter and sculptor
- 1946 – Randy Meisner, American singer-songwriter and bass player (died 2023)
- 1947 – Michael S. Hart, American author, founded Project Gutenberg (died 2011)
- 1948 – Mel Galley, English singer-songwriter and guitarist (died 2008)
- 1948 – Peggy March, American singer-songwriter
- 1948 – Jonathan Sacks, English rabbi, philosopher, and scholar (died 2020)
- 1949 – Teofilo Cubillas, Peruvian footballer
- 1951 – Phil Edmonds, Zambian-English cricketer
- 1951 – Dianne Walker, American tap dancer
- 1953 – Jim Rice, American baseball player, coach, and sportscaster
- 1954 – Steve James, American documentary filmmaker
- 1954 – David Wilkie, Sri Lankan-Scottish swimmer (died 2024)
- 1956 – Laurie Cunningham, English footballer (died 1989)
- 1956 – David Malpass, American economist and government official
- 1957 – Clive Burr, English rock drummer (died 2013)
- 1957 – Billy Childs, American pianist and composer
- 1958 – Gary Numan, English singer-songwriter, guitarist, and producer
- 1959 – Lester Holt, American journalist
- 1959 – Aidan Quinn, American actor
- 1960 – Irek Mukhamedov, Russian ballet dancer
- 1960 – Buck Williams, American basketball player and coach
- 1961 – Camryn Manheim, American actress
- 1961 – Larry Murphy, Canadian ice hockey player
- 1962 – Leon Robinson, American actor
- 1965 – Kenny Smith, American basketball player and sportscaster
- 1966 – Greg Barker, Baron Barker of Battle, English politician
- 1968 – Michael Bartels, German race car driver
- 1968 – Shawn Mullins, American singer-songwriter
- 1970 – Jason Elam, American football player
- 1970 – Andrea Parker, American actress
- 1972 – Matt Nable, Australian rugby league player and actor
- 1972 – Lena Sundström, Swedish journalist and author
- 1973 – Boris Kodjoe, Austrian-German actor
- 1976 – Chris Clark, American ice hockey player
- 1976 – Juan Encarnación, Dominican baseball player
- 1976 – Freddie Prinze Jr., American actor, producer, and screenwriter
- 1976 – Hines Ward, Korean-American football player
- 1977 – James Van Der Beek, American actor (died 2026)
- 1977 – Johann Vogel, Swiss footballer
- 1978 – Nick Zano, American actor
- 1979 – Tom Chaplin, English singer-songwriter and musician
- 1982 – Erik Ersberg, Swedish ice hockey player
- 1982 – Leonidas Kampantais, Greek footballer
- 1982 – Keemstar, American YouTuber
- 1982 – Kat Von D, American tattoo artist and model
- 1983 – André Santos, Brazilian footballer
- 1983 – Mark Worrell, American baseball player
- 1984 – Yoshihisa Hirano, Japanese baseball player
- 1984 – Ross Taylor, New Zealand cricketer
- 1984 – Sasha Vujačić, Slovenian basketball player
- 1985 – Maria Ohisalo, Finnish politician and researcher
- 1986 – Chad Gable, American wrestler
- 1986 – Thomas Morstead, American football player
- 1987 – Milana Vayntrub, Uzbekistani-American actress and comedian
- 1987 – Jonathan Wright, Australian rugby league player
- 1988 – Benny Blanco, American record producer
- 1988 – Tommy Pham, American baseball player
- 1989 – Robbie Hummel, American basketball player and sportscaster
- 1990 – Kristinia DeBarge, American singer-songwriter and actress
- 1990 – Asier Illarramendi, Spanish footballer
- 1990 – Brandon Kozun, American-Canadian ice hockey player
- 1990 – Petra Kvitová, Czech tennis player
- 1990 – Kevin Zeitler, American football player
- 1991 – Yoon Ji-sung, South Korean singer and actor
- 1993 – Rui Machida, Japanese basketball player
- 1994 – Claire Emslie, Scottish footballer
- 1995 – Marko Gudurić, Serbian basketball player
- 1995 – Isaiah Whitehead, American basketball player
- 1996 – Kyle Allen, American football player
- 1997 – Tijana Bošković, Serbian volleyball player
- 1999 – Nathan McSweeney, Australian cricketer
- 2003 – Montana Jordan, American actor
- 2004 – Kit Connor, English actor

== Deaths ==
=== Pre-1600 ===
- 1126 – Urraca of León and Castile (born 1079)
- 1137 – Adela of Normandy, by marriage countess of Blois (born c. 1067)
- 1144 – Pope Celestine II
- 1403 – Bayezid I, Ottoman sultan (born 1360)
- 1466 – Francesco I Sforza, Duke of Milan (born 1401)
- 1550 – John of God, Portuguese friar and saint (born 1495)

=== 1601–1900 ===
- 1619 – Veit Bach, German baker and miller
- 1641 – Xu Xiake, Chinese geographer and explorer (born 1587)
- 1702 – William III of England (born 1650)
- 1717 – Abraham Darby I, English blacksmith (born 1678)
- 1723 – Povel Juel, Norwegian civil servant (born c.1673)
- 1723 – Christopher Wren, English architect, designed St. Paul's Cathedral (born 1632)
- 1844 – Charles XIV John of Sweden (born 1763)
- 1869 – Hector Berlioz, French composer, conductor, and critic (born 1803)
- 1872 – Priscilla Susan Bury, British botanist (born 1799)
- 1872 – Cornelius Krieghoff, Dutch-Canadian painter (born 1815)
- 1874 – Millard Fillmore, American lawyer and politician, 13th President of the United States (born 1800)
- 1887 – Henry Ward Beecher, American minister and activist (born 1813)
- 1887 – James Buchanan Eads, American engineer, designed the Eads Bridge (born 1820)
- 1889 – John Ericsson, Swedish-American engineer (born 1803)

=== 1901–present ===
- 1917 – Ferdinand von Zeppelin, German general and businessman (born 1838)
- 1923 – Johannes Diderik van der Waals, Dutch physicist and academic, Nobel Prize laureate (born 1837)
- 1930 – William Howard Taft, American politician, 27th President of the United States (born 1857)
- 1930 – Edward Terry Sanford, American jurist and politician, United States Assistant Attorney General (born 1865)
- 1932 – Minna Craucher, Finnish socialite and spy (born 1891)
- 1937 – Howie Morenz, Canadian ice hockey player (born 1902)
- 1941 – Sherwood Anderson, American novelist and short story writer (born 1876)
- 1942 – José Raúl Capablanca, Cuban chess player (born 1888)
- 1943 – Cipto Mangunkusumo, Indonesian independence leader (born 1886)
- 1944 – Fredy Hirsch, German Jewish athlete who helped thousands of Jewish children in the Holocaust (born 1916)
- 1948 – Hulusi Behçet, Turkish dermatologist and scientist (born 1889)
- 1957 – Othmar Schoeck, Swiss composer and conductor (born 1886)
- 1961 – Thomas Beecham, English conductor and composer (born 1879)
- 1971 – Harold Lloyd, American actor, director, and producer (born 1893)
- 1973 – Ron "Pigpen" McKernan, American keyboard player and songwriter (born 1945)
- 1975 – George Stevens, American director, producer, and screenwriter (born 1904)
- 1982 – Hatem Ali Jamadar, Bengali politician (born 1872)
- 1983 – Alan Lennox-Boyd, 1st Viscount Boyd of Merton, English lieutenant and politician (born 1904)
- 1983 – William Walton, English composer (born 1902)
- 1993 – Billy Eckstine, American jazz singer (born 1914)
- 1996 – Jack Churchill, British colonel (born 1906)
- 1998 – Ray Nitschke, American football player (born 1936)
- 1999 – Adolfo Bioy Casares, Argentinian journalist and author (born 1914)
- 1999 – Peggy Cass, American actress and comedian (born 1924)
- 1999 – Joe DiMaggio, American baseball player and coach (born 1914)
- 2003 – Adam Faith, English singer (born 1940)
- 2003 – Karen Morley, American actress (born 1909)
- 2004 – Muhammad Zaidan, Syrian militant, founded the Palestinian Liberation Front (born 1948)
- 2005 – César Lattes, Brazilian physicist and academic (born 1924)
- 2005 – Aslan Maskhadov, Chechen commander and politician, President of the Chechen Republic of Ichkeria (born 1951)
- 2007 – John Inman, English actor (born 1935)
- 2007 – John Vukovich, American baseball player and coach (born 1947)
- 2009 – Hank Locklin, American singer-songwriter and guitarist (born 1918)
- 2012 – Simin Daneshvar, Iranian author and academic (born 1921)
- 2013 – John O'Connell, Irish politician, Irish Minister of Health (born 1927)
- 2013 – Ewald-Heinrich von Kleist-Schmenzin, German soldier and publisher (born 1922)
- 2014 – Leo Bretholz, Austrian-American Holocaust survivor and author (born 1921)
- 2014 – William Guarnere, American sergeant (born 1923)
- 2015 – Sam Simon, American director, producer, and screenwriter (born 1955)
- 2016 – George Martin, English composer, conductor, and producer (born 1926)
- 2018 – Kate Wilhelm, American author (born 1928)
- 2019 – Marshall Brodien, American actor (born 1934)
- 2019 – Cedrick Hardman, American football player and actor (born 1948)
- 2020 – Max von Sydow, Swedish actor (born 1929)
- 2025 – Athol Fugard, South African actor, director, and playwright (born 1932)

== Holidays and observances ==
- Christian feast day:
  - Edward King (Church of England)
  - Felix of Burgundy
  - John of God
  - Philemon the actor
  - March 8 (Eastern Orthodox liturgics)
- International Women's Day, and its related observances:
  - International Women's Collaboration Brew Day
