= List of railway lines in Turkey =

Railway line in Turkey

This is a list of railway lines made within the borders of present-day Turkey since 1860.

== Railway lines ==
Line	Linear (km)	Opening Date	Company	Note
Ottoman Empire period
İzmir - Sütlaç	357	1860	Ottoman Railway Company	İzmir–Eğirdir railway
İzmir Basmane – Manisa – Turgutlu	93	1865	French company	
İstanbul Sirkeci - Hadımköy	51	1872	Chemins de fer Orientaux	
İstanbul Haydarpaşa – Pendik	26	1872	Ottoman Railway Company	
Hadımköy – Sınır	229	1873	Chemins de fer Orientaux	
Karaağaç – Sınır	7	1873	Chemins de fer Orientaux	
Pendik – İzmit	67	1873	Ottoman Railway Company	
Turgutlu – Alaşehir	76	1875	French company	
Mersin – Yenice	43	1882	British company	
Torbalı – Tire	48	1883	British company	
Yenice – Adana	24	1886	British company	
Alaşehir – Uşak	118	1887	British company	
Çatal – Ödemiş	26	1888	British company	
Goncalı – Denizli	9	1889	British company	
Sütlaç – Çivril	30	1889	British company	
Dinar – Eğirdir	94	1889 sonrası	British company	
Alaşehir – Afyon	135	1890	French company	
Manisa – Kırkağaç	81	1890	French company	
Ortaklar – Söke	22	1890	British company	
İzmit – Büyükderbent	18	1890	Anatolian Railway Company	
Büyükderbent – Vezirhan	105	1891	Anatolian Railway Company	
Vezirhan – Ankara	362	1892	Anatolian Railway Company	
Mudanya – Bursa	42	1893		
Tiflis – Kars	124		Russian company	Parts left over on Turkish soil
Eskişehir – Kütahya	77	1894	Anatolian Railway Company	
Alayunt – Akşehir	192	1895	Anatolian Railway Company	
Akşehir – Konya	174	1896	Anatolian Railway Company	
Arifiye – Adapazarı	8,5	1899	Anatolian Railway Company	
Konya – Bulgurlu	199	1904	Baghdad Railway	
Bulgurlu – Ulukışla	39	1911	Baghdad Railway	
Sütlaç – Eğirdir	114	1912	British company	
Ulukışla – Yenice	108	1912	Baghdad Railway	
Adana – Toprakkale – Mamure	97	1912	Baghdad Railway	
(Aleppo) – Al-Rai – Karkamış, önceki: Jarabulus	188	1912	Baghdad Railway	
Fevzipaşa – Meydan Ekbez – (Aleppo)	35	1912	Baghdad Railway	
Toprakkale – İskenderun	59	1912	Baghdad Railway	
Kırkağaç – Bandırma	195	1912	French company	
Mandıra – Kırklareli	46	1912	Chemins de fer Orientaux	
Toprakkale – İskenderun	60	1913	Baghdad Railway	
Jarabulus – Akçakale, önceki: Tel Abyad	101	1914	Baghdad Railway	
Akçakale – Sayalı, önceki: Tuem	62	1915	Baghdad Railway	
Sayalı – Ceylanpınar, önceki: Resulayn	41	1915	Baghdad Railway	
Kars – Erzurum		Before 1917	Russian military ground	Narrow gauge railway
Resulayn – Şenyurt, önceki: Derbesiye	61	1917	Baghdad Railway	
Mamure – Meydan Ekbez	54	1917	Baghdad Railway	Amanos Mountains
Hudut – Çobanköy – Nusaybin	382	1917	Baghdad Railway	
Derbesiye – Mardin	24	1917	Baghdad Railway	
Karapınar – Durak	37	1918	Baghdad Railway	Taurus Mountains
Alaşehir – Afyon		Before 1918	French company	
Soma – Bandırma	185	Before 1918	French company	
Period of the Republic of Turkey
Ankara – Yerköy	203	1925	TCDD	First line built by TCDD
Samsun – Kavak	48	1926	TCDD	
Yerköy – Kayseri	176	1927	TCDD	
Kavak – Kayabaşı	98	1927	TCDD	
Kayabaşı – Zile	69	1928	TCDD	
Kütahya – Emirler	64	1929	TCDD	
Fevzipaşa – Gölbaşı	138	1929	TCDD	
Kayseri – İhsanlı	111	1930	TCDD	
Emirler – Balıköy	36	1930	TCDD	
Zile – Kunduz	70	1930	TCDD	
İhsanlı – Sivas	112	1930	TCDD	
Gölbaşı – Doğanşehir	56	1930	TCDD	
Doğanşehir – Malatya	57	1931	TCDD	
Malatya – Fırat	33	1932	TCDD	
Balıköy – Balıkesir	153	1932	TCDD	
Kunduz – Kalın	93	1932	TCDD	
Kardeşgediği – Bor	45	1932	TCDD	
Bor – Boğazköprü	126	1933	TCDD	
Fırat – Yolçatı – Elâzığ	86	1934	TCDD	
Çandır – Atkaracalar	86	1934	TCDD	
Yolçatı – Maden	76	1935	TCDD	
Narlı – Gaziantep	84	1935	TCDD	
Atkaracalar – Ortaköy	56	1935	TCDD	
Maden – Diyarbakır	83	1935	TCDD	
Sivas – Eskiköy	63	1935	TCDD	
Kayseri – Ulukışla		1935	TCDD	
Adana – Şehir	3	1936	TCDD	
Ortaköy – Bolkuş	60	1936	TCDD	
Malatya – Yazıhan	33	1936	TCDD	
Bolkuş – Hisarönü	86	1936	TCDD	
Eskiköy – Çetinkaya	48	1936	TCDD	
Yazıhan – Hekimhan	37	1936	TCDD	
Hisarönü – Çatalağzı	15	1936	TCDD	
Bozanönü – Isparta	13	1936	TCDD	
Gümüşgün – Burdur	24	1936	TCDD	
Afyon – Karakuyu	112	1936	TCDD	
Çetinkaya – Divriği	65	1937	TCDD	
Hekimhan – Çetinkaya	70	1937	TCDD	
Çatalağzı – Zonguldak	10	1937	TCDD	
Divriği – Erzincan	156	1938	TCDD	
Erzincan – Erzurum	215	1939	TCDD	
Diyarbakır – Bismil	47	1940	TCDD	
Hadımköy – Kurukavak	11	1941	TCDD	
Bismil – Sinan	28	1942	TCDD	
Sinan – Batman	15	1943	TCDD	
Batman – Kurtalan	69	1944	TCDD	
Tavşanlı – Tunçbilek	13	1944	TCDD	
Malatya – Malatya Şehir	3	1944	TCDD	
Zonguldak – Kozlu	4	1945	TCDD	
Elâzığ – Palu	70	1946	TCDD	
Palu – Genç	63	1947	TCDD	
Köprüağzı – Maraş	28	1948	TCDD	
Erzurum – Horasan	85	1949	TCDD	
Uzunahmetler – Yekabat	33	1949	TCDD	
Horasan – Sarıkamış	72	1951	TCDD	
Yekabat – USSR border	229	1951	TCDD	
Kozlu – Ereğli – Armutçuk	16	1953	TCDD	
Genç – Muş	108	1955	TCDD	
Yenidoğan – Temelli	1	1957	TCDD	
Çardakbaşı – Beylikahır	3	1957	TCDD	
Esenkent – Sincan	11	1957 - 1965	TCDD	
Beylikahır – Yalınlı	5	1957	TCDD	
Gaziantep – Karkamış	91	1960	TCDD	
Sarıkamış – Kars	60	1961	TCDD	
Etimesgut – Behiçbey	6	1961	TCDD	
Kars – Kayaköprü (USSR border)	64	1962	TCDD	
Kütahya – Seyitömer	27	1962	TCDD	
Muş – Tatvan	94	1964	TCDD	
İğciler – Polatlı	1	1965	TCDD	
Gazi – Ankara	0,5	1965	TCDD	
Esenkent – Malıköy	1	1966	TCDD	Varyant
Karapınar – Yenidoğan	12	1968	TCDD	Varyant
Sapanca – Arifiye	6	1970	TCDD	Varyant
Pehlivanköy – Edirne – Kapıkule	68	1971	TCDD	
Van – Kapıköy (Iran border)	117	1971	TCDD	Tatvan – Van
Tahtaköprü	21	1972	TCDD	Varyant
Halkalı – Ispartakule	9	1972	TCDD	
Sazak – Biçer	14	1972	TCDD	Varyant
Keban	47	1973	TCDD	Varyant
Sazılar – Biçer	13	1973	TCDD	Varyant
Ispartakule – Ömer	8	1973	TCDD	Varyant
Yalınlı – Yunusemre	12	1974	TCDD	Varyant
Yunusemre – Sazak	3	1974	TCDD	Varyant
İlören – Sazılar Kurp Tashihi	1	1974	TCDD	Varyant
Biçer – İlören	9	1974	TCDD	Varyant
Kapıköy – Razi (Iran border)		1975	TCDD	
Ömerli – Çatalca	16	1980	TCDD	Varyant
Sinekli – Çerkezköy	10	1980	TCDD	Varyant
Samsun – Çarşamba	39	1980	TCDD	
Keban	10	1982	TCDD	
Samsun – Gelemen	13	1983	TCDD	
Bozüyük – İnönü	5	1985	TCDD	
Kardeşgediği – Ulukışla	3	1985	TCDD	
Yazıhan – Dilek	8	1986	TCDD	
Eskimalatya – Bekir Hüseyin	25	1986	TCDD	
Meydan – Bozdağ	5	1985	TCDD	
Hanlı – Bostankaya	44	1994	TCDD	
Menemen – Aliağa	26	1995	TCDD	
Eskişehir – İnönü	31	1996	TCDD	
Esenkent – Eskişehir	206	2009	TCDD	High-speed railway line
Sincan– Esenkent	15	2010	TCDD	High-speed railway line
Tekirdağ – Muratlı	31	2010	TCDD	
Polatlı – Konya	212	2011	TCDD	High-speed railway line
Eskişehir – Köseköy	188	2014	TCDD	High-speed railway line. Some parts that are still under construction (~30km in total), are by-passed through renewed conventional lines.
Osmaneli – Bursa		Under construction	TCDD	
Kayaş – Sivas	394	Under construction	TCDD	High-speed railway line
Polatlı – Afyon		Under construction	TCDD	High-speed railway line
Afyon – Menemen		Under construction	TCDD	High-speed railway line
