= Porsuk Inscription =

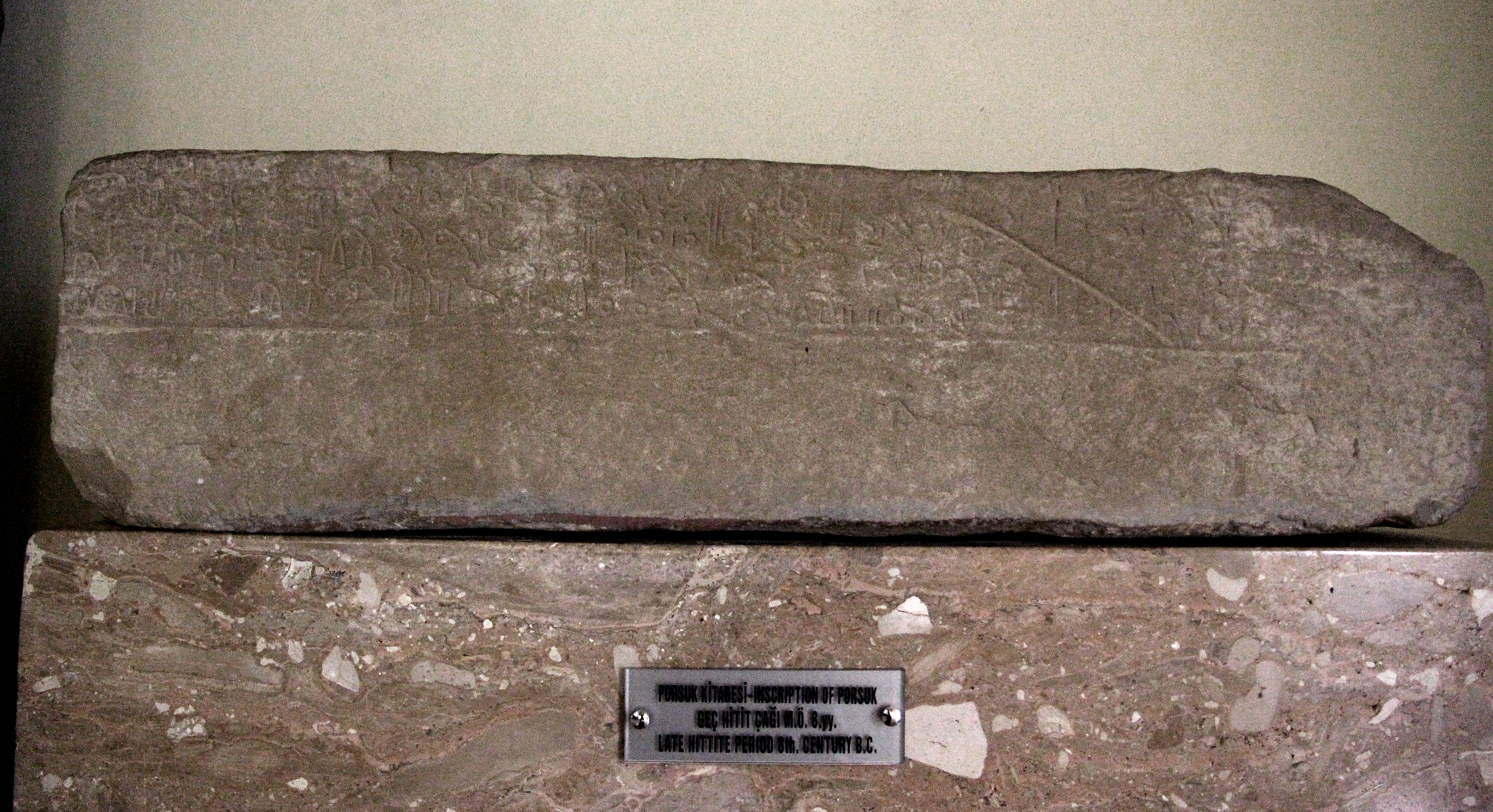
Porsuk inscription

The Porsuk Inscription from Porsuk in south Turkey dates from Neo-Hittite times around the beginning of the first millennium BC and is engraved on a rectangular stone block. It has been tentatively dated to the 8th century BC, the era of the Luwian kingdom of Tuwanuwa.

The inscription is dedicated by the military commander Parahwaras. He mentions his father Atis, his grandfather Nunas, and the king Masaurhisas which he apparently served. The people mentioned in the text are not otherwise known. Parahwaras' patron god was Šarruma. Daniel Schwemer considered this god to have an Anatolian name. Both Dennis Pardee and Gary Beckman classified the god's name as Hurrian.

== Discovery ==
The stone was discovered before 1960 on the hill of Zeyve Höyük, a pre-historic hill-settlement near the town of Porsuk, about 8 km east of Ulukışla in the Turkish Province of Niğde. According to the Niğde Archaeological Museum's admission record, it was found "between the railway and asphalt street on the new road towards a nitrate factory" and brought to the museum by the Muhtar of the town, Hasan Altan. Its inventory number in the museum is 52.

== Description ==
According to John David Hawkins, the stone block is made of white limestone, while Dietrich Berges and Johannes Nollé say it is light brown tufa. It measures 129 cm wide, 31 cm high and 35 cm deep. On the upper side there are holes at left and right, which were used at that time for metal clips for securing masonry. Therefore, it is likely that the stone was part of a wall. On the upper edge of the front face is a one-line inscription in Luwian hieroglyphs, which is 14 cm high and runs from right to left. On the left edge under the inscription is another single-line right-to-left inscription. The inscription probably continued on other stones and then returned in a boustrophedon style which is not unusual in Luwian inscriptions. In that case, the isolated signs (zi+ra/i), which according to Hawkins might be a verb-ending, would be the end of the text.

The inscription reads:

I am Parahwaras, son of Atis, grandson
of Nunas.
My god Šarruma was well-disposed to me (?).
And the kings were well-disposed to me (?).
And King Masaurhisas was well-disposed to me (?).
And I was the commander of the army.

The people mentioned in the text are not otherwise known, so a date can only be assigned on stylistic grounds in the time of the Late Hittite principalities. The find location was part of the Luwian kingdom of Tuwanuwa at this time.

== Gallery ==
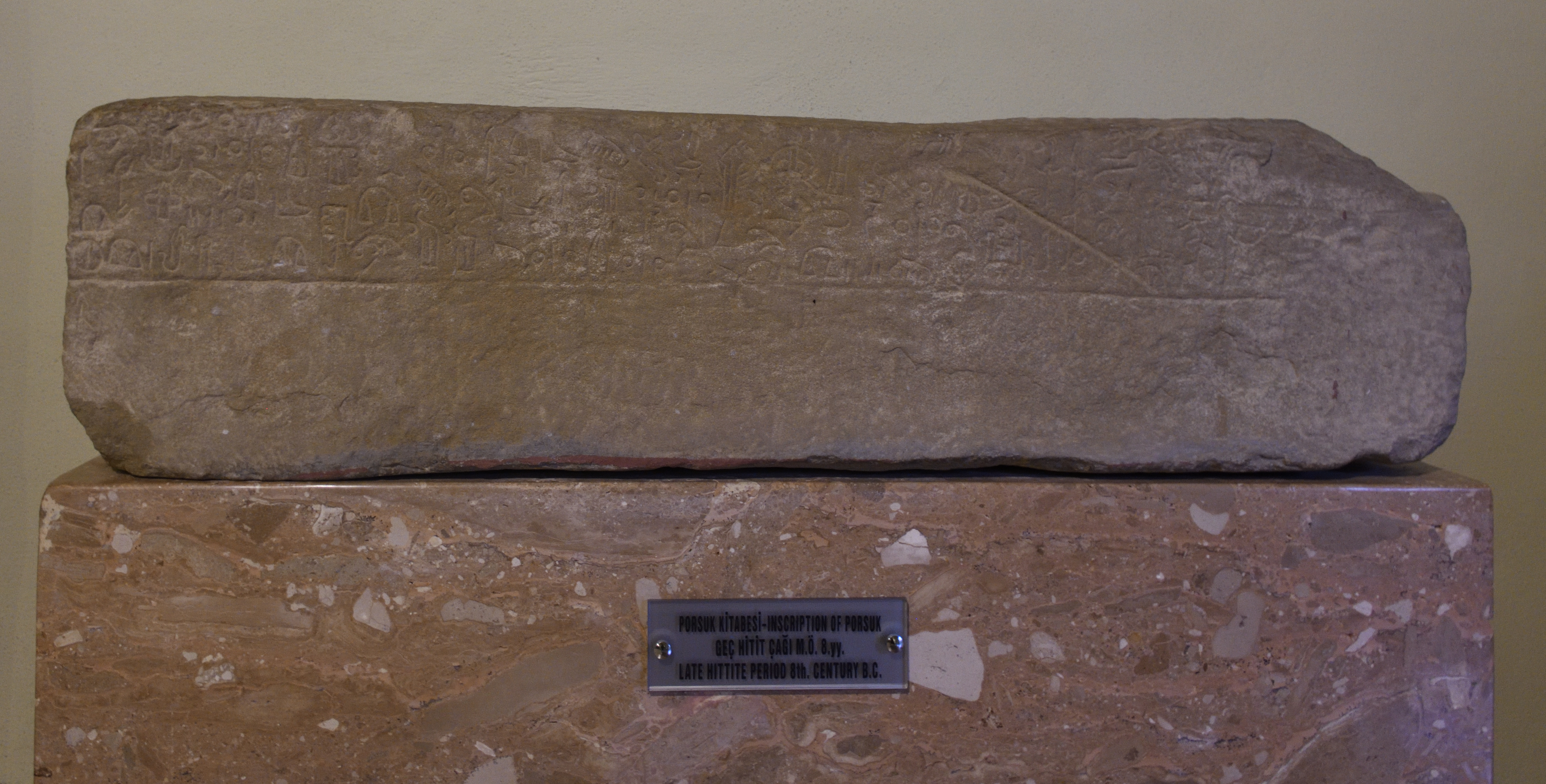
Nigde museum Porsuk inscription Late Hittite 8th BC original colour

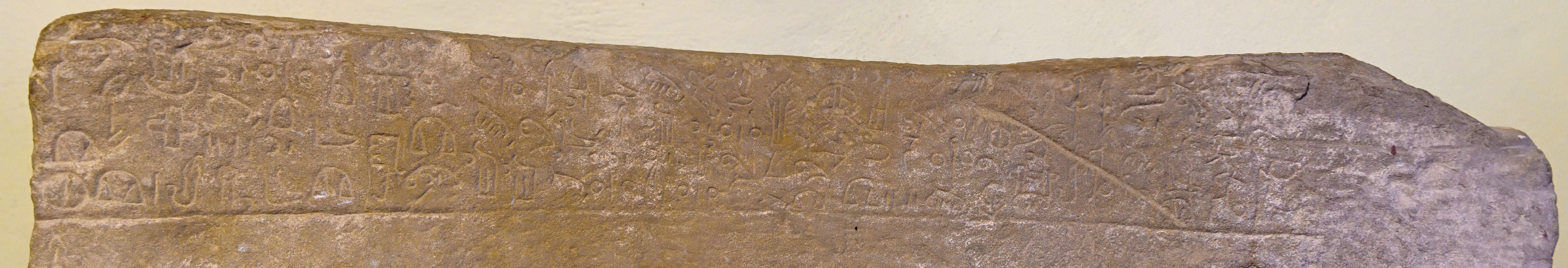
Nigde museum Porsuk inscription Late Hittite 8th BC panorama

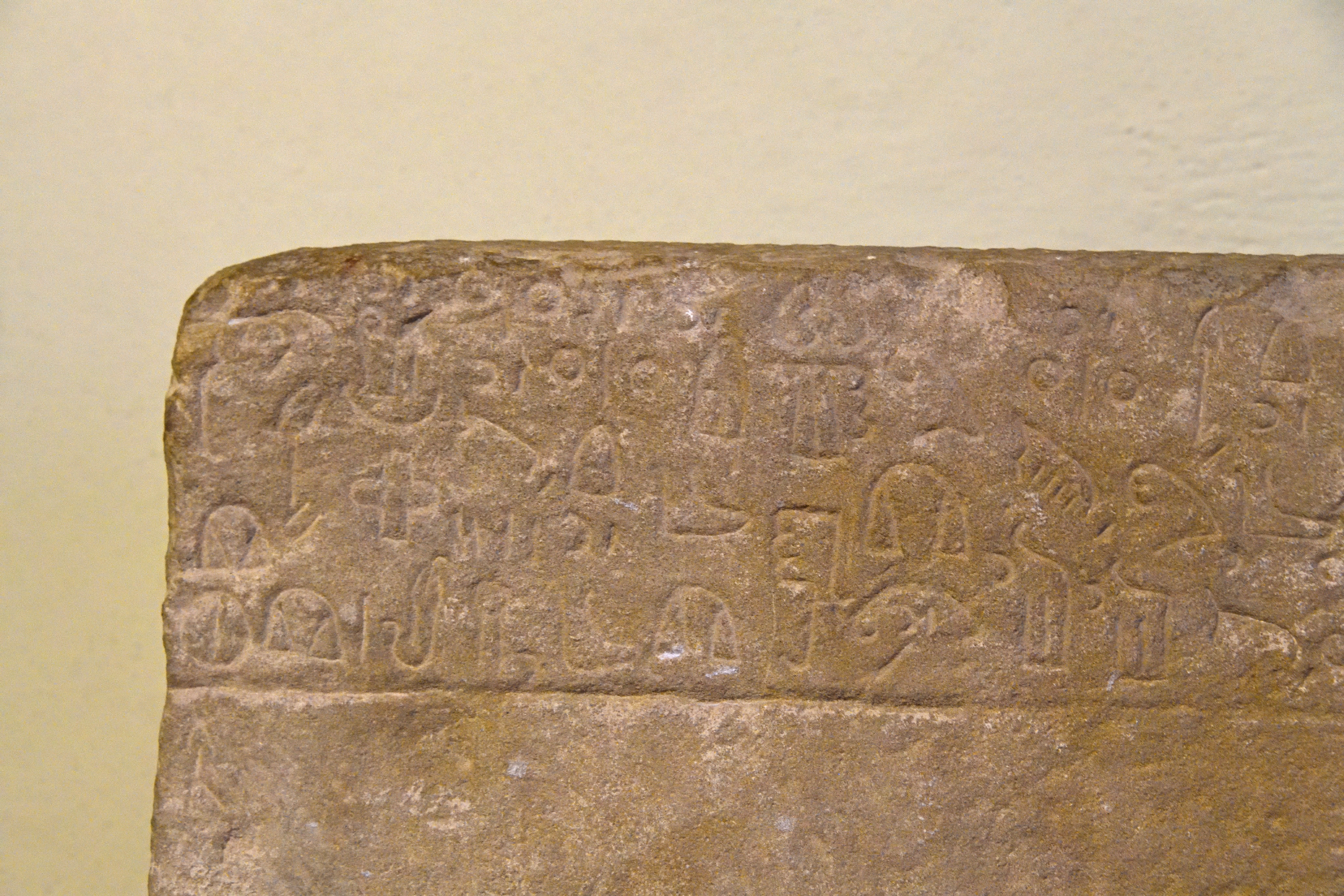
Nigde museum Porsuk inscription Late Hittite 8th BC Detail 1

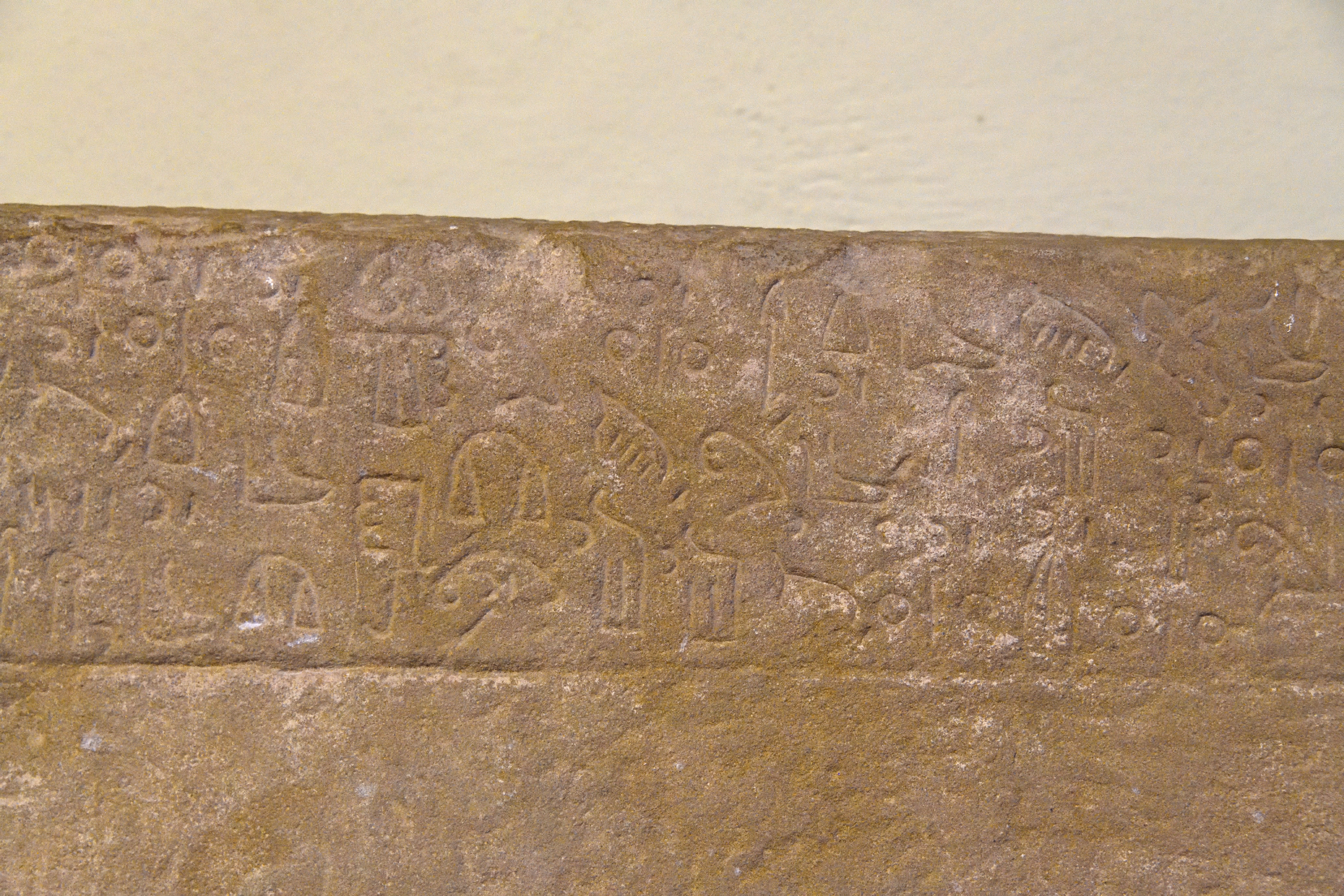
Nigde museum Porsuk inscription Late Hittite 8th BC Detail 2

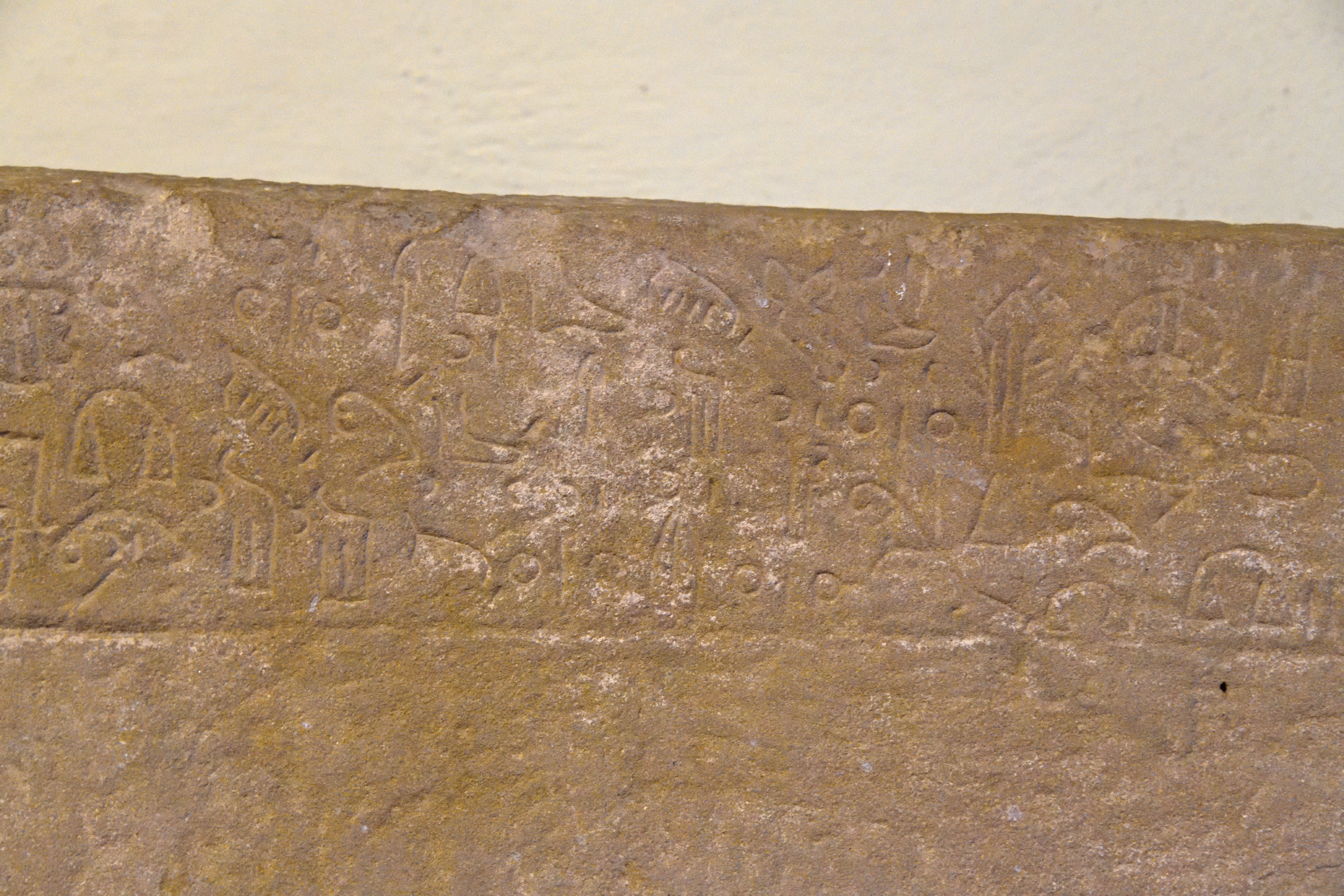
Nigde museum Porsuk inscription Late Hittite 8th BC Detail 3

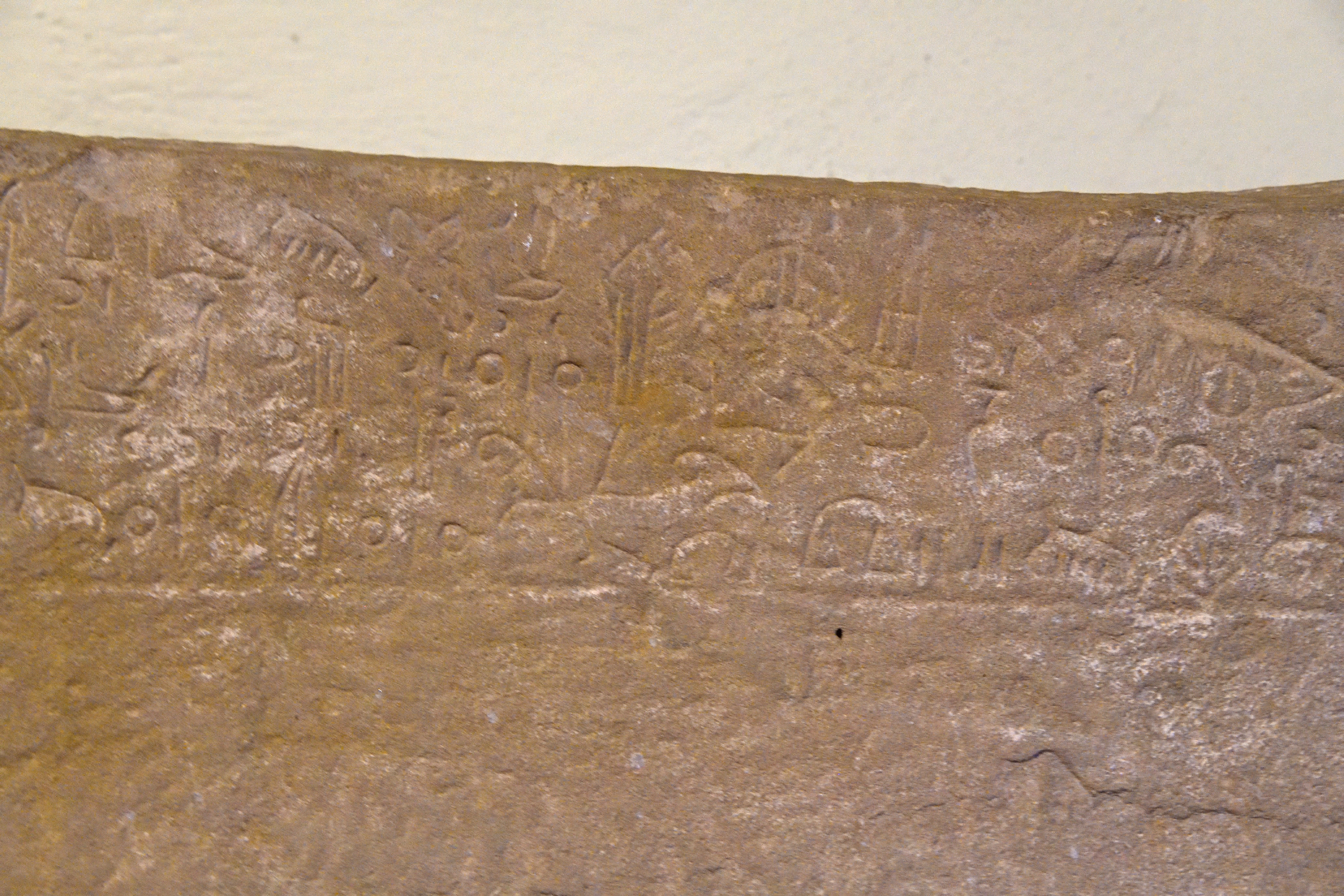
Nigde museum Porsuk inscription Late Hittite 8th BC Detail 4

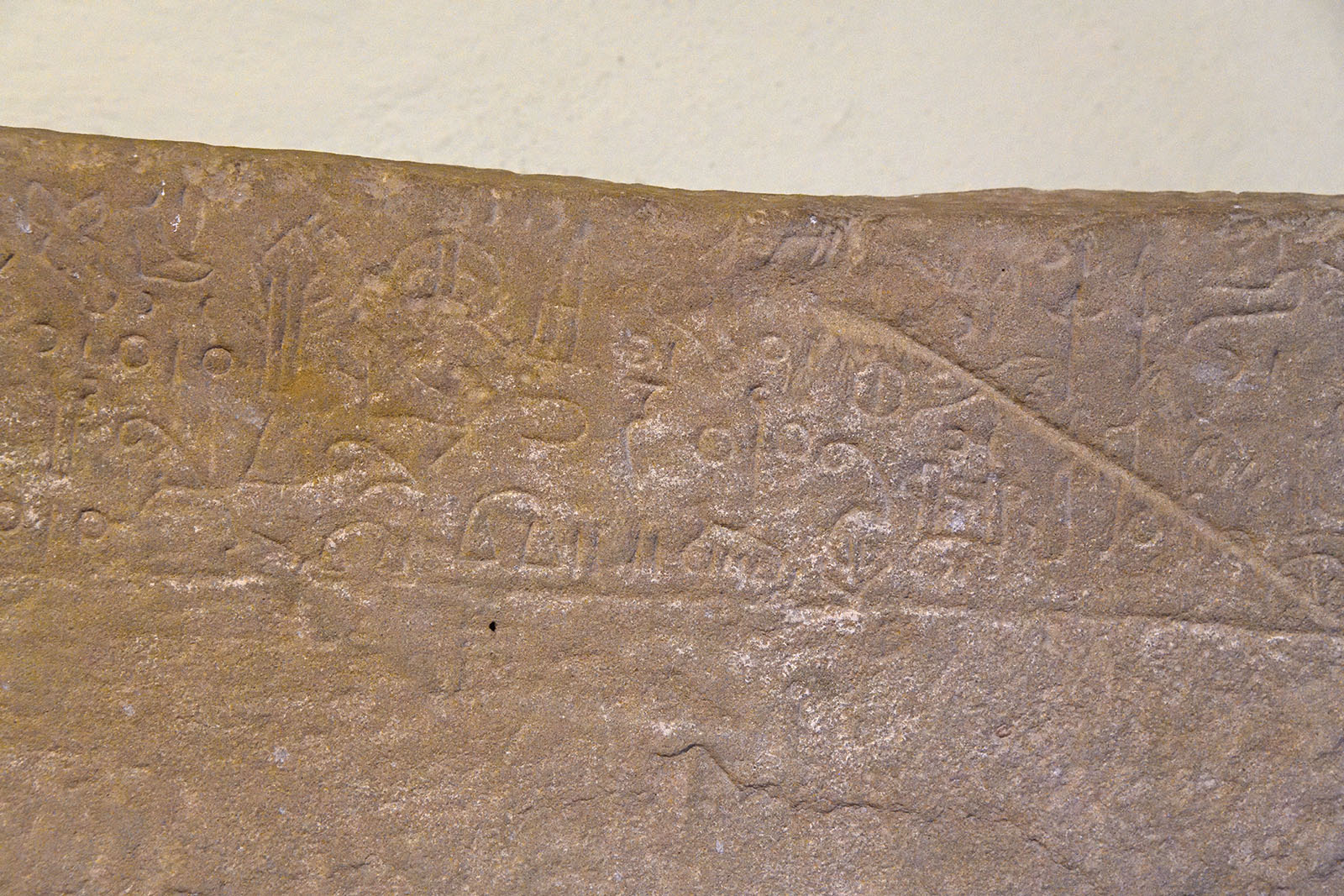
Nigde museum Porsuk inscription Late Hittite 8th BC Detail 5

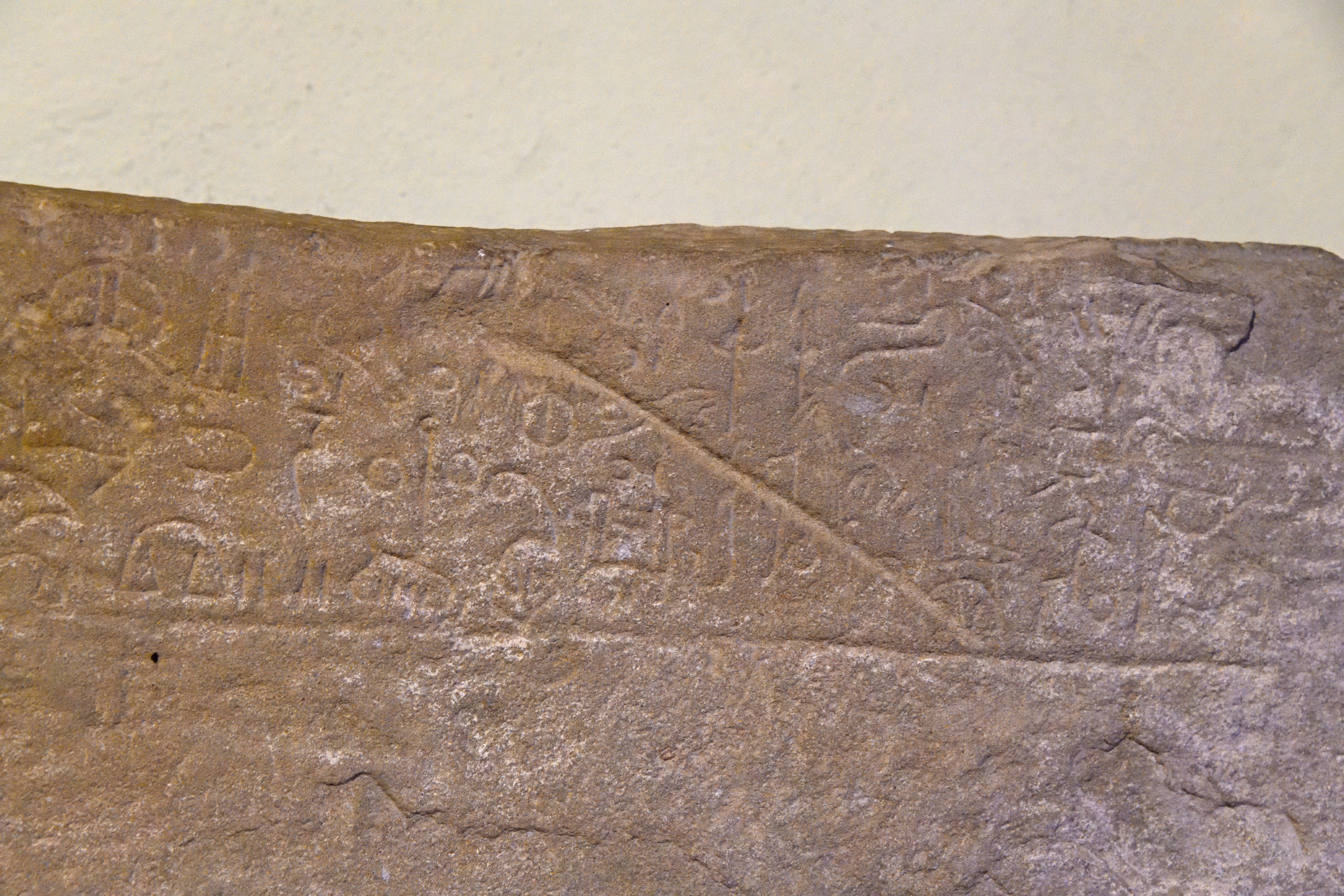
Nigde museum Porsuk inscription Late Hittite 8th BC Detail 6

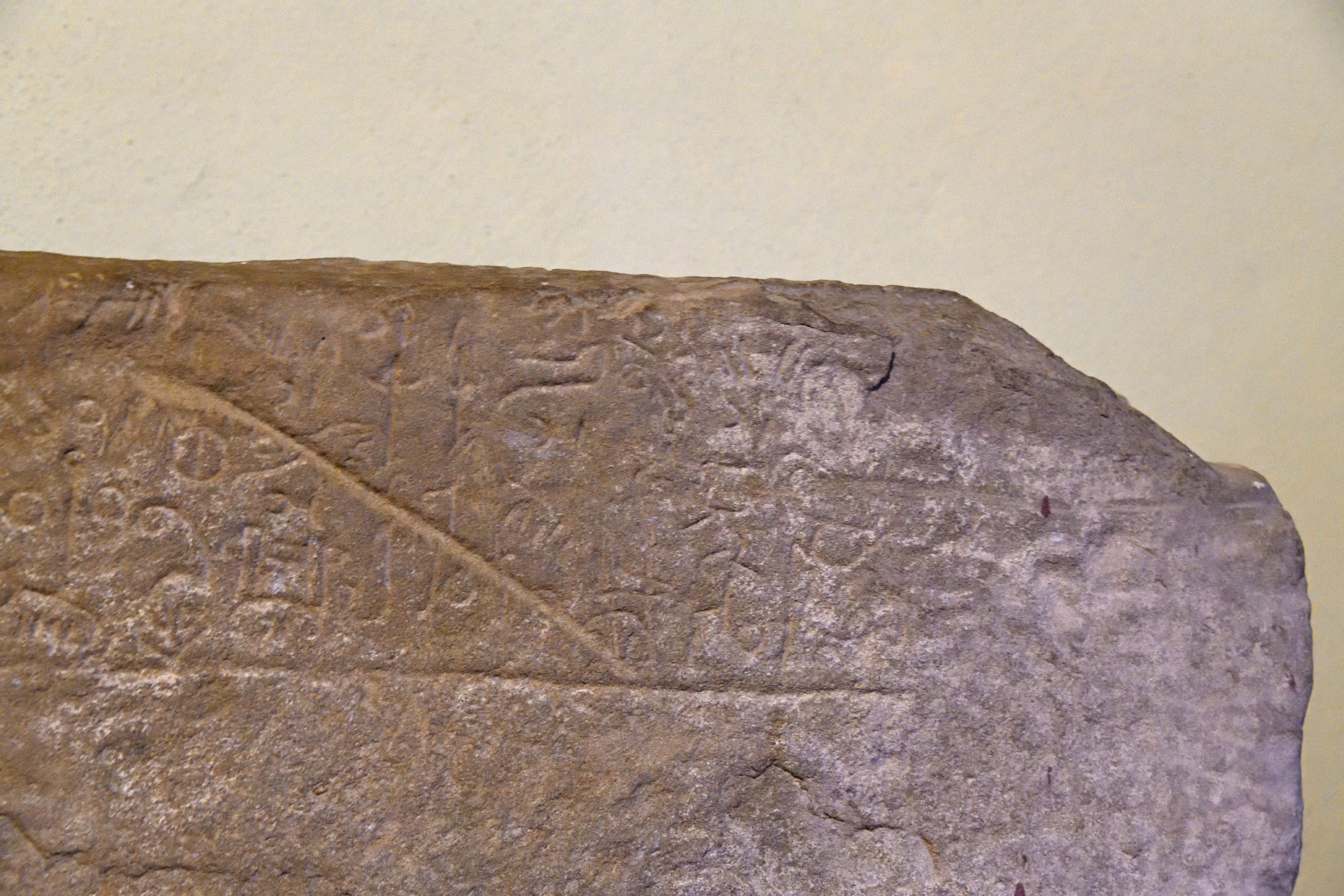
Nigde museum Porsuk inscription Late Hittite 8th BC Detail 7

== Bibliography ==
- John David Hawkins: "A Hieroglyphic Hittite Inscription from Porsuk." In: Anatolian Studies 19, 1969, pp. 99–109
- Dietrich Berges, Johannes Nollé: Tyana - Archäologisch-historische Untersuchungen zum südwestlichen Kappadokien. Habelt, Bonn 2000, ISBN 3-7749-2959-9 p. 105.
- John David Hawkins: Corpus of Hieroglyphic Luwian Inscriptions. Vol. I: Inscriptions of the Iron Age. Part 2: Text. Amuq, Aleppo, Hama, Tabal, Assur Letters, Miscellaneous, Seals, Indices. (= Studies in Indo-European Language and Culture 8). de Gruyter, Berlin. 2000, ISBN 3-11-010864-X. pp. 527–528 No. X.48 Tbl. 302.
- Beckman, Gary (2002). "The Pantheon of Emar". Silva Anatolica: Anatolian studies presented to Maciej Popko on the occasion of his 65th birthday. Warsaw: Agade. hdl:2027.42/77414. ISBN 83-87111-12-0. OCLC 51004996.
- Pardee, Dennis (1990). "Ugaritic Proper Nouns". Archiv für Orientforschung. 36/37. Archiv für Orientforschung (AfO)/Institut für Orientalistik: 390–513. ISSN 0066-6440. JSTOR 41661762.
- Schwemer, Daniel (2001). Die Wettergottgestalten Mesopotamiens und Nordsyriens im Zeitalter der Keilschriftkulturen: Materialien und Studien nach den schriftlichen Quellen (in German). Wiesbaden: Harrassowitz. ISBN 978-3-447-04456-1. OCLC 48145544.
