= Hasangazi =

- Village
- Location within Turkey Location within Turkey Central Anatolia
- Coordinates: 37°33′N 34°38′E
- Country: Turkey
- Province: Niğde
- District: Ulukışla
- Elevation: 1,385 m (4,544 ft)
- Population (2022): 828
- Time zone: UTC+3 (TRT)
- Postal code: 51900
- Area code: 0388

Hasangazi (formerly Lu'lu'a, Lulu, or Lüle) is a village of the Ulukışla District, Niğde Province in the Central Anatolia region of Turkey. Its population is 828 (2022). It is located 16 km east of Ulukışla and 70 km south of Niğde.

The town is rumored to be named after a war veteran of the Turkish War of Independence but its name was stated as Esengazi in old Ottoman documents a few centuries before the war. In recent years, the town has experienced a seasonal population increase as residents of Mersin and Adana have fled the heat of the cities. The village is served by the Turkish State Railways station Gümüş.

== History ==
The village lies near the Byzantine fortress of Loulon, known in Arabic as Lu'lu'a.

Between 1216 and 1218, Kaykaus I captured the town from the Armenians. The Seljuqs strengthened its fortifications and made it an important way station on the road between Sis and Kayseri. Owing to rich silver deposits nearby, the town became an important mint in the second half of the 13th century. Both the Seljuqs of Rûm and the Ilkhanids minted silver coins in the town under the mint name Lu'lu'a (Arabic: لولوة). The extant medieval fortress is known as Lüle Kalesi.
