= Yeniyıldız =

- Village
- Location in Turkey Yeniyıldız (Turkey Central Anatolia)
- Coordinates: 37°28′N 34°23′E
- Country: Turkey
- Province: Niğde
- District: Ulukışla
- Elevation: 1,540 m (5,050 ft)
- Population (2022): 660
- Time zone: UTC+3 (TRT)
- Postal code: 51900
- Area code: 0388

Yeniyıldız is a village in Ulukışla District of Niğde Province. Its population is 660 (2022). Before the 2013 reorganisation, it was a town (belde). Distance to Ulukışla is 24 kilometres (15 mi) and to Niğde is 82 kilometres (51 mi). It is a high-altitude town situated in Toros Mountains.
