= Toraman, Ulukışla =

Toraman
- Village
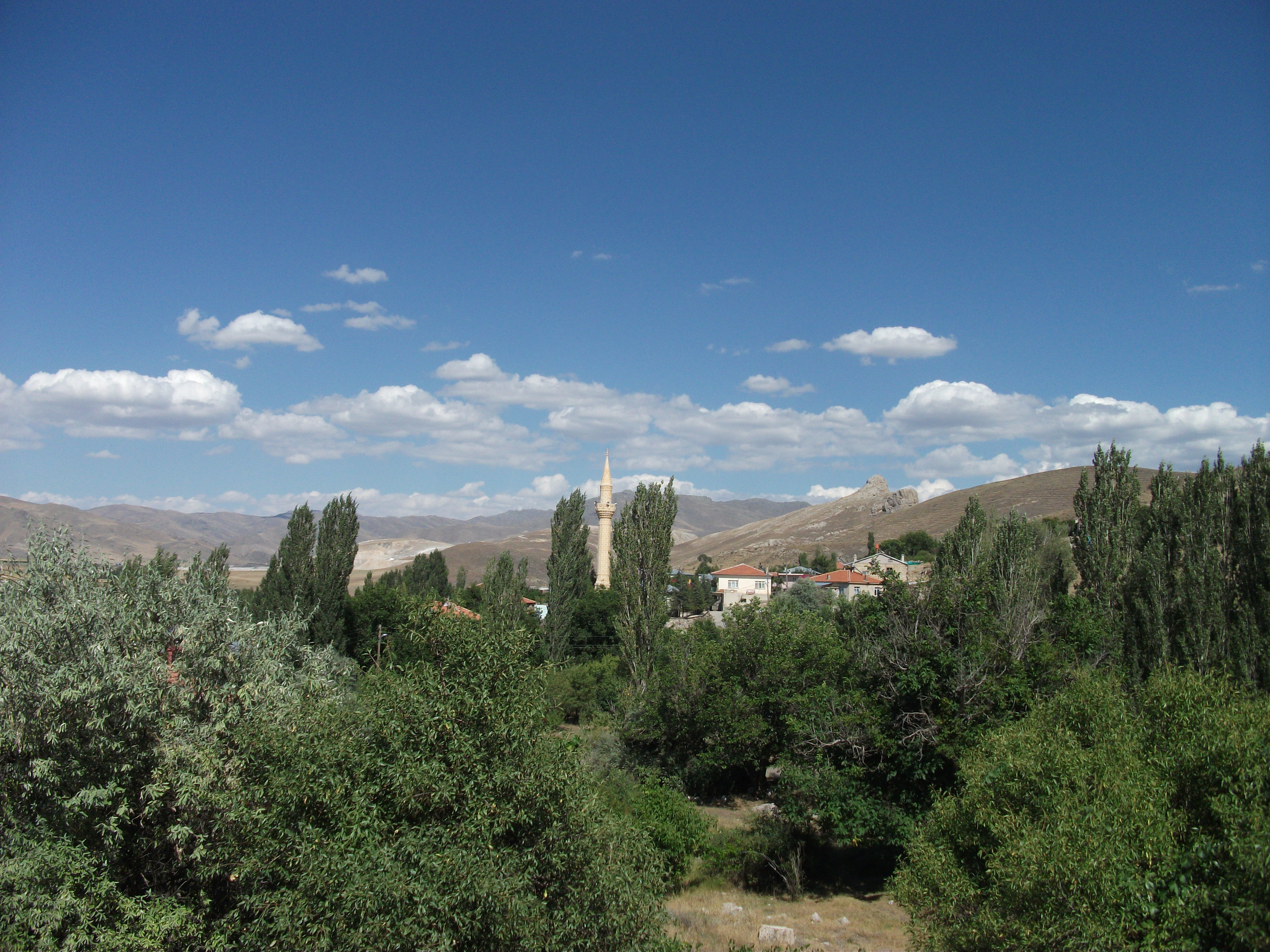
- Toraman village

- Location within Turkey Location within Turkey Central Anatolia
- Coordinates: 37°38′24″N 34°41′3″E
- Country: Turkey
- Province: Niğde
- District: Ulukışla
- Population (2022): 104
- Time zone: UTC+3 (TRT)

Toraman is a village in Ulukışla District of Niğde Province, Turkey. Its population is 104 (2022).
