= Alihoca =

- Village
- Location within Turkey Location within Turkey Central Anatolia
- Coordinates: 37°30′N 34°43′E
- Country: Turkey
- Province: Niğde
- District: Ulukışla
- Elevation: 1,160 m (3,810 ft)
- Population (2022): 428
- Time zone: UTC+3 (TRT)
- Postal code: 51900
- Area code: 0388

Alihoca is a village in Ulukışla District of Niğde Province, Turkey. Its population is 428 (2022). It is situated on a narrow valley in the Taurus Mountains. It is about 5 kilometres (3.1 mi) from state highway D.750. Distance to Ulukışla is 30 kilometres (19 mi) and to Niğde is 80 kilometres (50 mi). The history of the village hasn't been researched yet, but cuneiform on some rocks around the village implies a deep history. The present population of the village is probably of Central Asian origin.

The main agricultural products are green beans, cherries, grapes, apples, peaches, some cereals and potatoes.
