= Kılan, Ulukışla =

Kılan Aktoprak
- Village
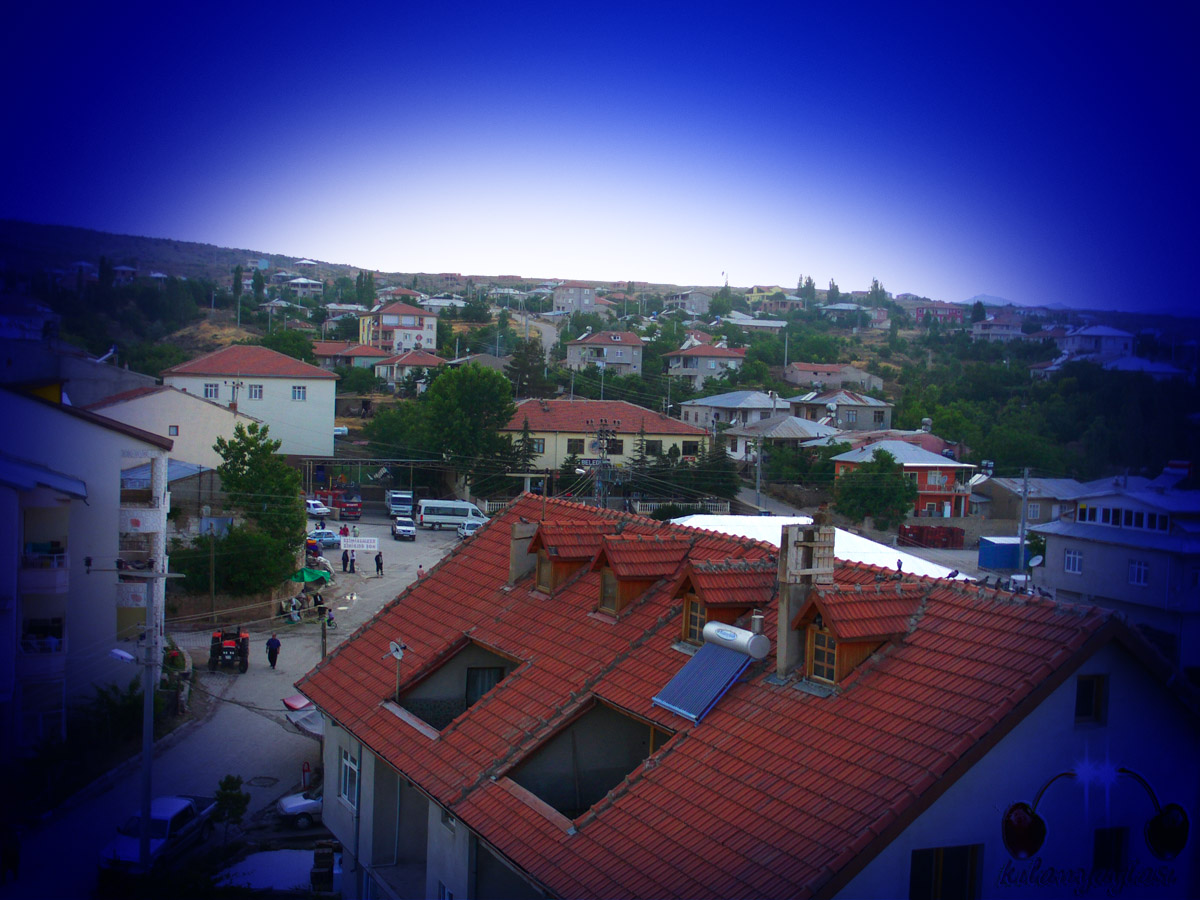

- Location within Turkey Location within Turkey Central Anatolia
- Coordinates: 37°28′52″N 34°27′55″E
- Country: Turkey
- Province: Niğde
- District: Ulukışla
- Elevation: 1,519 m (4,984 ft)
- Population (2022): 1,596
- Time zone: UTC+3 (TRT)
- Postal code: 51910
- Area code: 0388

Kılan (also known as Aktoprak) is a village in Ulukışla District, Niğde Province, Turkey. Its population is 1,596 (2022). Before the 2013 reorganisation, it was a town (belde).

Probably the earliest settlement was established during the Roman Empire era. About 250 years ago, during the Ottoman Empire era, a Turkmen tribe named Kılanoğulları ('sons of Kılan') settled around the village. In 1989 the municipality of Kılan was established and Kılan was declared a belde ('seat of township') . However in 2015 the municipality was disestablished.

The main economic activity is agriculture and animal husbandry. The main crop is cherry.
