= Güney, Ulukışla =

Güney
- Village
- Location within Turkey Location within Turkey Central Anatolia
- Coordinates: 37°37′59″N 34°29′41″E
- Country: Turkey
- Province: Niğde
- District: Ulukışla
- Population (2022): 226
- Time zone: UTC+3 (TRT)
- Postal code: 51902
- Area code: 0388

Güney is a village in Ulukışla District of Niğde Province, Turkey. Its population is 226 (2022).
