= Porsuk, Ulukışla =

Porsuk
- Village
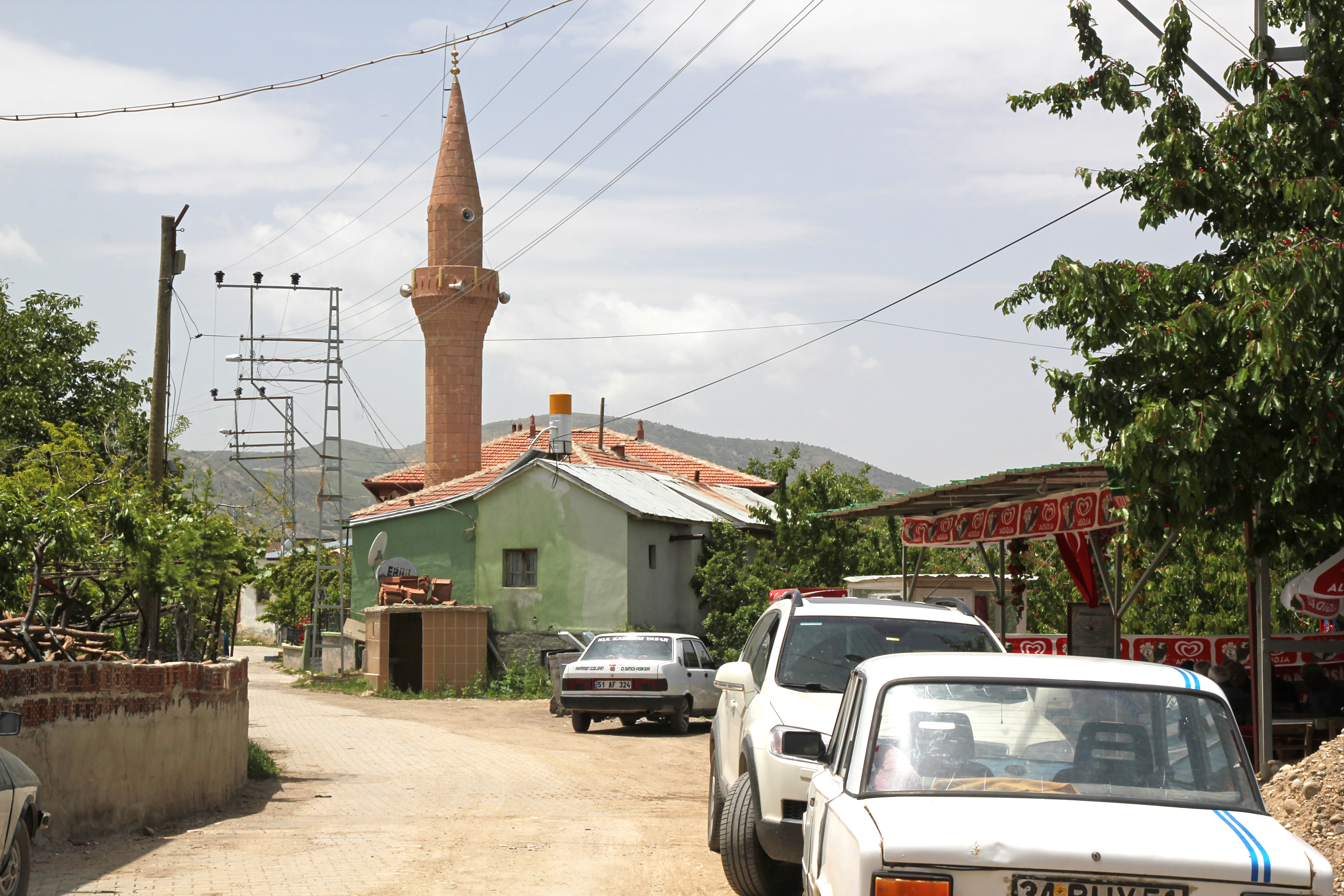
- Porsuk

- Location within Turkey Location within Turkey Central Anatolia
- Coordinates: 37°32′N 34°35′E
- Country: Turkey
- Province: Niğde
- District: Ulukışla
- Population (2022): 291
- Time zone: UTC+3 (TRT)
- Area code: 0388

Porsuk is a village in Ulukışla District, Niğde Province, Turkey. Its population is 291 (2022).

== Economy ==
Agricultural products of the village are tomatoes, cucumbers, beans, potatoes, onions, peppers, corn, peas, sunflowers, lentils, cabbage, cherry, sour cherry, apple, peach, pear, mulberry, blackberry, grape, walnut, plum, apricot.

== Village Society ==
Old Porsuk village headmen: Ömer Erdem, Hacı Ali Güldür, Mulla Mehmet Ünal, Rıza Arıkan, İbrahim Zeki Erdem. At the present time, Ramazan Ünsal is the reeve since 2005.

== See also ==
- Porsuk Inscription
