= Başmakçı, Ulukışla =

Başmakçı
- Village
- Location within Turkey Location within Turkey Central Anatolia
- Coordinates: 37°39′30″N 34°43′10″E
- Country: Turkey
- Province: Niğde
- District: Ulukışla
- Population (2022): 189
- Time zone: UTC+3 (TRT)

Başmakçı is a village in Ulukışla District, Niğde Province, Turkey. Its population is 189 (2022). It has been identified as the site of ancient Faustinopolis.
