= Madenköy =

- Village
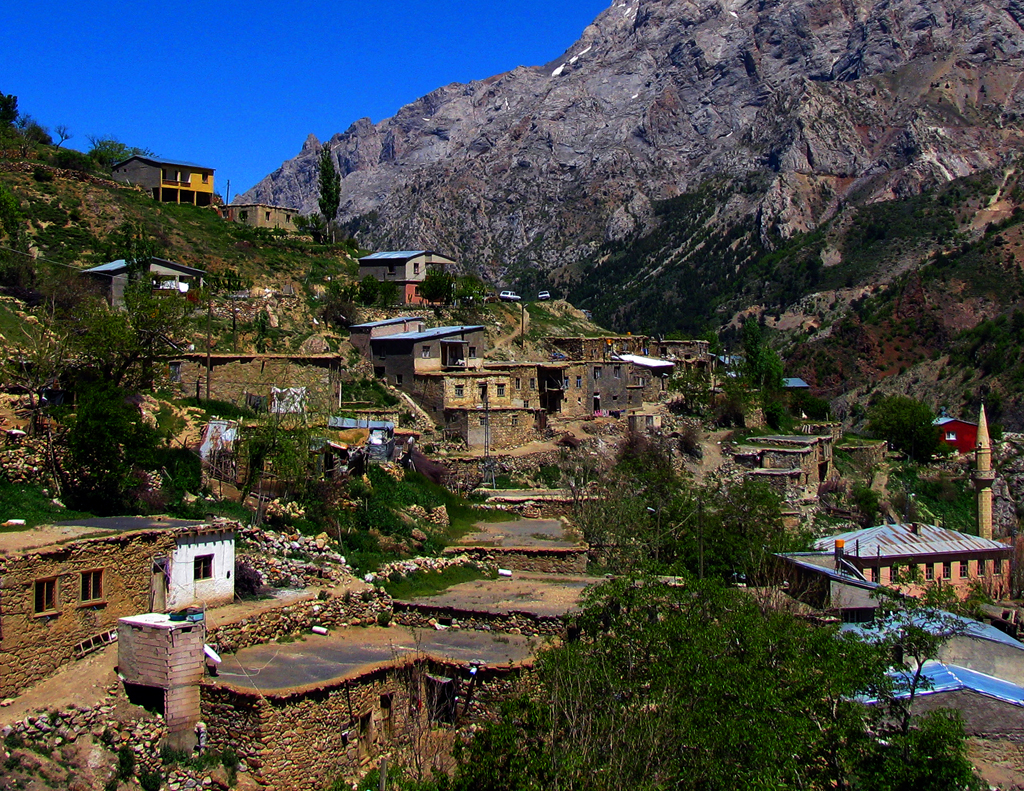
- Madenköy

- Location within Turkey Location within Turkey Central Anatolia
- Coordinates: 37°27′N 34°38′E
- Country: Turkey
- Province: Niğde
- District: Ulukışla
- Elevation: 1,730 m (5,680 ft)
- Population (2022): 172
- Time zone: UTC+3 (TRT)
- Postal code: 51900
- Area code: 0388

Madenköy (literally village of mines) is a village in Ulukışla District of Niğde Province, Turkey. Its population is 172 (2022). It is situated in high reaches in Toros Mountains. It is about 15 kilometres (9.3 mi) to state highway D.750. Distance to Ulukışla is 40 kilometres (25 mi) and to Niğde is 90 kilometres (56 mi). There is a small lake at the west of the village and the frog species Rana holtzi inhabits the shore of the lake. A mining company plans to open gold mines around the village . But villagers oppose the plan.

== See also ==
- Karagöl
