= Ulukışla District =

District of Niğde Province, Turkey

- District
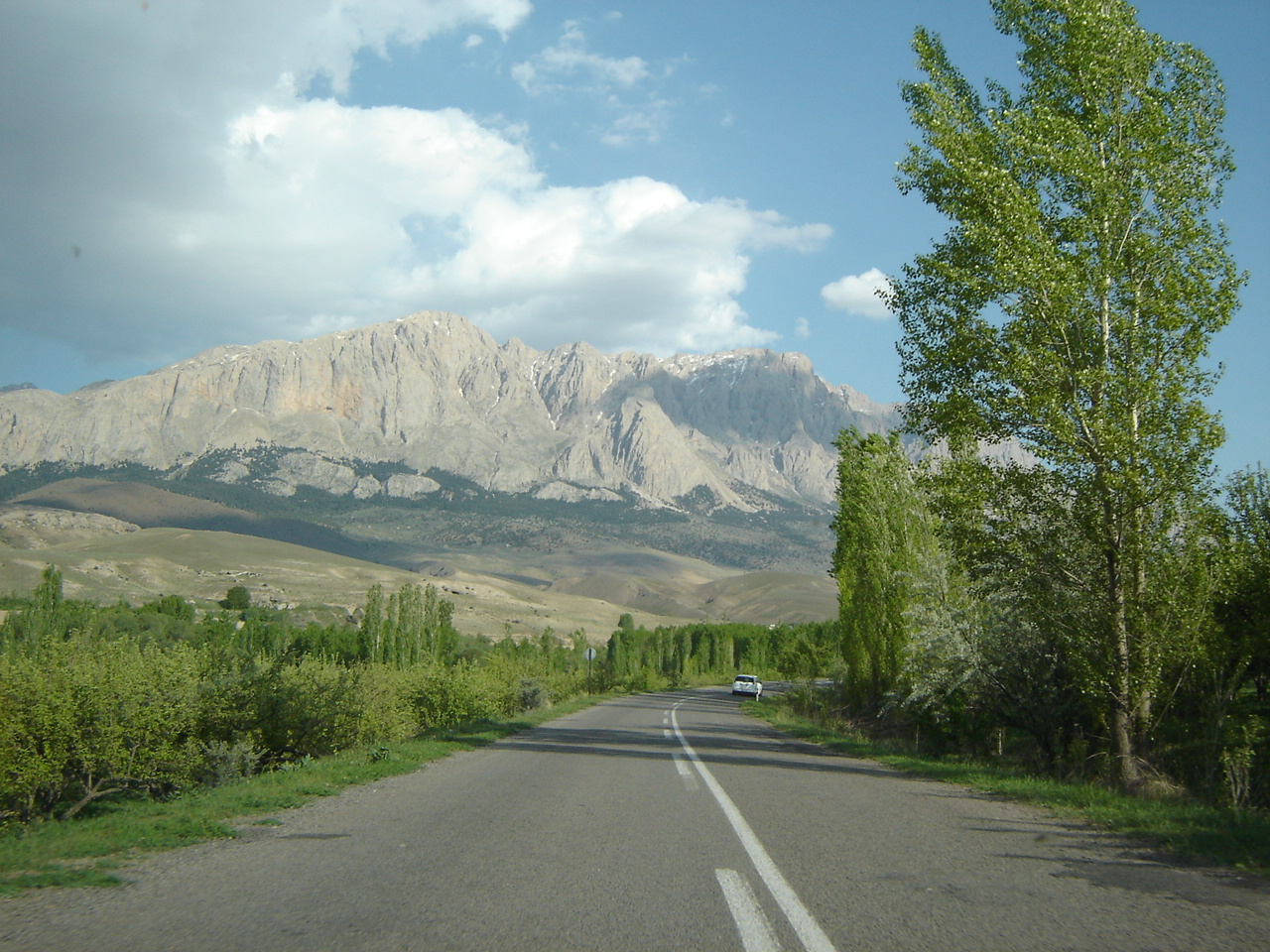
- Ulukışla landscape

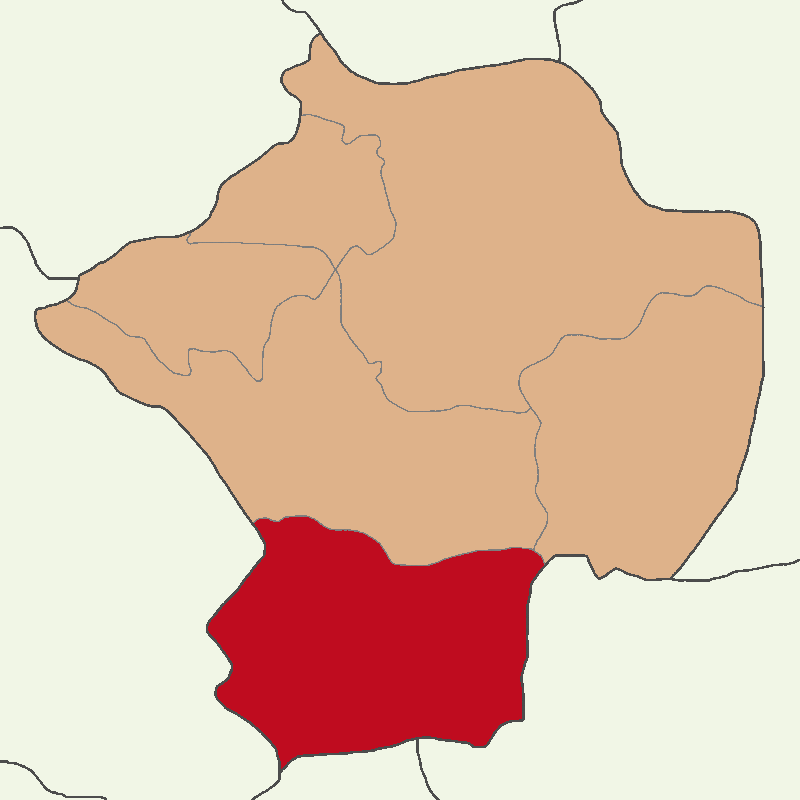
- Map showing Ulukışla District in Niğde Province

- Location within Turkey Location within Turkey Central Anatolia
- Coordinates: 37°33′N 34°29′E
- Country: Turkey
- Province: Niğde
- Seat: Ulukışla

Government
  - Kaymakam: Uğur Muzaffer Çam
- Area: 1,375 km^{2} (531 sq mi)
- Population (2022): 18,983
  - Density: 13.81/km^{2} (35.76/sq mi)
- Time zone: UTC+3 (TRT)
- Website: www.ulukisla.gov.tr

Ulukışla District is a district of the Niğde Province of Turkey. Its seat is the town of Ulukışla. Its area is 1,375 km^{2}, and its population is 18,983 (2022).

== Composition ==
There is one municipality in Ulukışla District:

- Ulukışla

There are 38 villages in Ulukışla District:

- Alihoca
- Altay
- Ardıçlı
- Başmakçı
- Bayağıl
- Çanakçı
- Çiftehan
- Çifteköy
- Darboğaz
- Elmalı
- Eminlik
- Emirler
- Gedelli
- Gümüşköy
- Güney
- Hacıbekirli
- Handere
- Hasangazi
- Horoz
- Hüsniye
- İlhanköy
- İmrahor
- Karacaören
- Kılan
- Koçak
- Kolsuz
- Köşkönü
- Kozluca
- Madenköy
- Ovacık
- Porsuk
- Şeyhömerli
- Tabaklı
- Tekneçukur
- Tepeköy
- Toraman
- Ünlüyaka
- Yeniyıldız
