= Dolomite =

Dolomite may refer to:

- Dolomite (mineral), a carbonate mineral
- Dolomite (rock), also known as dolostone, a sedimentary carbonate rock
- Dolomite, Alabama, United States, an unincorporated community
- Dolomite, California, United States, an unincorporated community
- Dolomites, a section of the Alps
- Lienz Dolomites, a mountain range in Austria
- Lucanian Dolomites, a mountain range in southern Italy
- Manila Dolomite Beach, formally known as the Manila Baywalk Dolomite Beach, an urban artificial beach in Manila, Philippines
- Triumph Dolomite (1934–1940), a sporting car made by Triumph Motor Company
- Triumph Dolomite, a small car made by the British Leyland Corporation in the 1970s and 1980s

== See also ==
- Dolemite, 1975 blaxploitation feature film and the name of its principal character
  - Shaolin Dolemite, a 1999 in-name-only sequel to Dolemite
  - "Dolemite", the opening track on Tore Down House, a 1997 album by Scott Henderson; the track features samples from the film
- Dolemite Is My Name, 2019 American biographical comedy film
- Dolomiten, a German-language newspaper published in South Tyrol, Italy
