= Faustinopolis =

Ancient Roman city in modern Turkey

Coordinates: 37°38′24″N 34°41′3″E

Faustinopolis or Phaustinoupolis (Ancient Greek: Φαυστινόπολις), also Colonia Faustinopolis and Halala, was an ancient city in the south of Cappadocia, about 20 km south of Tyana. It was named after the empress Faustina, the wife of Marcus Aurelius, who died in a village there. Her husband, by establishing a colony in it, raised it to the rank of a town under the name of Faustinopolis. Hierocles assigns the place to Cappadocia Secunda, and it is also mentioned in the Antonine and Jerusalem Itineraries. The town was close to the defiles of the Cilician Gates, and was likely situated at modern-day Başmakçı, Niğde Province, Turkey. Following the Muslim conquests and the subsequent Arab raids, the site was abandoned for the nearby fortress of Loulon.

Faustinopolis was a suffragan see of the Metropolis of Tyana, together with Cybistra and Sasima.

Faustinopolis is a titular see of the Roman Catholic Church.
