= Mount Medetsiz =

Mountain in Turkey

- Location within Turkey

Highest point
- Elevation: 3,524 m (11,562 ft)
- Prominence: 2,067 m (6,781 ft)
- Coordinates: 37°23′33″N 34°37′59″E

Geography
- Location: Çamlıyayla, Mersin Province, Turkey
- Parent range: Toros Mountains

Medetsiz Mountain (Turkish: Medetsiz Dağı) is a summit in Toros Mountains range of Turkey. It is a part of Çamlıyayla (ilçe) (district) of Mersin Province. Its distance to the sea is about 65 kilometres (40 mi), as the crow flies. The altitude of the summit is 3,524 metres (11,562 ft). The north of the submit is a high cliff and the ramp to the south is relatively more gentle.

== See also ==
- List of ultras of West Asia
