= Ulukışla =

- Municipality
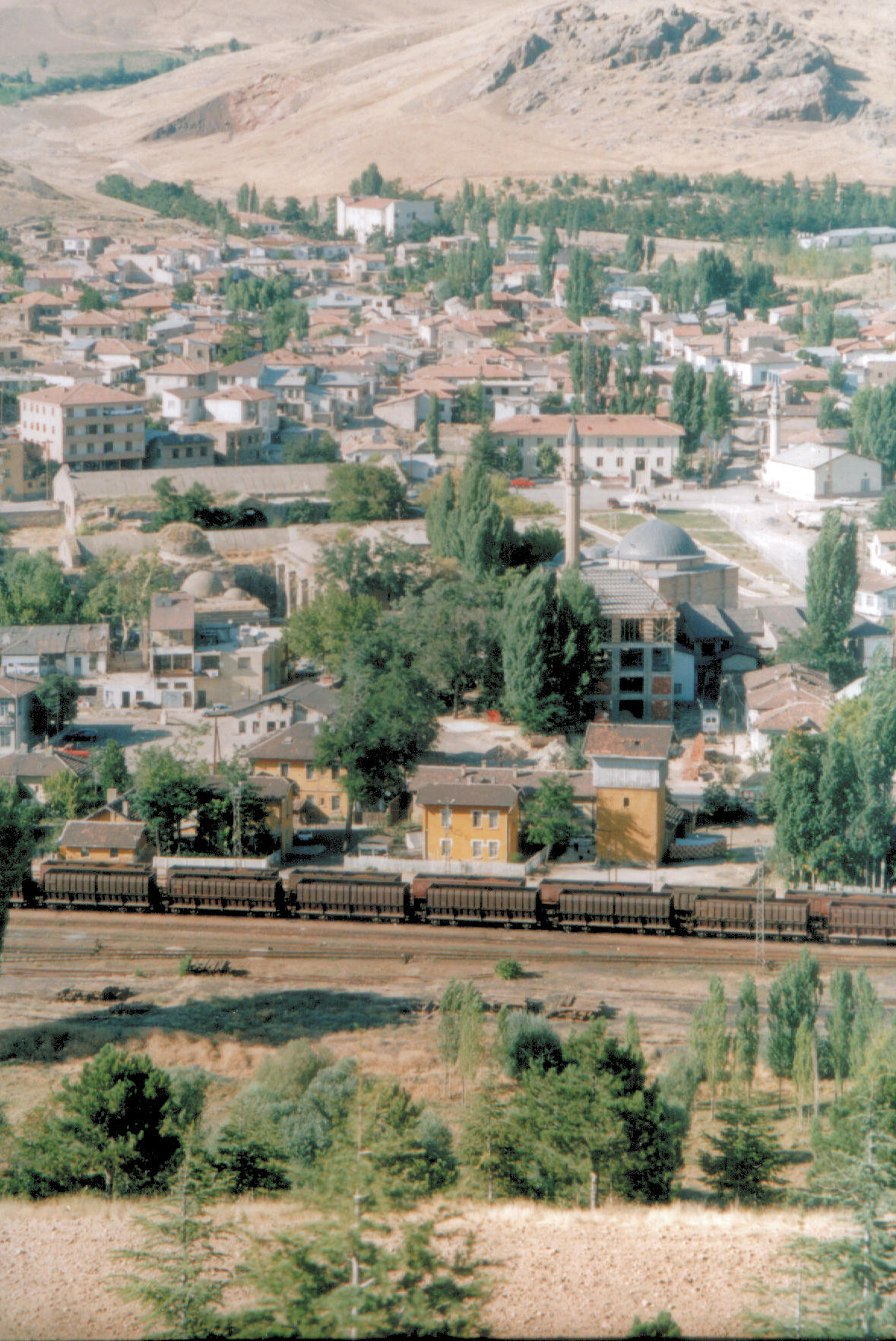
- General view of Ulukışla

- Location within Turkey Location within Turkey Central Anatolia
- Coordinates: 37°32′48″N 34°29′04″E
- Country: Turkey
- Province: Niğde
- District: Ulukışla

Government
  - Mayor: Ali Uğurlu (AKP)
- Elevation: 1,427 m (4,682 ft)
- Population (2022): 5,696
- Time zone: UTC+3 (TRT)
- Area code: 0388
- Website: www.ulukisla.bel.tr

Ulukışla is a town in Niğde Province in the Central Anatolia region of Turkey. It is the seat of Ulukışla District. Its population is 5,696 (2022). Its altitude is 1,427 m.

The town of Ulukışla lies in a valley between the Medetsiz and Bolkar ranges of the Taurus Mountains.

== History ==
According to the Ottoman General Census of 1881/82-1893, the kaza of Ulukışla had a total population of 9,182, consisting of 7,851 Muslims and 1,331 Greeks.

== Climate ==
Ulukışla has a cold semi-arid climate (Köppen: BSk), with warm, dry summers, and cold winters.

Climate data for Ulukışla (1991–2020)
Month	Jan	Feb	Mar	Apr	May	Jun	Jul	Aug	Sep	Oct	Nov	Dec	Year
Mean daily maximum °C (°F)	3.5 (38.3)	5.3 (41.5)	10.0 (50.0)	15.1 (59.2)	20.2 (68.4)	25.0 (77.0)	29.0 (84.2)	29.0 (84.2)	24.8 (76.6)	18.5 (65.3)	11.1 (52.0)	5.8 (42.4)	16.5 (61.7)
Daily mean °C (°F)	−1.4 (29.5)	−0.1 (31.8)	4.1 (39.4)	9.0 (48.2)	13.6 (56.5)	18.0 (64.4)	21.8 (71.2)	21.7 (71.1)	17.4 (63.3)	11.8 (53.2)	5.2 (41.4)	0.7 (33.3)	10.2 (50.4)
Mean daily minimum °C (°F)	−5.3 (22.5)	−4.4 (24.1)	−0.7 (30.7)	3.5 (38.3)	7.4 (45.3)	11.1 (52.0)	14.0 (57.2)	14.1 (57.4)	10.3 (50.5)	6.0 (42.8)	0.5 (32.9)	−3.1 (26.4)	4.5 (40.1)
Average precipitation mm (inches)	29.13 (1.15)	26.12 (1.03)	36.24 (1.43)	45.83 (1.80)	46.33 (1.82)	32.8 (1.29)	8.36 (0.33)	5.14 (0.20)	11.11 (0.44)	24.2 (0.95)	28.76 (1.13)	36.95 (1.45)	330.97 (13.03)
Average precipitation days (≥ 1.0 mm)	5.2	5.7	6.1	7.2	7.2	4.5	2.1	1.5	2.2	4.2	4.3	5.7	55.9
Average relative humidity (%)	76.1	73.2	66.2	61.5	59.0	53.0	43.9	44.0	48.6	60.0	66.9	74.4	60.5
Source: NOAA
