= List of railway companies in Turkey =

The following railways operate or operated in Anatolia, Turkey and in former lands of the Ottoman Empire.

== Operating railways ==
=== Common carriers ===
Railway	Mark	Start Year	End Year	Successor	Notes
Turkish State Railways	TCDD	1927			Only common carrier in Turkey.
İZBAN	İZBAN	2010			Commuter railway, owned 50% by TCDD.

=== Urban railways ===
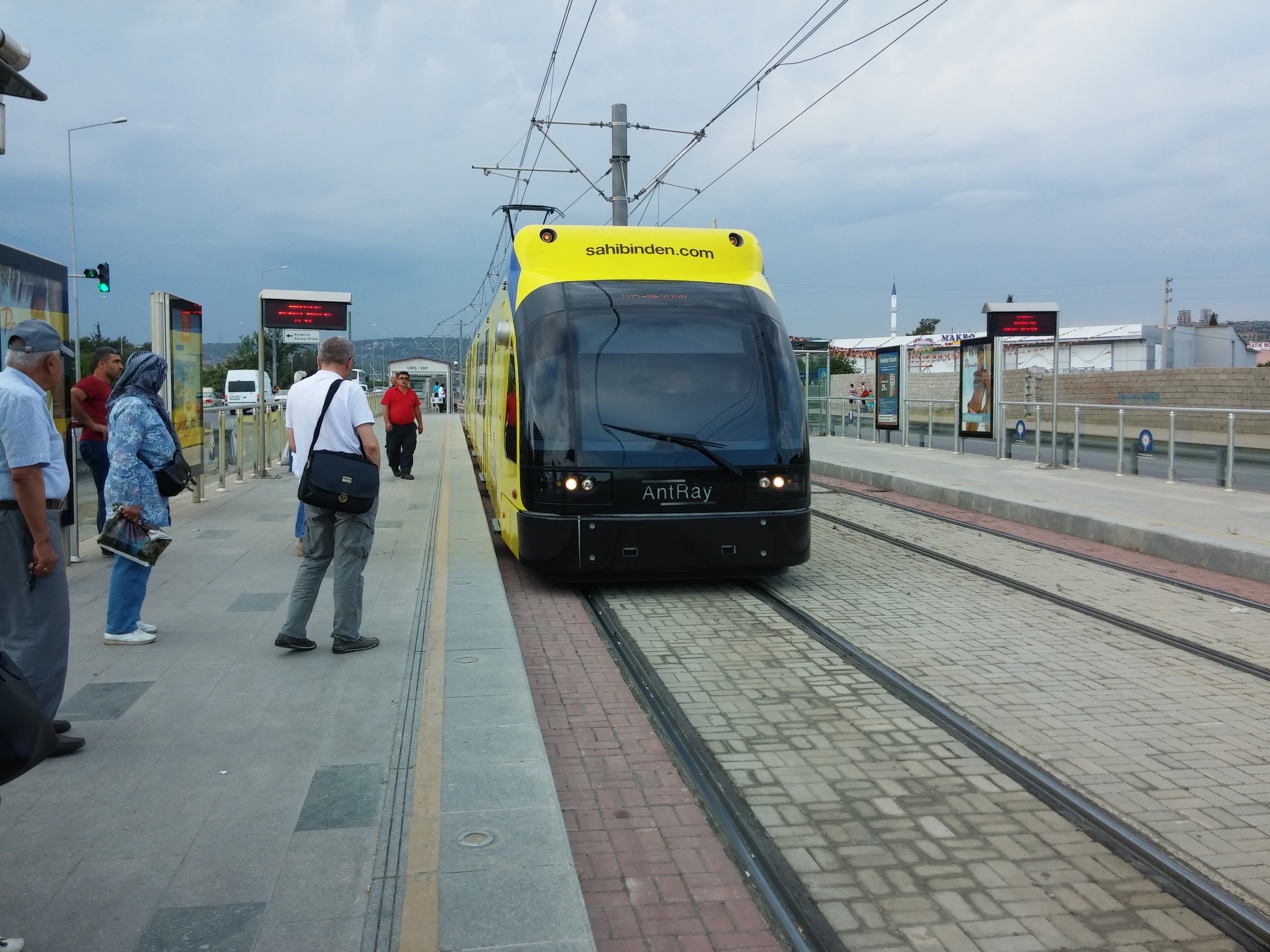
AntRay

- Adana Metro
- Ankara Metro
- Antray
- Bursaray
- EsTram
- Samsun Tram
- İETT - Istanbul Urban Railways
- Izmir Metro
- Konya Tramway

== Defunct railways ==
=== Common carriers ===
Railway	Mark	Start Year	End Year	Successor	Notes
Ottoman Railway Company	ORC	1856	1935	Turkish State Railways	First railway in Anatolia
Smyrne Cassaba & Prolongements	SCP	1863	1935	Turkish State Railways	
Chemins de fer Orientaux	CO	1868	1927	TCDD, CFFH, BDZ and others	This major railway operated in the European part of the Ottoman Empire.
Transcaucasus Railway		1872	1924	Eastern Railway and Soviet Railways	Russian railway, operated a rail line into Kars.
Chemins de fer Ottomans d'Anatolie	CFOA	1880	1924	Chemins de fer d'Anatolie Baghdad	
Mersin-Tarsus-Adana Railway	MTA	1886	1906	Chemins du Fer Impérial Ottomans de Bagdad	
Mudanya-Bursa Railway	CFMB	1892	1931	Turkish State Railways	Not connected to the national system.
Berlin–Baghdad railway	CFIO	1899	1924	Chemins de fer d'Anatolie Baghdad	Baghdad Railway
Anatolian Baghdad Railways		1924	1927	Turkish State Railways	
Samsun–Çarşamba railway		1924	1929	Turkish State Railways	750mm narrow gauge line. Not connected to the national network.
Eastern Railway (Turkey)		1925	1927	Turkish State Railways	1,520mm broad gauge and 750mm narrow gauge line. Not connected to the national network until 1939.
State Railways and Seaports Administration		1924	1927	Turkish State Railways	
Southern Railway (Turkey)	CD	1933	1948	Turkish State Railways	
Ottoman Government		1872	1873	Chemins de Fer Ottomans d'Anatolie	Operated a railway line from Istanbul to Izmit.
Cillicia and Northern Syria Railway	CNS	1918	1927	Chemins de Fer Bozanti Alep Nissibine et Prolongements	
Chemins de Fer Bozanti Alep Nissibine et Prolongements	BANP	1927	1933	Southern Railways	

=== Defunct urban railways ===
Name	Start Year	End Year	Successor
Société des Tramways de Constantinople	1871	1939	IETT
Üsküdar Kadıköy Halk Tramwayları	1928	1939	IETT
Trams in İzmir	1890	1960s	
