= Arıkören railway station =

Railway Station in Turkey

ARIKÖREN
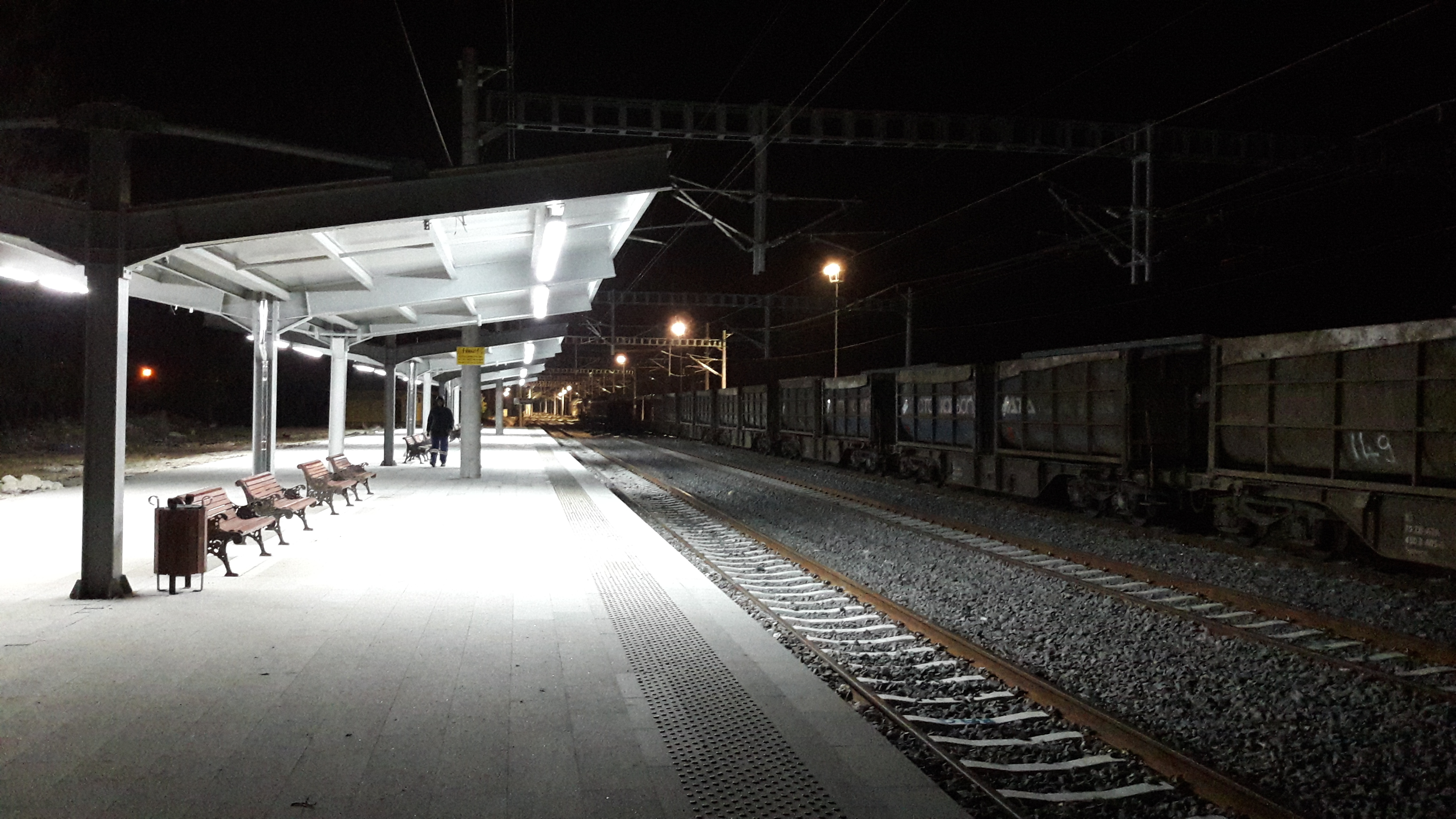

General information
- Location: Arıkören Köyü İç Yolu, Arıkören Köyü, 42508 Çumra/Konya; Turkey
- Coordinates: 37.460644°N 32.927941°E
- System: TCDD Intercity rail station
- Owner: Turkish State Railways
- Line: Konya-Yenice railway
- Platforms: 1 side platform

Construction
- Structure type: At-grade
- Parking: Yes

History
- Opened: 25 October 1904

Services
Preceding station	TCDD Taşımacılık	Following station
Çumra towards Konya	Taurus Express	Karaman towards Adana
Çumra towards Konya	Konya–Karaman	Karaman Terminus
Location

Arıkören station is a station in Arıkören in Turkey, on the Konya-Yenice railway. It is serviced by the Taurus Express and the Konya-Karaman Regional, which the later serves as a connecting train to Karaman for YHT trains terminating in Konya. The station was opened on 25 October 1904 by the Baghdad Railway.

Arıkören station is 61.9 km (38.5 mi) southeast of Konya station and 307.1 km (190.8 mi) northwest of Adana station.
