= Kaşınhan railway station =

Railway Station in Turkey

KAŞINHAN
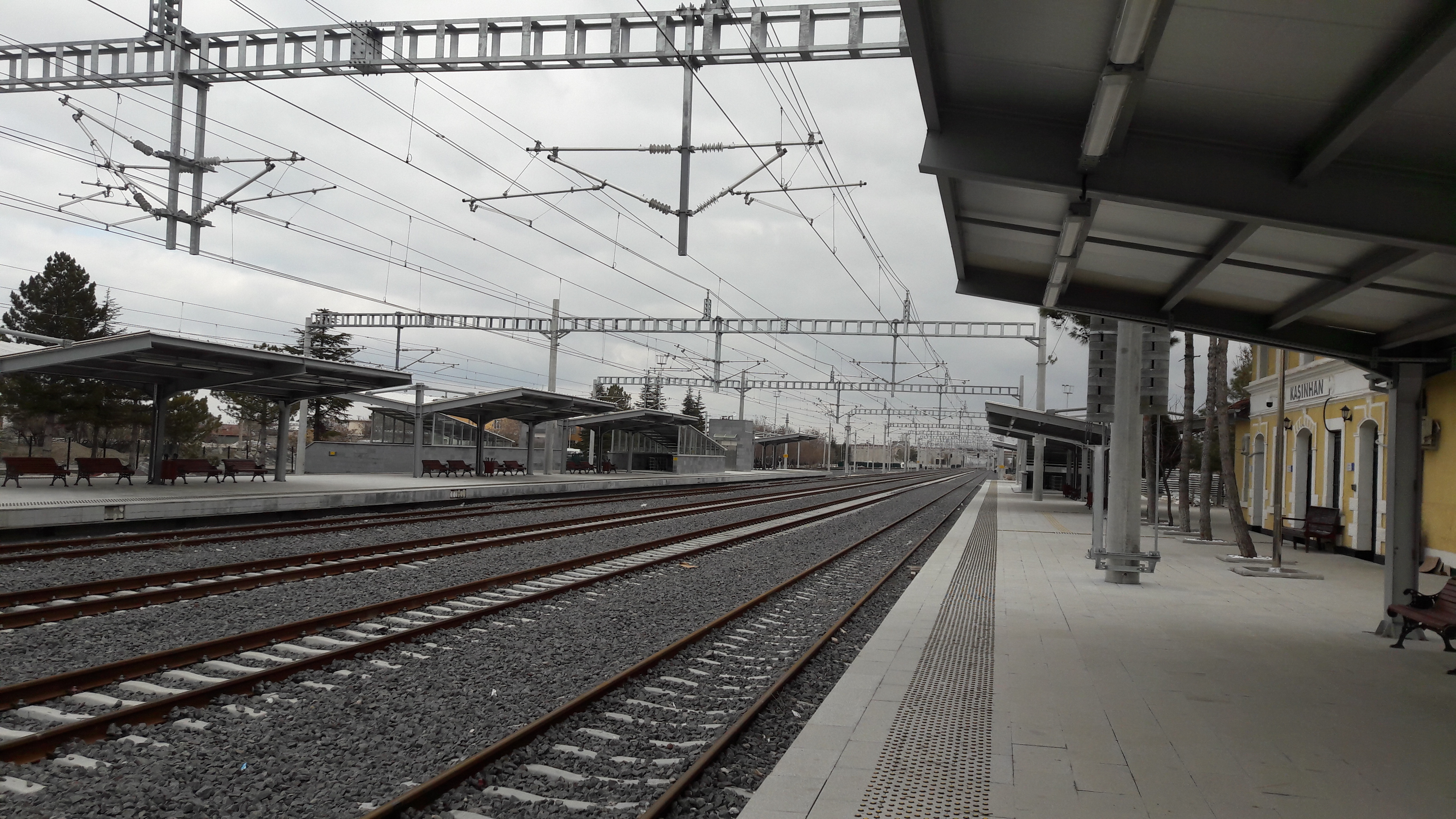

General information
- Location: Kaşınhanı, 42005 Meram/Konya; Turkey
- Coordinates: 37.701944°N 32.570000°E
- System: TCDD Regional rail station
- Owner: Turkish State Railways
- Line: Konya-Yenice railway
- Platforms: 2 side platform

Construction
- Structure type: At-grade
- Parking: Yes

History
- Opened: 25 October 1904

Services
| Preceding station | TCDD Taşımacılık | Following station |
|---|---|---|
| Konya Terminus | Konya–Karaman | Çumra towards Karaman |
Location

Kaşınhan station is a station in Kaşınhanı in Turkey, on the Konya-Yenice railway. It is serviced by the Konya-Karaman Regional, which the later serves as a connecting train to Karaman for YHT trains terminating in Konya. The station was opened on 25 October 1904 by the Baghdad Railway.

Kaşınhan station is 20.3 km (12.6 mi) southeast of Konya station and 348.6 km (216.6 mi) northwest of Adana station.
