= Çumra railway station =

Railway station in Konya, Turkey

Çumra
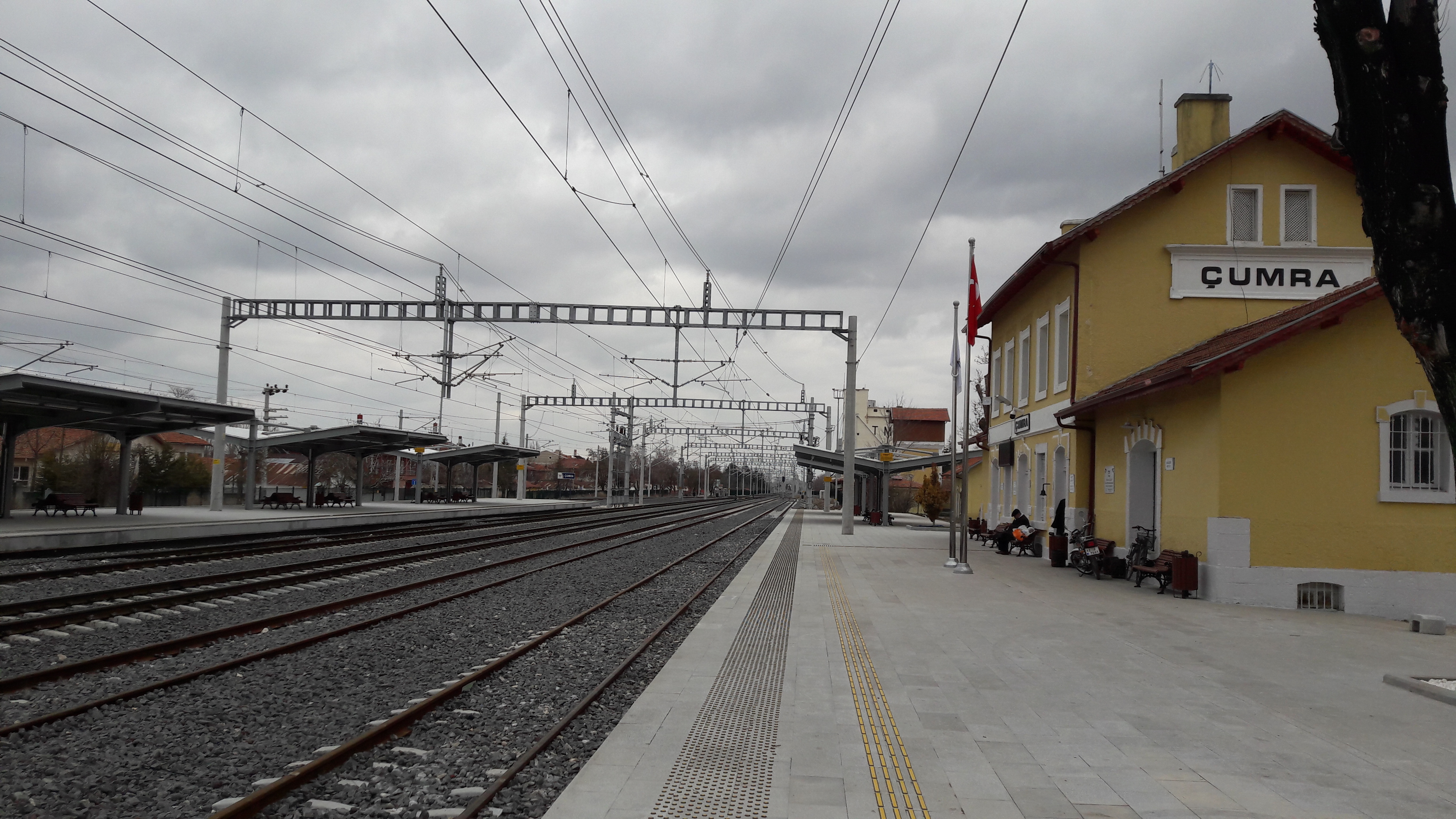

General information
- Location: Şeyh Şamil Cd., İzzetbey Mah., 42500 Çumra/Konya; Turkey
- Coordinates: 37.571802°N 32.784087°E
- System: TCDD Intercity rail station
- Owner: TCDD
- Line: Konya-Yenice railway
- Platforms: 1 side platform

Construction
- Structure type: At-grade
- Parking: Yes

History
- Opened: 25 October 1904

Services
Preceding station	TCDD Taşımacılık	Following station
Konya towards Ankara	Yüksek Hızlı Tren	Karaman Terminus
Konya towards Istanbul Halkalı	Yüksek Hızlı Tren	Karaman Terminus
Kaşınhan towards Konya	Taurus Express	Arıkören towards Adana
Kaşınhan towards Konya	Konya–Karaman	Arıkören towards Karaman
Location

Çumra station is a station in Çumra, Turkey, on the Konya-Yenice railway. It is serviced by the Taurus Express and the Konya-Karaman Regional, which also serves as a connecting train to Karaman for YHT trains terminating in Konya. The station was opened on 25 October 1904 by the Baghdad Railway.

Çumra station is 44.2 km (27.5 mi) southeast of Konya station and 324.8 km (201.8 mi) northwest of Adana station.
