= KonyaRay =

Commuter rail system in Konya, Turkey

Overview
- Status: Under Construction
- Owner: Turkish State Railways and Konya Metropolitan Municipality
- Locale: Konya, Turkey
- Termini: 2. Organize; Yaylapınar
- Stations: 19

Service
- Type: Commuter rail
- Operator(s): TCDD Taşımacılık
- Daily ridership: 90000 (expected)

Technical
- Line length: 26 km (16 mi)
- Number of tracks: 2
- Track gauge: 1,435 mm (4 ft 8 1/2 in) standard gauge
- Electrification: 25 kV, 50 Hz AC Overhead line

Konyaray is a commuter rail line under construction in Konya, Turkey. It will consist of one, 26 km line running from Yaylapınar to the Konya Organized Industry Zone. The system will have 19 stops and will run via the airport and the Konya railway station. The name, like all commuter rail system names in Turkey, is a portmanteau of the word Konya and ray, which is the Turkish word for rail. The goal of the line is to provide better transport links for Konya's industrial zones.

== History ==
The groundbreaking ceremony was held on 30 April 2023. The first phase running from the airport to the Konya railway station is scheduled to be open in 2025. The second phase will extend the line northwards from the airport to the Organised Industrial Zone, and southwards from the city centre to Yaylapinar, taking the total length of the line to 26 km. The line will run alongside the existing Ankara-Konya high-speed railway.

The actual construction works began on 17 July 2023, after it was revealed that the groundbreaking ceremony was only "symbolic".

== Stations ==
There will be 19 stations in total.

Name	Station	District	Notes
1	2. Sanayi	Selçuklu	Konya Organized Industry Zone
2	Bilim Merkezi	Selçuklu	Konya Science Centre
3	Havaalanı	Selçuklu	Konya Airport
4	Jet Üssü	Selçuklu	Türk Yıldızları Park
5	Aksaray Kavşağı	Selçuklu	Konya Exhibition Centre
6	Horozluhan	Selçuklu	
7	Aykent	Selçuklu	Aykent Shoemakers Industrial Estate
8	1. Organize	Selçuklu	Konya Organized Industry Zone
9	Mobilyacılar	Selçuklu	Konya Mobilyacılar Industry Zone
10	Yht Garı	Selçuklu	Selçuklu high speed railway station
11	Kule Site	Selçuklu	Kule Site Mall
12	Rauf Denktaş	Selçuklu	
13	Belediye	Selçuklu	
14	Konya Gar	Meram	Konya railway station
15	Meram Belediyesi	Meram	Meram Municipality
16	Çeçenistan	Meram	
17	Kovanağzı	Meram	
18	Hadimi	Meram	
19	Yaylapınar	Meram	

== See also ==
- Transport in Turkey
- Turkish State Railways
- Konya Metro
