= Selçuklu YHT railway station =

Railway station in Selçuklu, Konya, Turkey

Selçuklu YHT
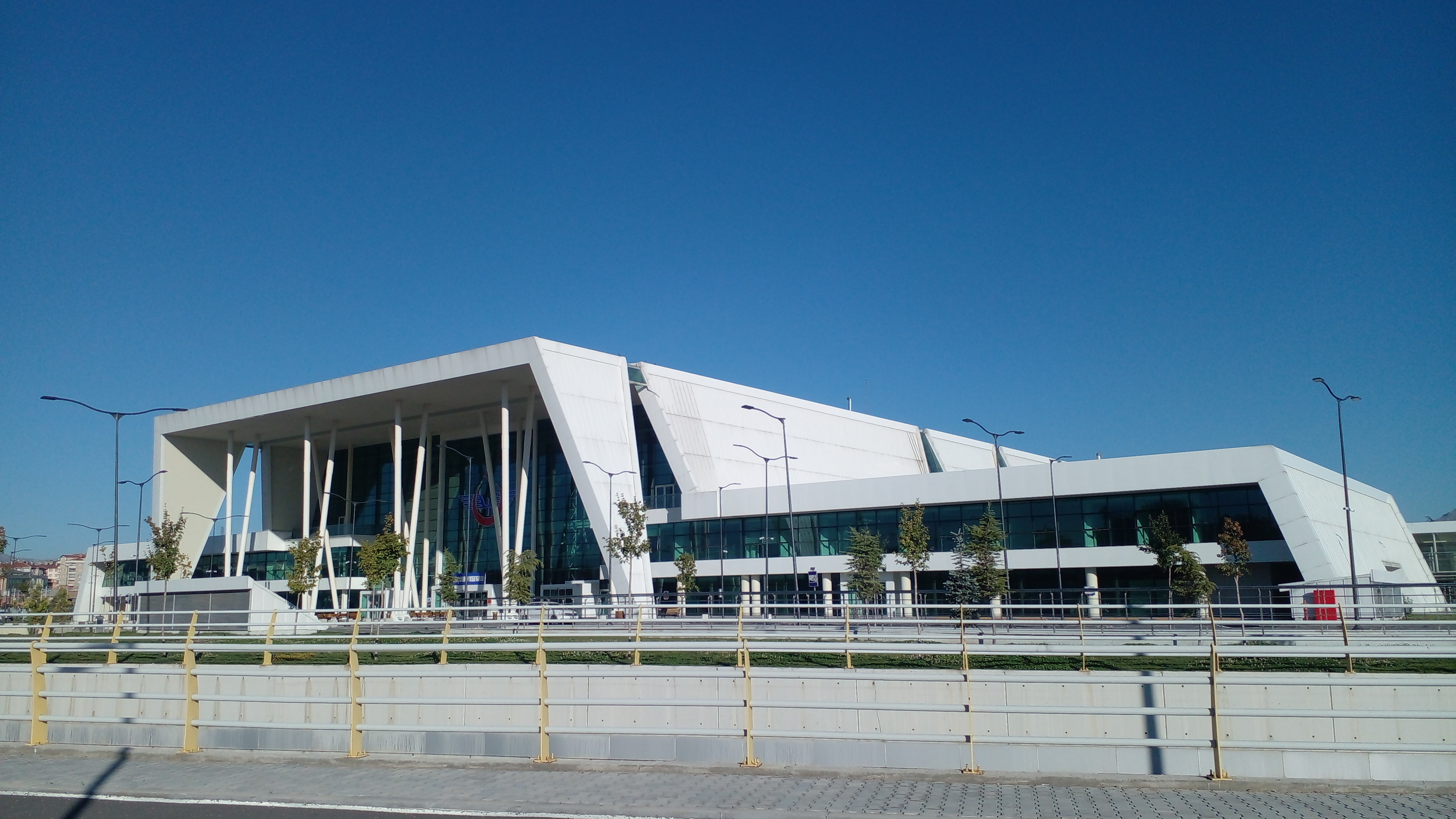
- The station, 2022

General information
- Other names: Konya YHT railway station
- Location: İmadiye Sk No:15, Musalla Bağları, 42060; Selçuklu, Konya
- Coordinates: 37.8977°N 32.4987°E
- Elevation: 1,014 m (3,327 ft)
- System: TCDD Taşımacılık high-speed station
- Owner: Turkish State Railways
- Operator: TCDD Taşımacılık
- Line: Polatlı-Konya high-speed railway
- Platforms: 3 island platforms
- Tracks: 7

Construction
- Parking: Yes
- Architect: Levent Aksaray, Serpil Öztekin
- Architectural style: Neo-futurism

Other information
- Status: Operational

History
- Opened: 2 October 2021
- Electrified: 25 kV, 50 Hz AC OHLE

Services
Preceding station	TCDD Taşımacılık	Following station
Polatlı YHT towards Ankara	Yüksek Hızlı Tren	Konya towards Karaman
Eskişehir towards Istanbul Halkalı	Yüksek Hızlı Tren	Konya towards Karaman
Location

Selçuklu YHT railway station (Turkish: Selçuklu YHT garı), or Selçuklu HSR railway station is a railway station in Konya, Turkey. Opened on 2 October 2021, it is the main high-speed railway station in the city, while Konya station is the main inter-city station. Built on the Polatlı-Konya high-speed railway, the station exclusively services high-speed YHT train from Konya to Ankara and Istanbul. Selçuklu station is the second largest high-speed railway station in Turkey, after Ankara station, with 3 platforms serving 5 tracks and 2 tracks bypassing the station for freight rail.

Escalators work in pairs. Arrivals use the southern escalators to go up and then down to get out. Departures use the northern escalators up to the ticket control, then down to the platform.

== Gallery ==
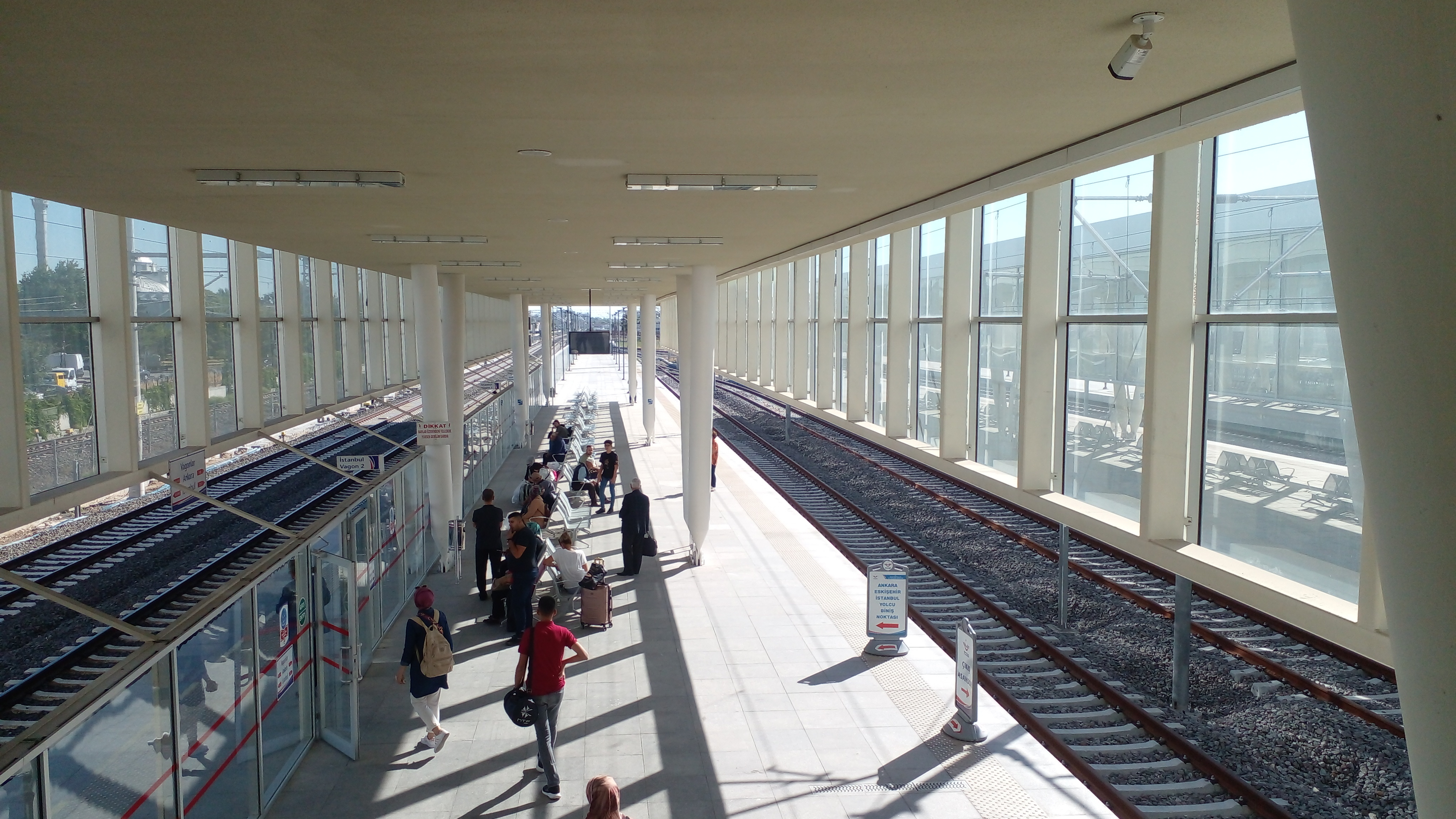
Platform 3 at the Selçuklu YHT station

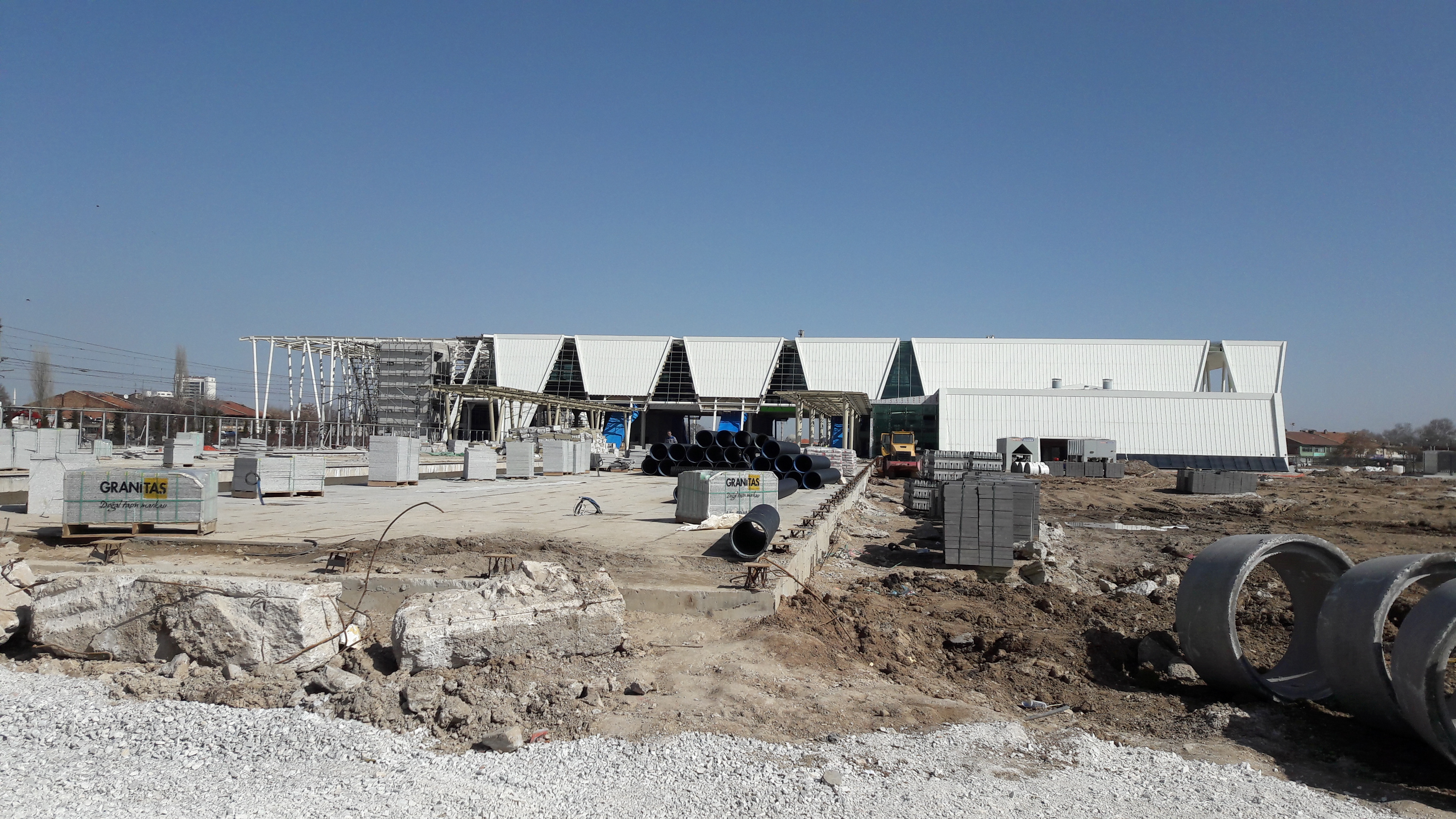
The station, still under construction, in February 2019

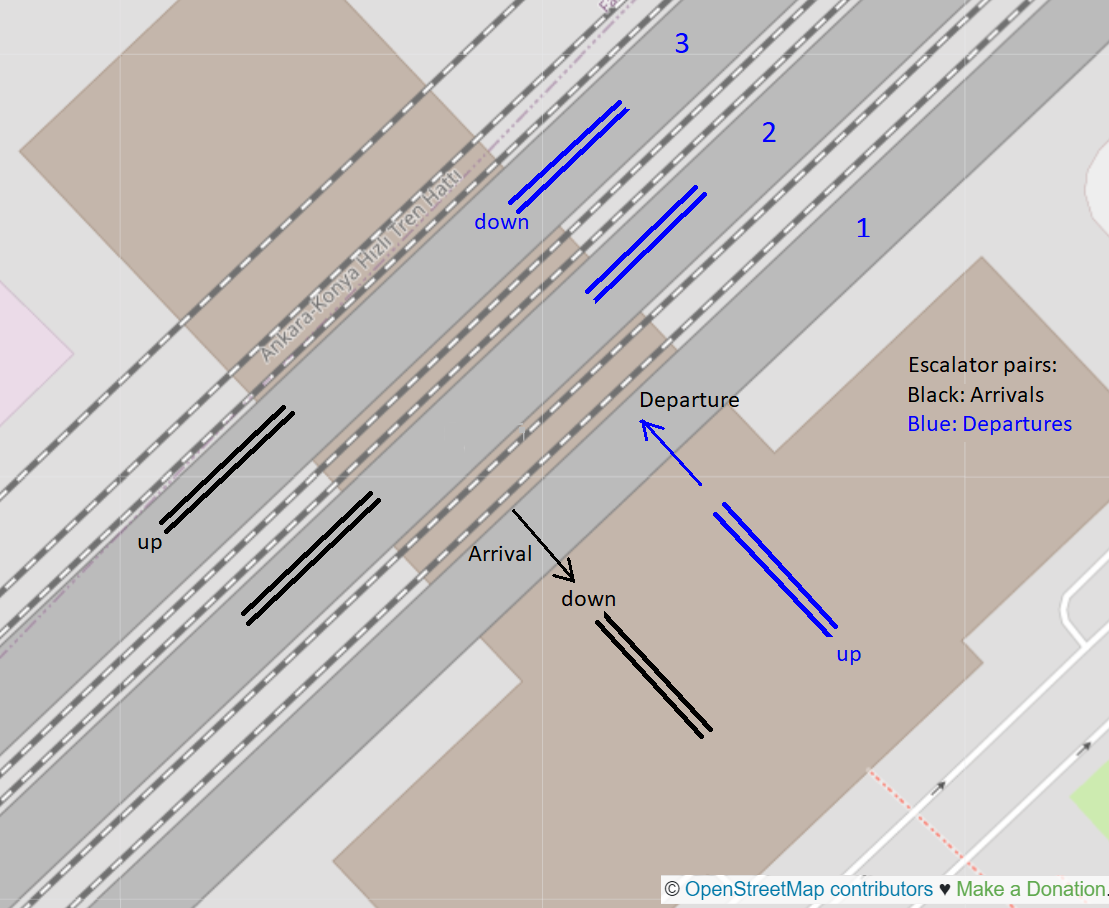
Floor plan of the station
