= Pınarbaşı railway station =

Railway station in Konya, Turkey

Pınarbaşı
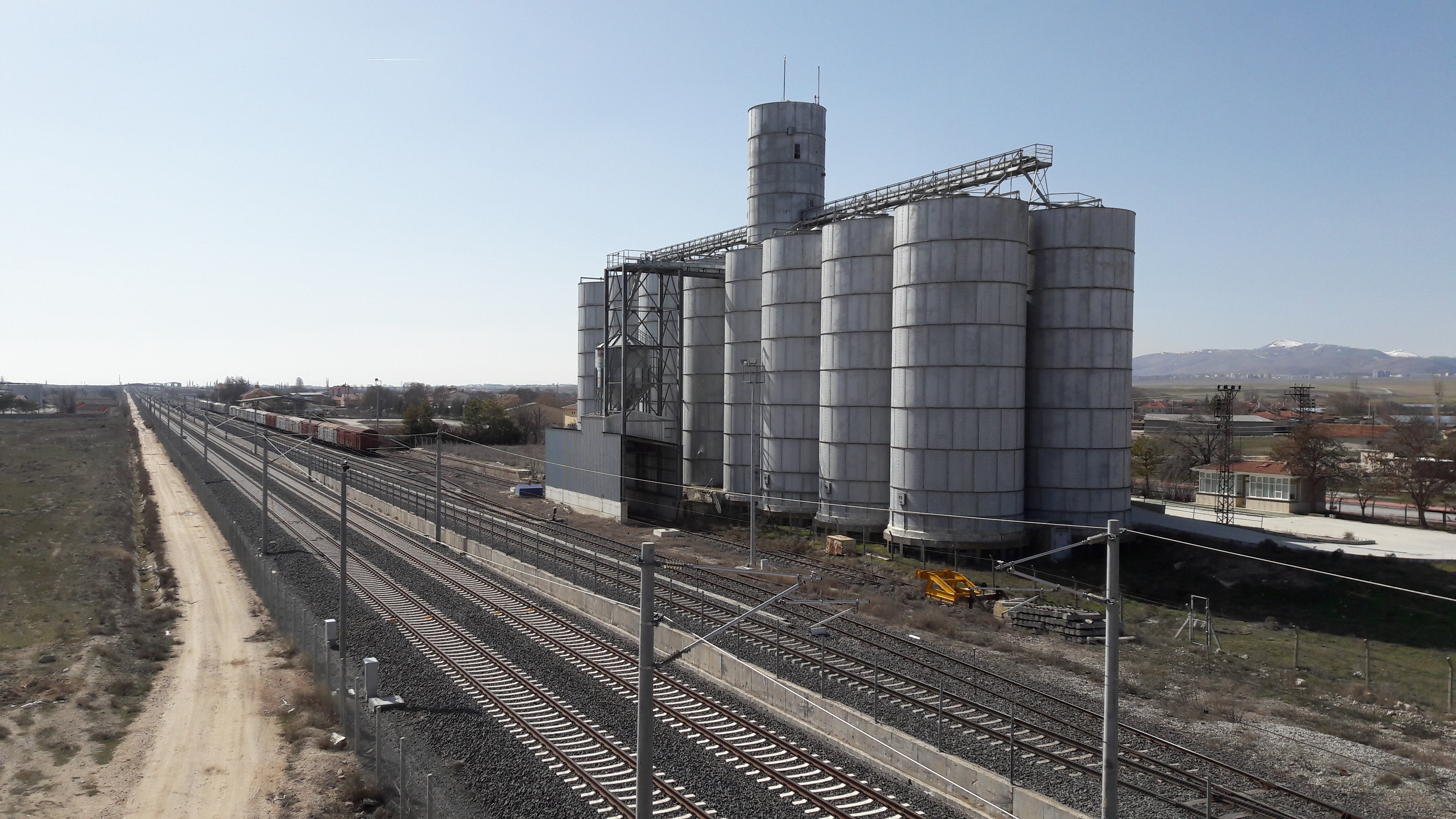
- The grain elevators with the station itself visible in the background.

General information
- Location: 16706 Sk., 03700; Aşağıpınarbaşı, Konya; Turkey
- Coordinates: 38.0364°N 32.6042°E
- System: TCDD Taşımacılık intercity rail station
- Owner: Turkish State Railways
- Operator: TCDD Taşımacılık
- Line: Konya Blue Train
- Platforms: 1 side platform
- Tracks: 1

Construction
- Parking: No
- Cycle facilities: No
- Accessible: No

Services
Preceding station	TCDD Taşımacılık	Following station
Meydan towards İzmir (Basmane)	Konya Blue Train	Konya Terminus
Location

Pınarbaşı railway station (Turkish: Pınarbaşı istasyonu) is a railway station in Aşağıpınarbaşı, Turkey. TCDD Taşımacılık operates a daily inter-city train from İzmir to Konya which stops at the station in the evening and in the early morning.

The Polatlı-Konya high-speed railway bypasses the station but does not stop there. Trains that stop at Pınarbaşı are all on the Eskişehir-Konya railway.
