= Varda Viaduct =

Railroad bridge in Turkey

Varda Viaduct Varda Köprüsü
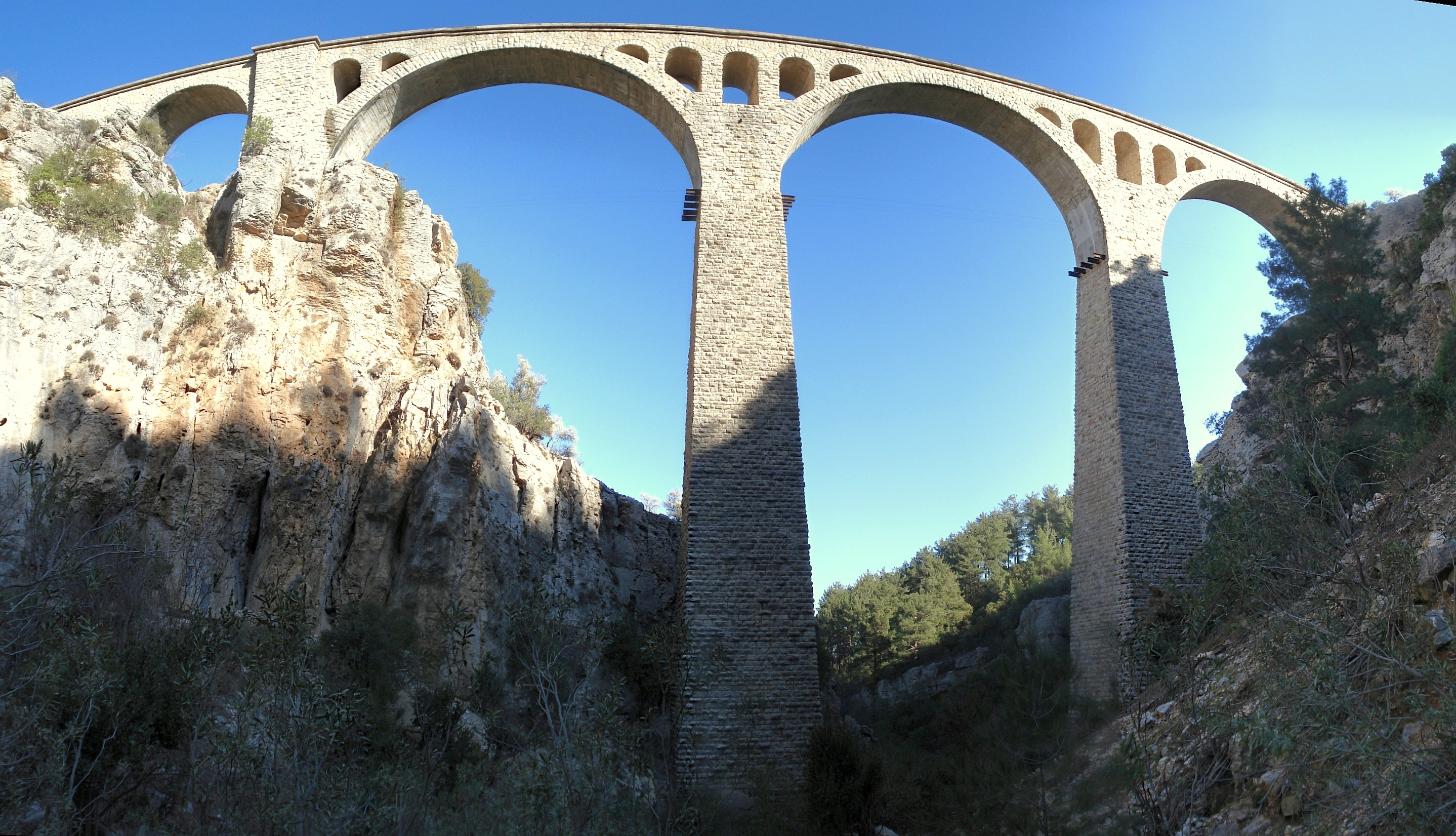
- Varda Viaduct seen from northwest.
- Coordinates: 37.24300°N 34.97684°E
- Carries: 1 track of the Konya-Yenice railway
- Crosses: Çakıt Deresi (formerly: Giaour Dere)
- Locale: Hacıkırı-Karaisalı, Adana Province, Turkey
- Other name(s): Giaour Dere Viaduct
- Owner: Turkish State Railways (TCDD)

Characteristics
- Material: Natural stone
- Total length: 172 m (564 ft)
- Height: 98 m (322 ft)
- No. of spans: 11

History
- Engineering design by: Philipp Holzmann & Cie, German Empire
- Construction start: 1905
- Construction end: 1916; 109 years ago
- Inaugurated: 9 October 1918

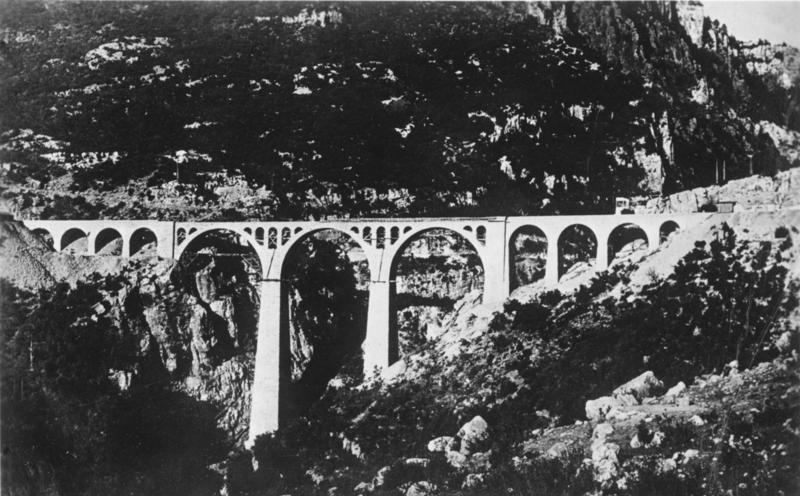
Varda Bridge during the construction time, seen from southeast.

The Varda Viaduct (Turkish: Varda Köprüsü), aka Giaour Dere Viaduct, locally known as "Alman Köprüsü" or "Koca Köprü" (literally: German Viaduct or Big Viaduct), is a railway viaduct situated at Hacıkırı (Kıralan) village in Karaisalı district of Adana Province in southern Turkey. Designed and built by Imperial German engineers as part of the Baghdad Railway (Haydarpaşa Terminal, Istanbul-Baghdad), the stone arch structure is 63 km (39 mi) from Adana Central Station and 306 km (190 mi) from Konya.

== Design and construction ==
The building of the viaduct was coupled with the construction of the Ottoman-German project of Istanbul-Baghdad railway line to connect Berlin with Basra, then part of the Ottoman Empire, to enable direct supply of oil to German industry.

The most difficult terrain on the route to overcome was the section at the Taurus Mountains between Konya and Adana, more specifically around the region of Belemedik, where in a distance of 12 km (7.5 mi) 22 tunnels in a row had to be dug in 20 years.

Financed by the German Deutsche Bank, the construction of the viaduct was commissioned to Philipp Holzmann & Cie, a renowned German construction company with experience in the field of major infrastructure works. The design and engineering work was carried out by the German Winkler and the Greek-Ottoman Nicholas Mavrogordato, who became responsible chief engineer after the death of Winkler. In 1903, the construction work force, consisting of German technical staff and thousands of multi-national workers, settled in a camp newly established in Belemedik, where all necessary facilities such as hospital, church, school, movie theatre and even mosque were built.

The railway line had to cross the deep canyon of a creek called then Giaour Dere (today "Çakıt Deresi") that is situated between Hacıkırı village and Karaisalı town. Main materials such as steel and cement were shipped to Mersin by sea, and transported further via Tarsus to the construction site on camelback. Before the construction of the actual viaduct began, a temporary viaduct with a narrow gauge railway on it was built over the canyon close to the projected viaduct to bring all the necessary material to the other side. Following the completion of the Varda Viaduct, the auxiliary viaduct was taken out of service, however, its pillars are still existing.

The construction began in 1905, and in 1907, the main works were completed. Technical details were accomplished in 1912. The railway on the viaduct went into service in 1916.

The 172-metre (564 ft) long and 98-metre (322 ft) high structure consists of eleven ashlar arch spans in total. The central portion has three 30-metre (98 ft) arches, with spandrel arches over the piers, and is flanked on each side by four arch spans, at one side one of 6 m (20 ft), three of 12 m (39 ft) and at the other side four of 10 m (33 ft). After erecting the masonry pillars, the arches were built over a temporary falsework steel frame, which was placed on the pillars. The viaduct, which spans in north–south direction, is curved having a radius of curvature of 1,200 m (3,900 ft).

The first Ottoman high official to pass over the Varda Viaduct was Minister of War Enver Pasha on February 18, 1917. Shortly before the end of World War I, the bridge was used by retreating German troops.

== Location and access ==
The railway stations at opposite ends of the viaduct, Hacıkırı and Karaisalı Bucağı, are still being served today by the "Central Anatolian Blue train" (Turkish: İç Anadolu Mavi treni). The nearest railway station to the viaduct is Hacıkırı, which is at a distance of about 500 m (1,640 ft).

== In popular media ==
The Varda Viaduct was featured in the opening chase scene in the James Bond film Skyfall, released in October 2012.

The viaduct was featured in the Turkish film Küf (Mold) directed by Ali Aydin, released November 2013.
