= Konya–Yenice railway =

Railway line in Turkey

Konya–Yenice
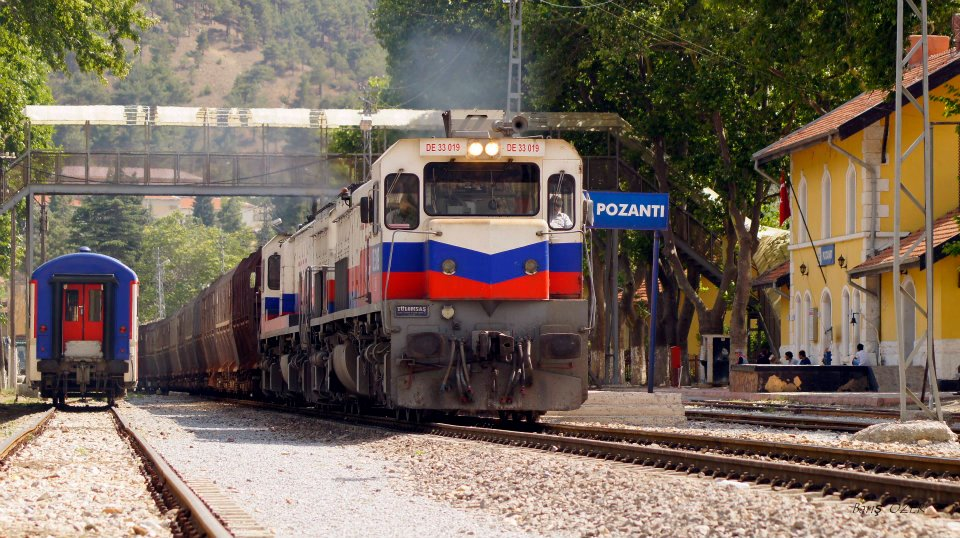
- A freight train passing through Pozantı.

Overview
- Owner: Turkish State Railways
- Locale: Konya Plain; Taurus Mountains; Çukurova
- Termini: Konya; Yenice

Service
- Type: Heavy rail, Higher-speed rail
- System: Turkish State Railways
- Operator(s): TCDD Taşımacılık; Körfez Ulaştırma; Omsan

History
- Opened: 25 October 1904 (first section); 9 October 1918 (final section)

Technical
- Line length: 344.7 km (214.2 mi)
- Number of tracks: 2 (Konya-Karaman); 1 (Karaman-Yenice)
- Track gauge: 1,435 mm (4 ft 8 1/2 in) standard gauge
- Electrification: 25 kV, 50 Hz AC overhead line
- Operating speed: 200 km (120 mi) (Konya-Karaman); 120 km (75 mi) (Karaman-Ulukışla); 100 km (62 mi) (Ulukışla-Yenice)

The Konya–Yenice railway (Turkish: Konya-Yenice demiryolu) is a 344.7 km (214.2 mi) long, partially electrified railway in southern Turkey. The railway is a major route connecting Turkey's Mediterranean coast to the Anatolian interior as well as the only railway line through the Taurus Mountains. The line begins in Konya and runs southeast through Karaman until turning south at Ulukışla and joining the Adana–Mersin railway at Yenice. The section between Konya and Karaman is classified as a High-standard railway (Turkish: Yüksek standartlı demiryolu), while the rest of the route is classified as a Conventional railway (Turkish: Konvansiyonel demiryolu).

The Konya–Yenice railway was built by the Baghdad Railway mainly between 1904 and 1912, with the final 36 km (22 mi) gap completed in 1918. It served an important role during World War I in transporting troops and materiel to the fronts in Mesopotamia and Palestine. Numerous engineering works were undertaken to build through the steep Taurus Mountains, the most famous of them being the Varda Viaduct.

The first section of the route, between Konya and Karaman, is an electrified, double track, higher-speed railway which hosts YHT high-speed train service. This 106 km (66 mi) long section of the railway allows for speeds up to 200 km/h (120 mph), making it the fastest conventional railway in Turkey, excluding dedicated high-speed rail lines. Plans to upgrade the entire railway are underway with the second section between Karaman and Ulukışla under construction. These upgrades will include electrification, ECTS signalling, adding a second track and upgrading the right-of-way to allow for speeds up to 200 km/h (120 mph). Plans for the third section of the project, between Ulukışla and Yenice, have been finalized and the tender has been awarded in August 2021.

== Operations ==
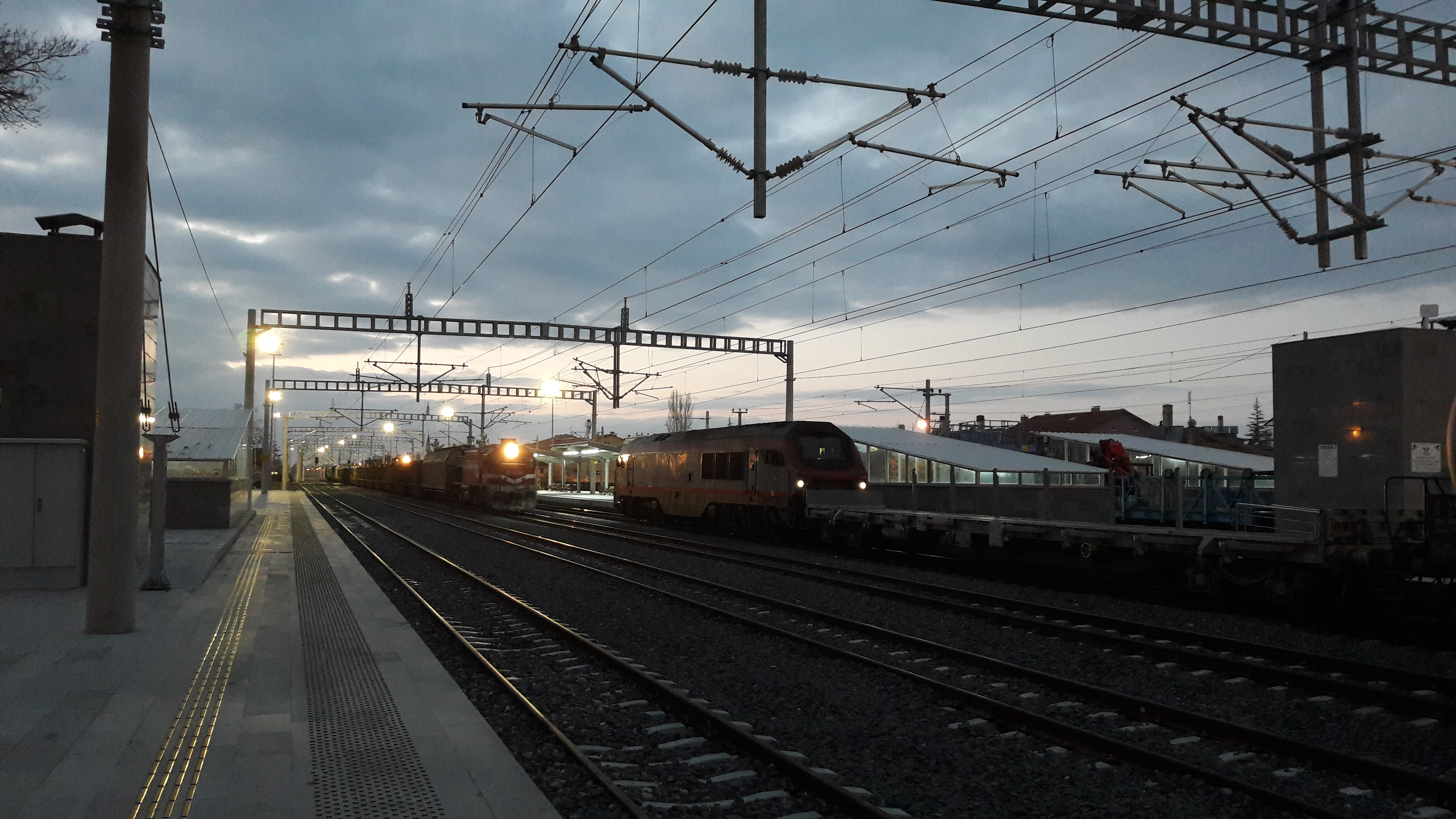
Two freight trains meet at Çumra along the upgraded section of the railway.

The Konya–Yenice railway hosts both passenger and freight rail, from three different operators. TCDD Taşımacılık (TCDDT) operates high-speed passenger service on the line mostly between Konya and Karaman. However a daily intercity train from Kayseri to Adana uses the line to traverse the Taurus Mountains. A daily intercity train between Konya and Adana also used the line, until 12 March 2020, when service was suspended due to the COVID-19 pandemic. The route is primarily for freight rail as the bulk of trains TCDDT runs on it are freight trains. Two private operators also run freight trains on the railway. Körfez Ulaştırma (KUAŞ) operates freight trains carrying liquid fuel from Kırıkkale to Mersin, while Omsan operates freight trains carrying bulk from Aliağa and Payas to Kayseri.

Train type	Route	Frequency	Operator
High-speed	Konya – Karaman	3x Daily	TCDD Taşımacılık
Regional	Konya – Karaman	4x Daily	TCDD Taşımacılık
Mainline	Konya – Karaman – Ereğli – Ulukışla – Pozantı – Yenice – Adana	Daily	TCDD Taşımacılık
Mainline	Kayseri – Niğde – Ulukışla – Pozantı – Yenice – Adana	Daily	TCDD Taşımacılık

== History ==
The Konya-Yenice railway was originally built as the northernmost section of the Baghdad Railway, running from Konya to Baghdad. Constructed by the Baghdad Railway Company, the line aimed to connect Istanbul to Baghdad and Mesopotamia, which were provinces of the Ottoman Empire at the time. Construction began on 27 July 1903 from Konya and the first section was opened to Bulgurluk on 25 October 1904. This 201 km (125 mi) section ran across the relatively flat Konya Plain, allowing construction to progress smoothly. However the railway was not able to secure financing for the second section of the project from Bulgurluk to Nusaybin until 2 July 1908. Following a further delay by the Young Turk Revolution, construction of the railway continued in December 1909, opening to Ulukışla on 1 July 1911. With the Baghdad Railway Company's acquisition of the Mersin-Tarsus-Adana Railway in 1906, they had a junction built at Yenice, where the line from Konya would connect to. The most challenging section of the railway, through the Taurus Mountains, was constructed in the two parts: southward from Ulukışla in the north and northward from Yenice in the south. The railway reached Durak, from Yenice in the south, opening on 27 April 1912 and reached Belemedik from Ulukışla in north, opening on 21 December. The final 36.8 km (22.9 mi) section between Belemedik and Durak proved to be the most challenging. While most of the line was completed by the outbreak of World War I, in 1914, several tunnels were still under construction. The railway played a very important role in transporting Ottoman and German troops to the Middle-East putting immense pressure on the completion of the tunnels. The Ottoman government accelerated construction works in 1917 and the railway was finally opened on 9 October 1918, 21 days before the Ottomans signed the Armistice of Mudros.

Following the defeat of the Ottomans in the war, the Baghdad Railway Company was dissolved and the Konya-Yenice railway was placed under British military control. In 1919, the French military took over operations of the southern section of the railway, with the two countries delineating their sections at Pozantı. Following the British withdrawal from central Anatolia, the railway north of Pozantı fell under the control of the Turkish nationalist forces. The southern section of the railway was abandoned by the French due to the very poor condition of the railway. Following the Turkish victory in the Franco-Turkish War, an agreement was signed between the Ankara government and France, splitting the ownership of the railway in two. Similar to the previous Franco-British arrangement, the split would be at Pozantı and the northern 281 km (175 mi) section of the line would be taken over by the Ankara government, while the southern 63 km (39 mi) section would be taken over by the Cilicia and North Syria Railway (CNS), a French company, along with the rest of Baghdad Railway from Pozantı to Nusaybin. However the CNS never operated the Yenice-Pozantı section of the railway and in 1924 it was taken over by the Anatolian Baghdad Railways (CFAB), the first national railway company of Turkey. Ownership changed again, in 1927, when the CFAB was merged into the State Railways and Seaports Administration (DDYL) and again, in 1929, when the DDYL was absorbed by the State Railway Administration (DDY), which later become the Turkish State Railways (TCDD).

The Konya-Yenice railway continued to play a very important role in the early years of the Republic. Until 1936, the railway was the only connection between Turkey's western railways and its south-eastern railways. The Turkish government began a railway building spree in the late 1920s. A new railway from Kayseri was opened in 1933, connecting to the Konya-Yenice line just north of Ulukıșla. This allowed an alternate route to Ankara, reducing congestion through Konya, but the route through the Taurus Mountains remained the only way to access Turkey's southern seaports. An alternate connection to the east was finally opened in 1936. On 15 February 1930, the Taurus Express made its maiden journey from Haydarpaşa station in Istanbul to Baghdad, via Konya. This train, operated by Compagnie Internationale des Wagons-Lits (CIWL), was a luxury train and the Anatolian counterpart to the Orient Express.

Following the construction of the Polatlı-Konya high-speed railway in 2011, plans to double-track and upgrade Konya-Yenice railway to host high-speed trains was put into motion. Construction began on 12 March 2014 with a groundbreaking ceremony in Karaman. The first phase of the project was the upgrade of the railway between Konya and Karaman (102 km (63 mi)), which was completed in 2021 and opened on 8 January 2022. The second phase of the upgrade, from Karaman to Ulukışla, began in 2016 but most construction stalled until 2019. The original completion date of Phase II was July 2022, but has been pushed back to 2023. Once phase II is complete, phase III will begin through the Taurus Mountains. The entire project is a part of the Konya-Adana high-speed rail corridor, which in turn with the Mersin-Adana-Gaziantep high-speed rail corridor, will connect Istanbul and Ankara in the north with Adana, Mersin and Gaziantep in the south.
