= Philipp Holzmann =

Former German building company

Philipp Holzmann AG
- Industry: Construction
- Predecessor: Held & Francke Bauaktiengesellschaft
- Founded: 1849
- Defunct: 2002
- Fate: Liquidation
- Headquarters: Frankfurt am Main, Germany
- Key people: Johann Philipp Holzmann, founder
- Website: philipp-holzmann.de

Philipp Holzmann AG was a German construction company based in Frankfurt am Main.

== History ==
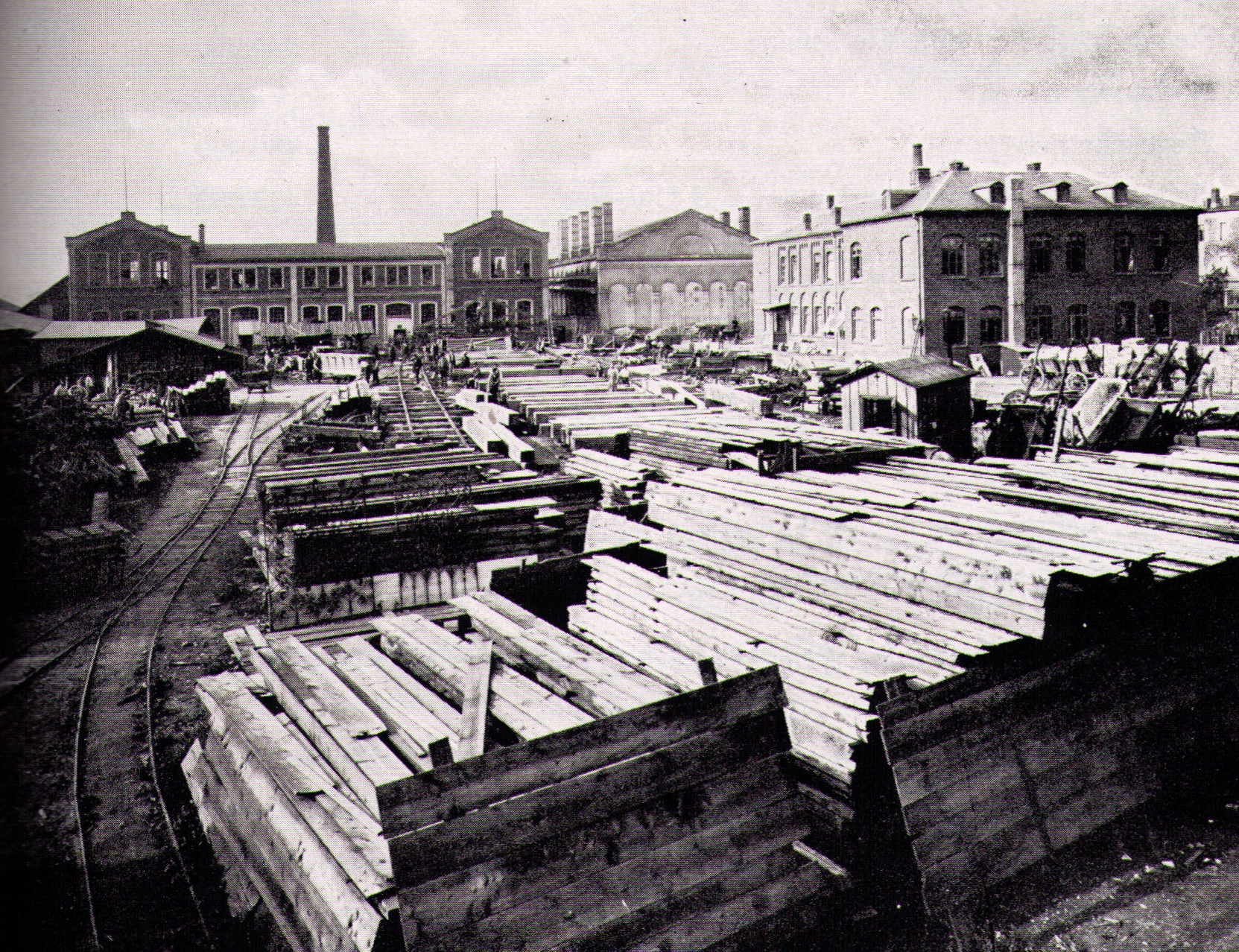
Philipp Holzmann warehouse in Frankfurt am Main in 1875

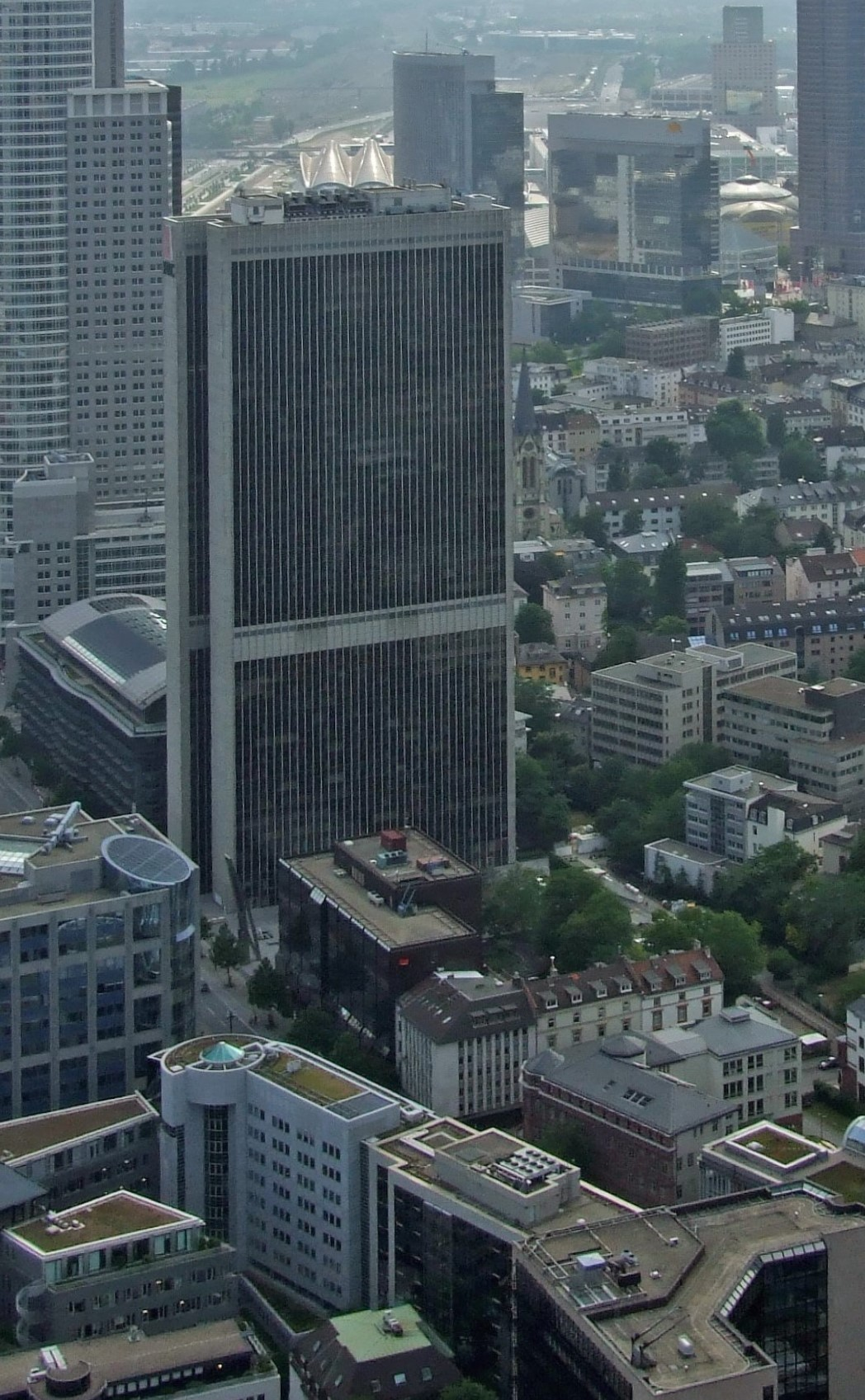
The Frankfurter Büro Center which was built by Philipp Holzmann

=== Early years ===
The company was founded in 1849 by Johann Philipp Holzmann (1805-1870) at Sprendlingen in present-day Dreieich near Frankfurt am Main as Philipp Holzmann & Cie.

The first large building contract to be finished was the opera house completed in 1880, followed by the central station in Frankfurt am Main completed in 1888 and the Amsterdam Centraal railway station in 1889. Holzmann also built the original Reichstag building completed in 1894, the Hamburg city hall completed in 1897 and several railway projects in East Africa and Asia, especially the Bagdadbahn built from 1903 which incorporates the Istanbul Haydarpaşa railway station finished in 1908, as well as the Varda Viaduct at Taurus Mountains in southern Turkey completed in 1916. Furthermore, the company participated in the construction of the Elbe Tunnel of 1911 and the Hindenburgdamm completed in 1927, and also the modernist Riederwald housing estate in Frankfurt.

In 1917, Philipp Holzmann & Cie merged with the Internationale Baugesellschaft and became the publicly traded Philipp Holzmann Aktiengesellschaft. In 1938, the company had 20,800 employees and contributed to several major building projects like the new Reich Chancellery in Berlin, the Nazi party rally grounds in Nürnberg, the Prora complex as well as the Westwall and numerous sections of the Reichsautobahn. During World War II, Holzmann constructed large parts of the Atlantic Wall by order of the Organisation Todt.

=== Post-war years ===
In the post-war period, the company soon recovered with the rebuilding of Frankfurt, the airport and several public infrastructure projects. Post-war projects included the General Rafael Urdaneta Bridge in Venezuela completed in 1962, the AfE-Turm in Frankfurt completed in 1972, the Westend Gate in Frankfurt completed in 1976, the Eurotower in Frankfurt completed in 1977 and the Silberturm in Frankfurt completed in 1978. These projects enabled Holzmann to expand into the United States and in 1979 it acquired J.A. Jones Construction, a major US contractor.

More recent major projects involving Holzmann included the Frankfurter Büro Center in Frankfurt completed in 1980, the Eurotheum in Frankfurt completed in 1999, the Main Tower in Frankfurt completed in 2000, the Trianon in Frankfurt completed in 2003 and the Western Scheldt Tunnel in the Netherlands also completed in 2003. The company was also involved in several prestigious projects overseas, including in Saudi Arabia, Abu Dhabi, Algeria, Oman, and Libya; in the Middle East alone, Holzmann executed projects with a combined value in excess of $10 billion. Some projects taken on by Holzmann, such as the Birecik Dam in Turkey, were performed under the build–operate–transfer (BOT) project delivery method.

In September 1992, Holzmann purchased the German contractor Intech from the privatisation agency Treuhandanstalt. In November 1994, the construction services company Hochtief launched an unsolicited bid to acquire Holzmann, which would have resulted in the largest construction company in Europe if successful; in January 1995, the transaction was rejected by German authorities and thus blocked from proceeding.

In 1996, Holzmann's management board was ousted and Heinrich Binder was installed as its chief executive.

=== Decline and collapse ===
During the late 1990s, the company proved to have become overexposed to the volatile real estate sectors of both France and Spain; underperformance here generated substantial financial turmoil, effectively wiping out the company's capital and forcing it to the brink of insolvency in late 1999. It was speculated that the company would be seeking either a buyer or a major international partner in the near future, although this was denied by its management team. In November 2000, a rescue effort for Holzmann that involved Germany's head of state, chancellor Gerhard Schröder, was launched, leading to short term relief being issued by several of its creditors; the company received a 1.2 billion DM capital increase into the firm in February 2000, as well as a further 700 million DM in convertible participation rights one month later. Numerous employees also agreed to forego overtime pay.

As part of the efforts to save Holzmann, a new management team was appointed and a radical restructuring effort was initiated; by April 2000, Holzmann had entirely removed itself from both France and Spain while 23 of its 40 regional units in Germany were set to be permanently shuttered, comprising a 49 percent of the company's workforce. Efforts were made to reorient towards Holzmann's core business of general and industrial construction, infrastructure, and services. To this end, its sales and marketing team was expanded and efforts were made to secure new projects in the Middle East. However, the wider construction sector experienced a severe slump during the early 2000s, souring its prospects. In its financial results for 2021, Holzmann carried debts totalling €1.6 billion and incurred a €237 million loss, which was reportedly three times great than had been forecast.

On 21 March 2002, shortly after the failure of talks with its creditors, Holzmann announced that it was filing for bankruptcy, resulting in the loss of 23,000 jobs and becoming the biggest corporate failure in German history. Ottmar Hermann was appointed as the insolvency administrator and oversaw the liquidation of the company, during which various assets and subsidiaries formerly belonging to Holzmann were either sold off or dissolved.
