= Southern Railway (Turkey) =

Cenup Demiryolları
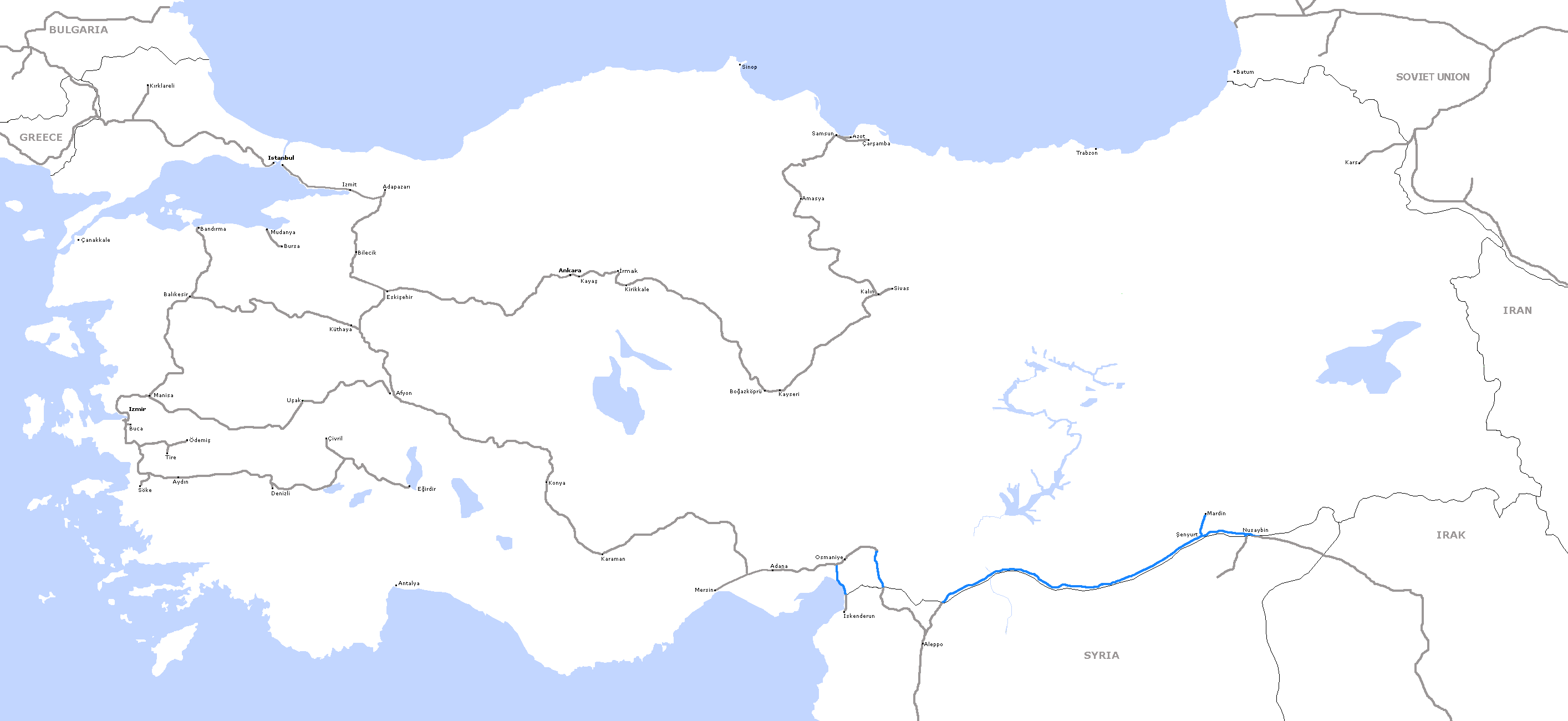
- Cenup Demiryolları in blue.

Overview
- Headquarters: Nusaybin, Turkey
- Reporting mark: CD
- Locale: Cilicia
- Dates of operation: 1933–1948
- Successor: TCDD

Technical
- Track gauge: 4 ft 8 1/2 in (1,435 mm) standard gauge

The Cenup Demiryolları (French: Chemins de fer du Sud de la Turquie, English: Southern Railways) was the name of the railway operating former Baghdad Railway trackage in Turkey from 1933 to 1948. Cenup is another word for south in Turkish.

== History ==
The Chemins de fer de Cilicie Nord-Syrie (CNS), one of the two successors to the Baghdad Railway, operated lines in the newly formed Turkish Republic. The CNS was a French owned company that operated mainly in Syria. In 1927 the CNS was renamed Bozanti-Alep-Nissibine et Prolongements (BANP). The Turkish government and the BANP signed an agreement in Ankara on October 27, 1932. The agreement was that routes of the BANP in the Turkish borders would be sold to a Turkish company. Cenup Demiryolları or the Southern Railways was formed on April 27, 1933. The BANP was taken over by the Damas, Hamah et Prolongements (DHP) the same year. In 1937 TCDD took over the Toprakkale-Payas and Fevzipaşa-Meydiankebez lines. The CD then operated only from Al-Rai to Nusaybin. TCDD absorbed the CD completely in 1948.
