= Konya Metro =

Metro system in Konya, Turkey

Overview
- Locale: Konya, Turkey
- Transit type: Rapid transit
- Number of lines: 1 (under construction)
- Number of stations: 22 (under construction)

Operation
- Operation will start: TBD

Technical
- System length: 21.1 km (13.1 mi)
- Track gauge: 1,435 mm (4 ft 8 1/2 in) (standard gauge)

The Konya Metro is an under construction rapid transit system for the Turkish city of Konya. Construction of the Metro began in May 2020. The Metro will have 1 line with 22 stations.

== Background ==
Plans for a metro system in Konya were first discussed in 2015, with a feasibility study completed the following year. Planners and city leaders in Konya have stated that traffic will be seriously affected by the construction of the Konya Metro. Konya's Municipal Government has stated that they are trying to minimize this problem by opening new and widening existing roads. In order to ease the traffic due to the metro construction, Celaleddin Karatay Street will be added to Karatay district and İsmail Ketenci Street to Meram district. Once completed, the Metro is expected to reduce traffic congestion on city streets.

Financing for the project is being provided by the Ministry of Transport and Infrastructure (Turkey).

== Construction ==
In November 2019 the mayor of Konya announced that a consortium of China National Machinery and Taşyapı, will implement the €1.19bn project. The first line will be 21 km (13.0 mi) in length with 22 stations, and is due to be completed by the end of 2025. A formal groundbreaking was held on May 4, 2020. The system will be constructed entirely using a tunneling method and the length of it will run underground.

== See also ==
- Rail transport in Turkey
- KonyaRay
