= Konya railway station =

Railway station in Konya, Turkey

Konya
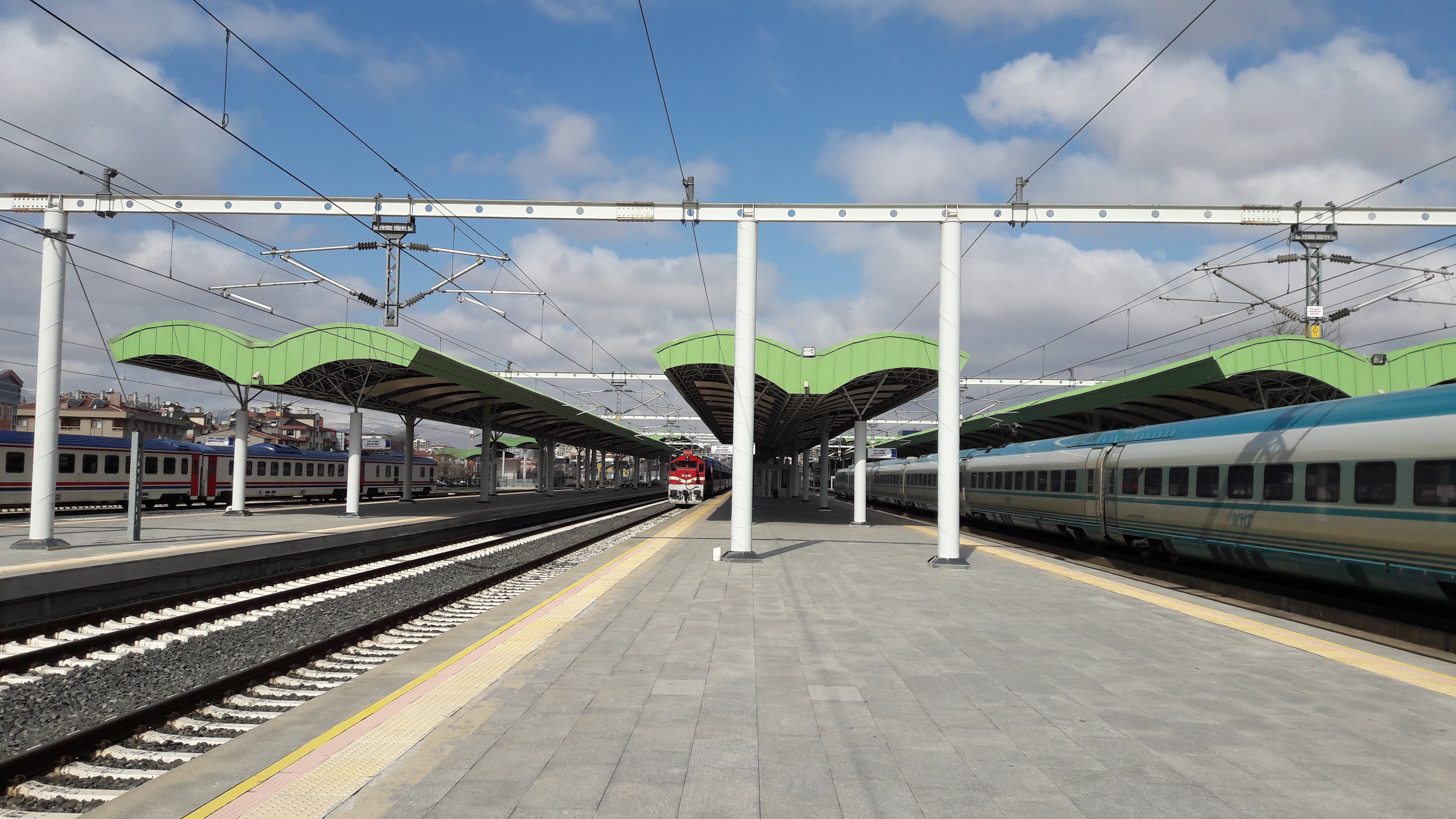
- A high-speed train and express train waiting to depart the station.

General information
- Location: Mamuriye Mh., Alay Cd., 42040 Meram/Konya; Turkey
- Coordinates: 37.866333°N 32.476361°E
- System: TCDD Taşımacılık high-speed, intercity and regional rail station
- Owner: Turkish State Railways
- Operator: TCDD Taşımacılık
- Lines: Eskişehir-Konya railway Konya-Yenice railway Polatlı-Konya high-speed railway
- Platforms: 3 (2 island platforms, 1 side platform)
- Tracks: 5

Construction
- Structure type: At-grade
- Parking: Yes
- Accessible: Yes

History
- Opened: 29 July 1896
- Rebuilt: 2011
- Electrified: 2011 (25 kV AC)

Services
Preceding station	TCDD Taşımacılık	Following station
Selçuklu YHT towards Ankara	Yüksek Hızlı Tren	Çumra towards Karaman
Selçuklu YHT towards Istanbul Halkalı	Yüksek Hızlı Tren	Çumra towards Karaman
Pınarbaşı towards İzmir (Basmane)	Konya Blue Train	Terminus
Terminus	Taurus Express	Kaşınhan towards Adana
Terminus	Konya–Karaman	Kaşınhan towards Karaman
Location

Konya station (Turkish: Konya garı) is an inter-city railway station serving the central anatolian city of Konya. It serves as the southern terminus of the Polatlı–Konya high-speed railway with YHT high-speed trains from Ankara and Istanbul servicing the station. Inter-city trains to İzmir and Adana also terminate at the station. In 2011, the station was expanded, modernized and electrified to accommodate the new YHT high-speed rail service.

The train station will have an operational Konya Metro station in 2025.

== Pictures ==
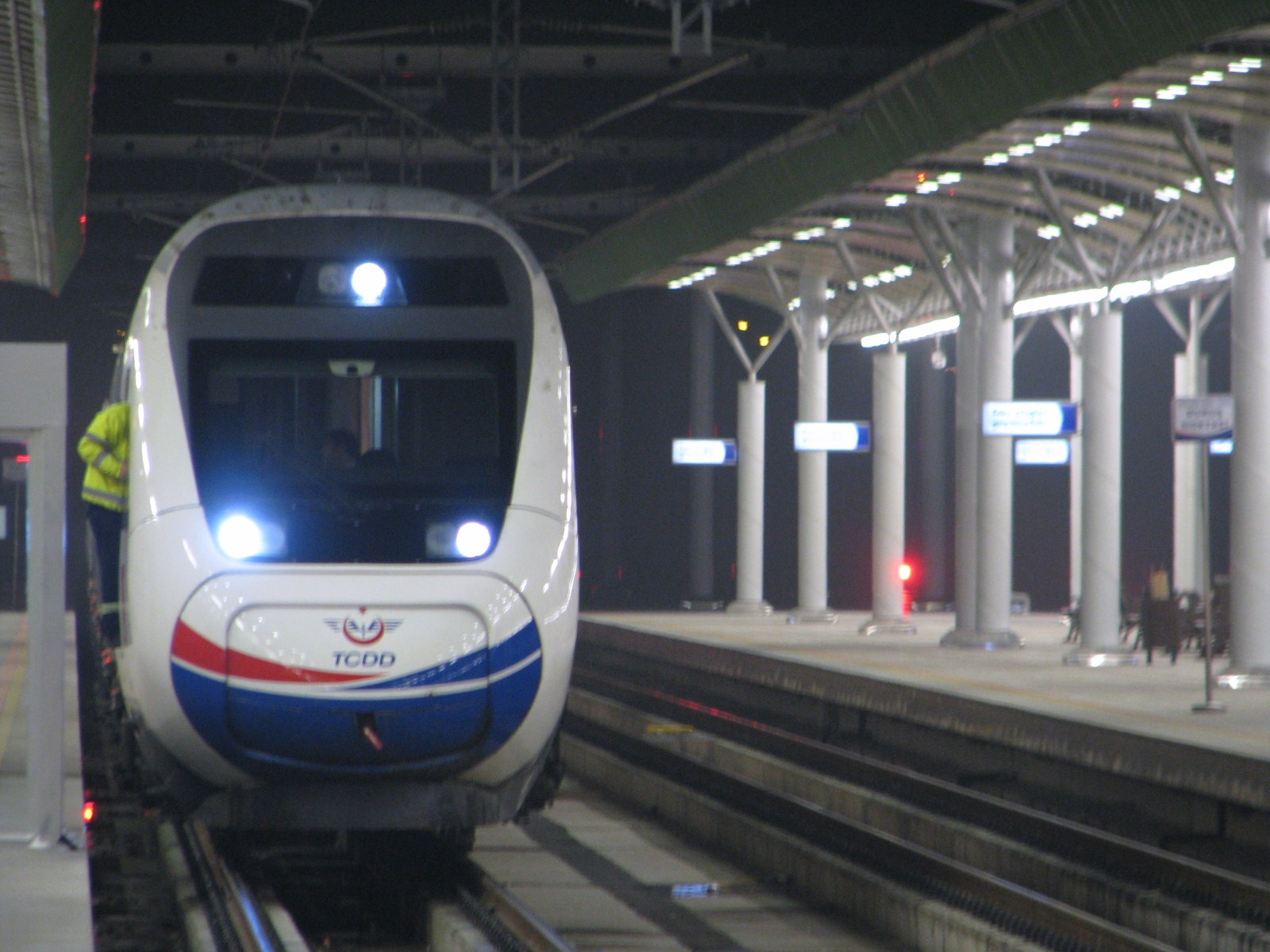
A high-speed train at the station
