= Eastern Railway (Turkey) =

Overview
- Headquarters: Erzurum, Turkey
- Reporting mark: ŞDİ
- Locale: Turkey
- Dates of operation: 1925–1927
- Predecessor: Transcaucasus Railway
- Successor: State Railways and Seaports Administration

Technical
- Track gauge: 1,520 mm (4 ft 11 27/32 in) Broad gauge (Sarıkamış-Hudut); 750 mm (2 ft 5 1/2 in) Narrow gauge (Sarıkamış-Erzurum)
- Length: 361 kilometres (224 mi)

The Eastern Railway (Turkish: Havali-yi Şarkiye Demiryolları İdaresi) was a 361 km (224 mi) long railway line operating in northern Turkey from 1925 to 1927. Along with the Anatolian—Baghdad Railways and the Railway Construction and Management Administration, the Eastern Railway was one of the three railways that merged in 1927, to form the State Railways and Seaports Administration, the direct predecessor to the Turkish State Railways.

The railway was founded in 1925 by the Turkish government and headquartered in Erzurum. The purpose of the railway was to take over ownership and operations of the Transcaucasus Railway within Turkey.
