= Karaman railway station =

Railway station in Karaman, Turkey

Karaman
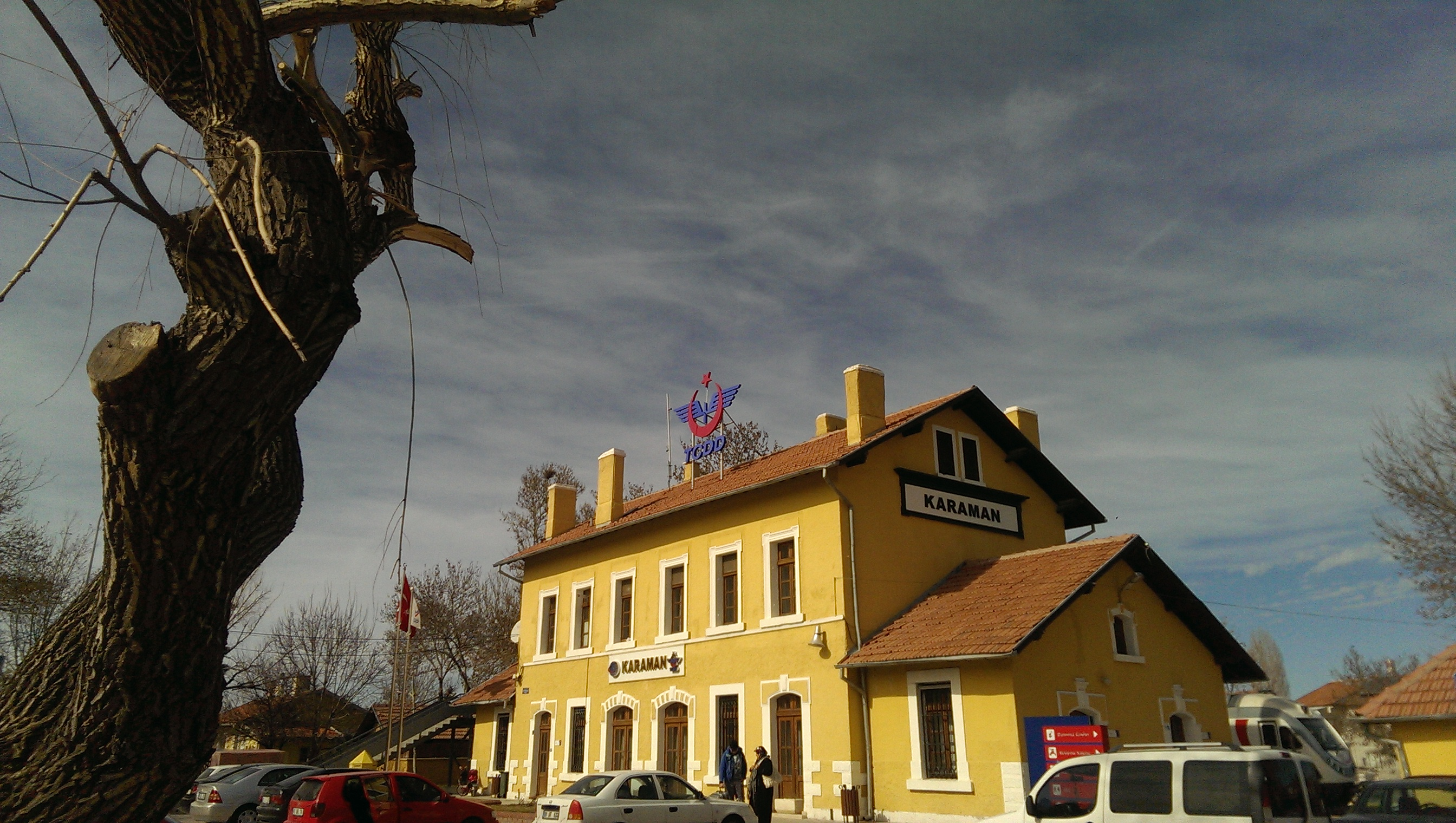
- The station building.

General information
- Location: Atatürk Cd. 1-3, Nefise Sultan Mah., 70100 Karaman Merkez/Karaman; Turkey
- Coordinates: 37.193453°N 33.215649°E
- System: TCDD high-speed and intercity station
- Owner: Turkish State Railways
- Line: Konya-Yenice railway
- Platforms: 1 side platform, 1 island platform
- Tracks: 3

Construction
- Structure type: At-grade
- Parking: Yes

History
- Opened: 25 October 1904

Services
Preceding station	TCDD Taşımacılık	Following station
Çumra towards Ankara	Yüksek Hızlı Tren	Terminus
Çumra towards Istanbul Halkalı	Yüksek Hızlı Tren	Terminus
Arıkören towards Konya	Taurus Express	Sudurağı towards Adana
Arıkören towards Konya	Konya–Karaman	Terminus
Location

Karaman railway station is a station in Karaman, Turkey. Situated in the northern part of the city, it is served by the Taurus Express and the Konya-Karaman Regional, which totals to three daily trains, in each direction. Karaman station also part of the Polatlı-Konya high-speed railway extension, which opened in 2021.

Until the high-speed railway extension is complete, TCDD Taşımacılık operates two daily regional trains that serves as a connection to high-speed trains in Konya.

Karaman station is 102.2 km (63.5 mi) southeast of Konya station and 267.7 km (166.3 mi) northwest of Adana station.
