= State Railways and Seaports Administration =

Overview
- Headquarters: Ankara, Turkey
- Reporting mark: DDYL
- Locale: Turkey
- Dates of operation: 1927–1929
- Predecessor: CFAB, ŞDİ, Dİİ
- Successor: State Railways Administration

Technical
- Track gauge: 1,435 mm (4 ft 8 1/2 in) 1,520 mm (4 ft 11 27/32 in) (Sarıkamış-Gyumri); 750 mm (2 ft 5 1/2 in) (Sarıkamış-Erzurum)
- Length: 1,730 kilometres (1,075 mi)

The State Railways and Seaports Administration (Turkish: Devlet Demiryolları ve Limanları İdare-i Umumiyesi) or DDYL was a state-owned railway company formed in 1927 by the merger of three state-owned railways: the Anatolian Baghdad Railways, Eastern Railway and the Railway Construction and Management Administration. The DDL is the direct predecessor to the Turkish State Railways.

The DDYL inherited 1,730 km (1,070 mi) of railway lines from its three predecessors and at the same time, the railway was responsible for the construction of new lines, the most important one being the extension of the railway from Kayseri to Sivas. On 4 June 1929, the Turkish government formed the State Railways Administration (Turkish: Devlet Demiryolları Umum Müdürlüğü, DDY) which absorbed the State Railways and Seaports Administration.
