= Anatolian Baghdad Railways =

Chemins de fer d'Anatolie Baghdad
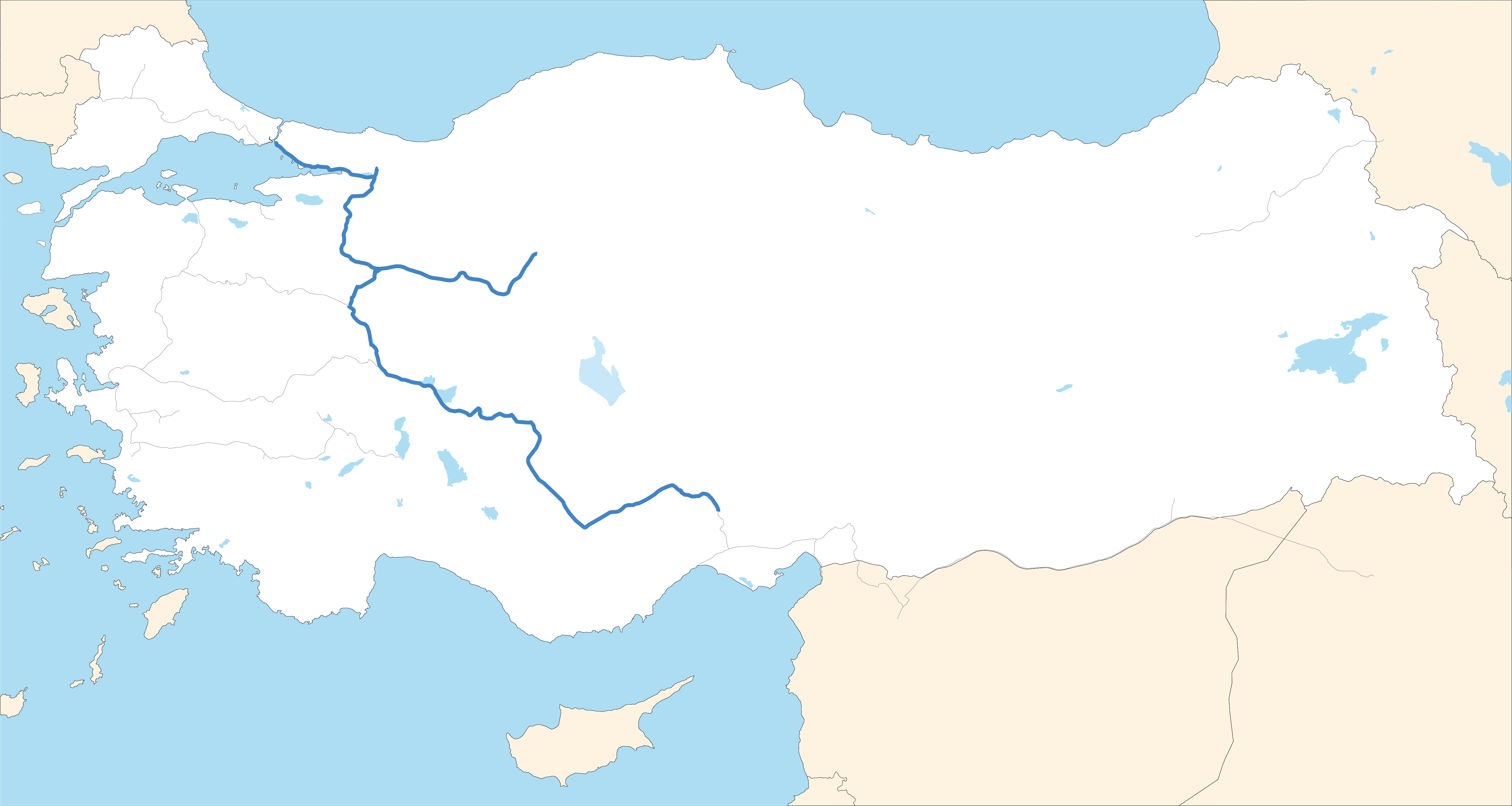
- The CFAB in 1927 (other railways in gray)

Overview
- Headquarters: Ankara, Turkey
- Reporting mark: CFAB
- Locale: Eastern Marmara, Central Anatolia
- Dates of operation: 1924–1927
- Predecessor: CFOA, CIOB
- Successor: DDYL

Technical
- Track gauge: 1,435 mm (4 ft 8 1/2 in)
- Length: 1,067 km (663 mi)

The Chemins de fer d'Anatolie Baghdad (Turkish: Anadolu-Bağdat Demiryolları Müdüriyet-i Umumiyesi, English: Anatolian Baghdad Railway) was the first national railway company of the Republic of Turkey. It was formed on 3 March 1924 by the Turkish Government to operate and later buy up stocks of the Ottoman Anatolian Railway as well as the Konya-Pozantı section of the former Baghdad Railway. In 1927, the CFAB merged with the Eastern Railway and the Railway Construction and Management Administration to form the State Railways and Seaports Administration, which is the direct predecessor of the Turkish State Railways.

== See also ==
- Chemins de Fer Ottomans d'Anatolie
