= Konya-Karaman Regional =

Regional rail in Turkey

Overview
- Service type: Regional rail
- Status: Operating
- Locale: Konya Province and Karaman Province
- First service: 23 August 2011
- Current operator: TCDD Taşımacılık
- Former operator: Turkish State Railways

Route
- Termini: Konya station, Konya; Karaman station, Karaman
- Stops: 5
- Distance travelled: 102 km (63 mi)
- Average journey time: 1 hour, 13 minutes
- Service frequency: 4 daily round trips
- Train number: 62701-62708

On-board services
- Class: Economy
- Seating arrangements: 2+2

Technical
- Rolling stock: MT30000 DMUs
- Track gauge: 1,435 mm (4 ft 8 1/2 in)
- Operating speed: 140 km/h (87 mph)
- Track owner: Turkish State Railways

The Konya-Karaman Regional (Turkish: Konya-Karaman Bölgeseli) is a 102.2 km (63.5 mi) regional passenger rail service operated by TCDD Taşımacılık. The train runs 4 times, in each direction, between Konya and Karaman on the Konya-Yenice railway. The train operates alongside the three daily YHT high-speed trains running south of Konya and serve as connecting service to high-speed trains terminating in Konya. Together with YHT trains and the Taurus Express (Konya-Adana), the Konya-Karaman Regional make up four of the eight daily round-trips between the two cities. The first train departed Konya on 23 August 2011.
