= Polatlı–Konya high-speed railway =

High-speed railway line in Turkey

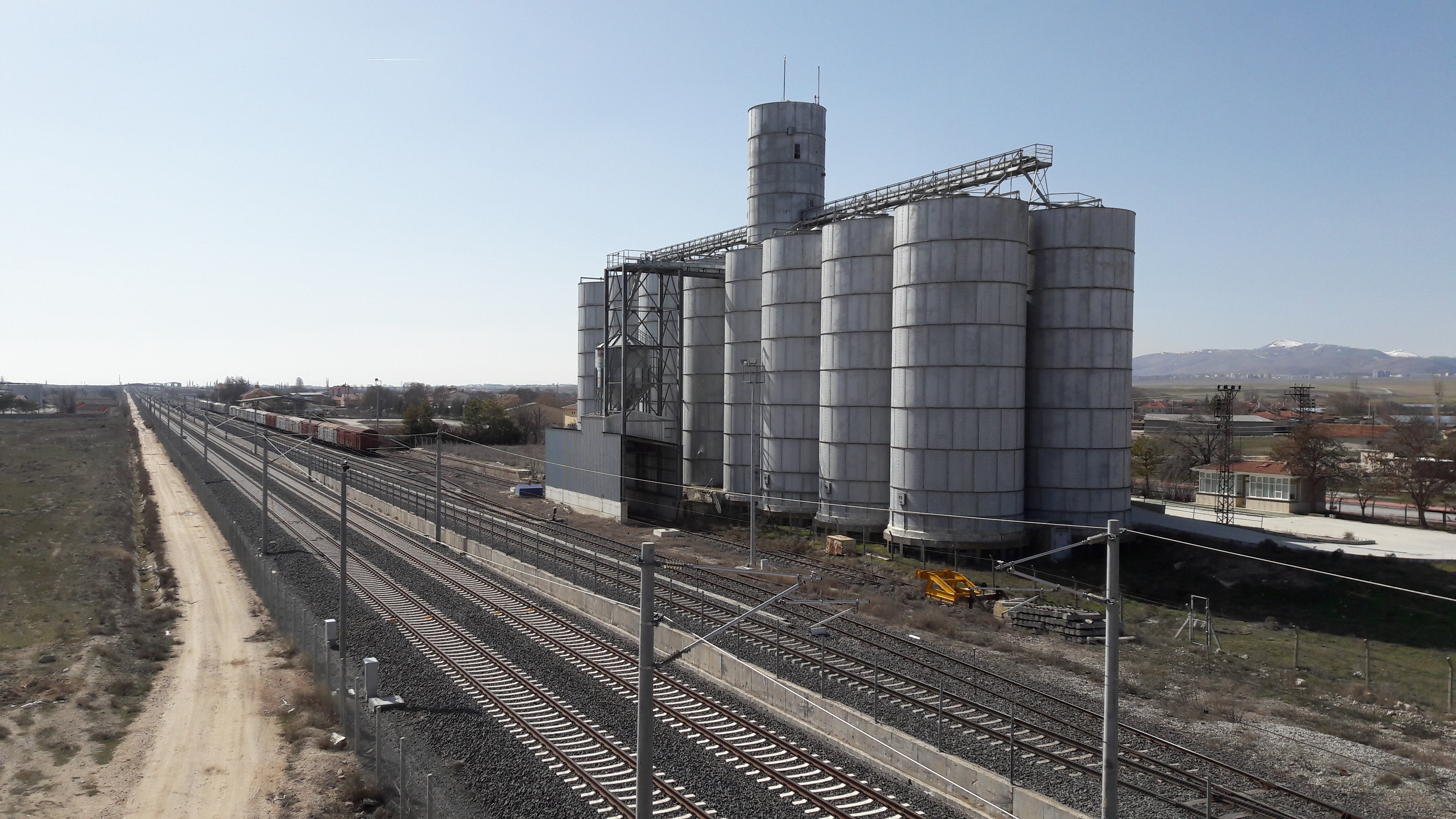
- The railway just north of Konya.

Overview
- Status: Operational
- Owner: Turkish State Railways
- Locale: Central Anatolia
- Termini: Polatlı; Konya
- Stations: 1

Service
- Type: High-speed rail Future; Higher-speed rail
- System: Turkish State Railways
- Operator: TCDD Taşımacılık
- Depot(s): Güvercinlik Yard; New Etimesgut Yard
- Rolling stock: HT65000, HT80000

History
- Opened: 23 August 2011

Technical
- Line length: 212 km (131.73 mi) (From Polatlı to Konya)
- Number of tracks: Double track
- Character: Passenger line (Mixed in Future)
- Track gauge: 1,435 mm (4 ft 8 1/2 in) standard gauge
- Loading gauge: TCDD gross gauge
- Minimum radius: 6500 m
- Electrification: 25 kV, 50 Hz AC Overhead line
- Operating speed: 250 km/h Planned: 200 km/h Passenger 80 km/h Heavy Freight
- Signalling: ETCS Level 2
- Highest elevation: 130 mm (for future heavy freight usage)
- Maximum incline: 16 ‰
Route map
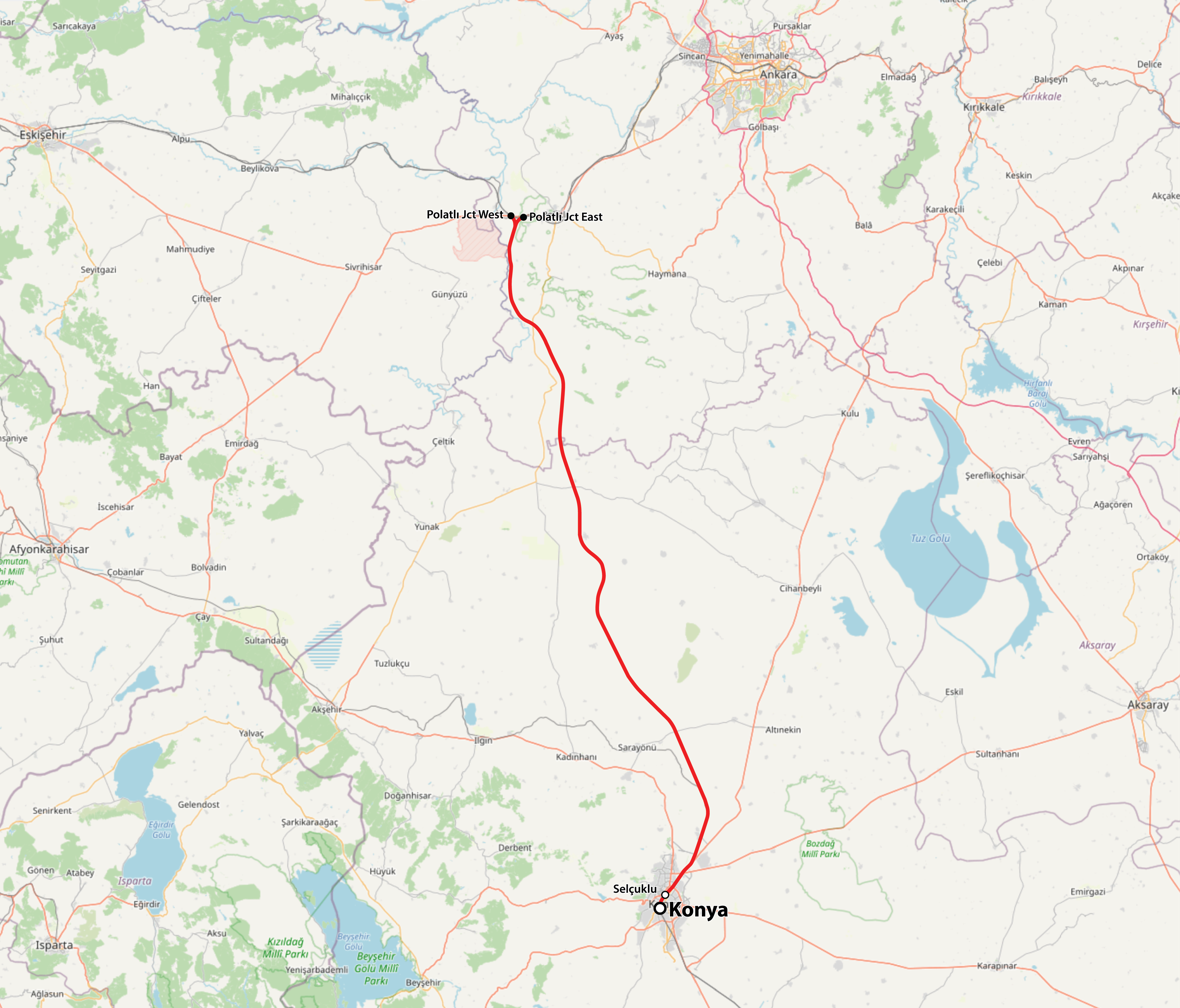
(Click to expand)

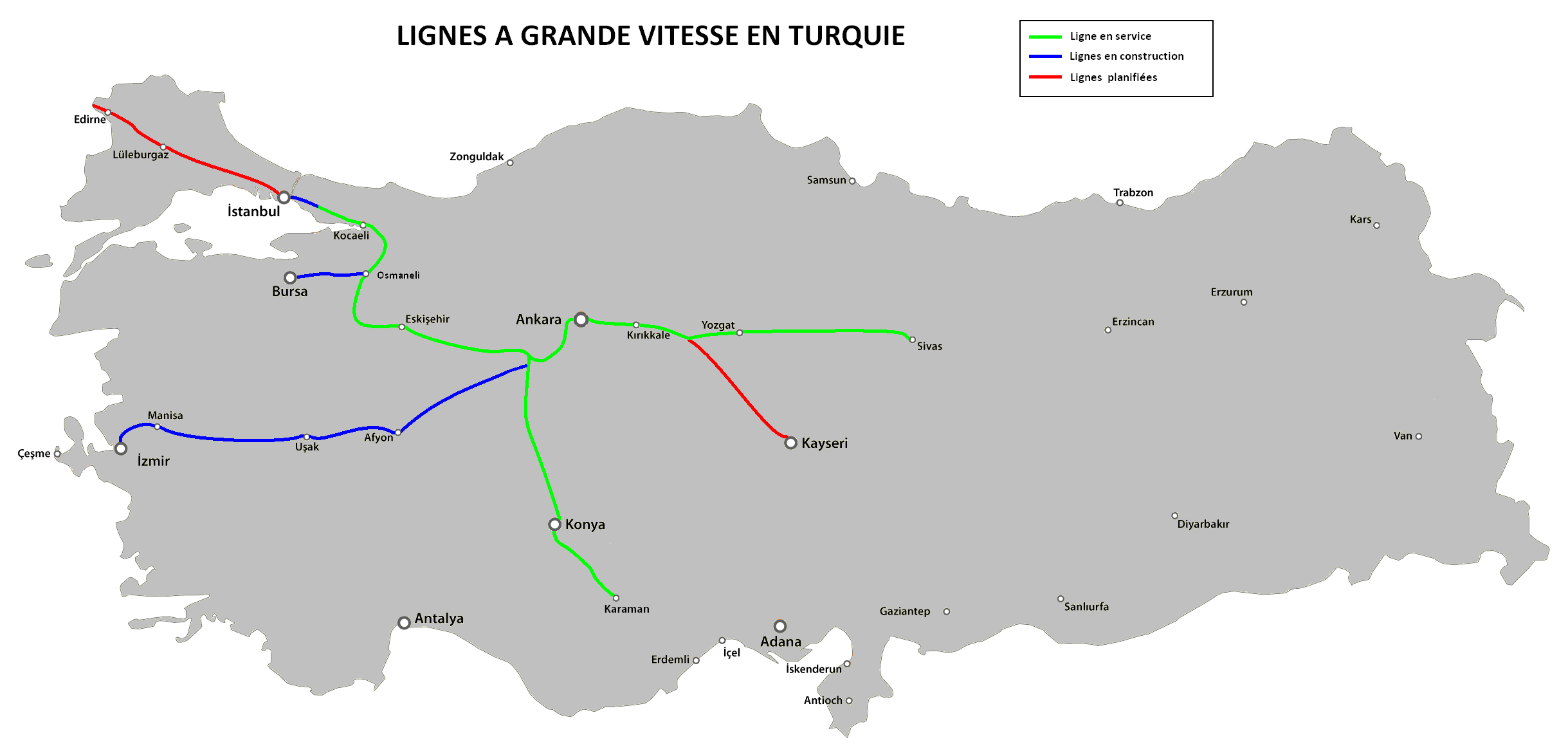
The planned Turkish high-speed rail network

The Polatlı–Konya high-speed railway (Turkish: Polatlı-Konya yüksek hızlı demiryolu) is a 211 km (131 mi) long high-speed railway running from the town of Polatlı to the central Anatolian city of Konya.

== History ==
The railway is used by the Turkish State Railways' premier high-speed passenger service, Yüksek Hızlı Tren, which operates two routes on the line; Istanbul-Konya and Ankara-Konya. The railway was opened on 23 August 2011, making it the second high-speed railway in Turkey.

Construction of the railway started on 8 July 2006 and was finished in mid-2011 at a cost of TL1 billion ($330 million). On 3 June 2011, TCDD HT65001 Piri Reis made the inaugural test run with Prime Minister Recep Tayyip Erdoğan and Minister of Transport Binali Yıldırım; departing Ankara and arriving at Konya with large media fanfare. Test runs continued for two and a half months until the line was opened to commercial traffic on 23 August.

== Gallery ==
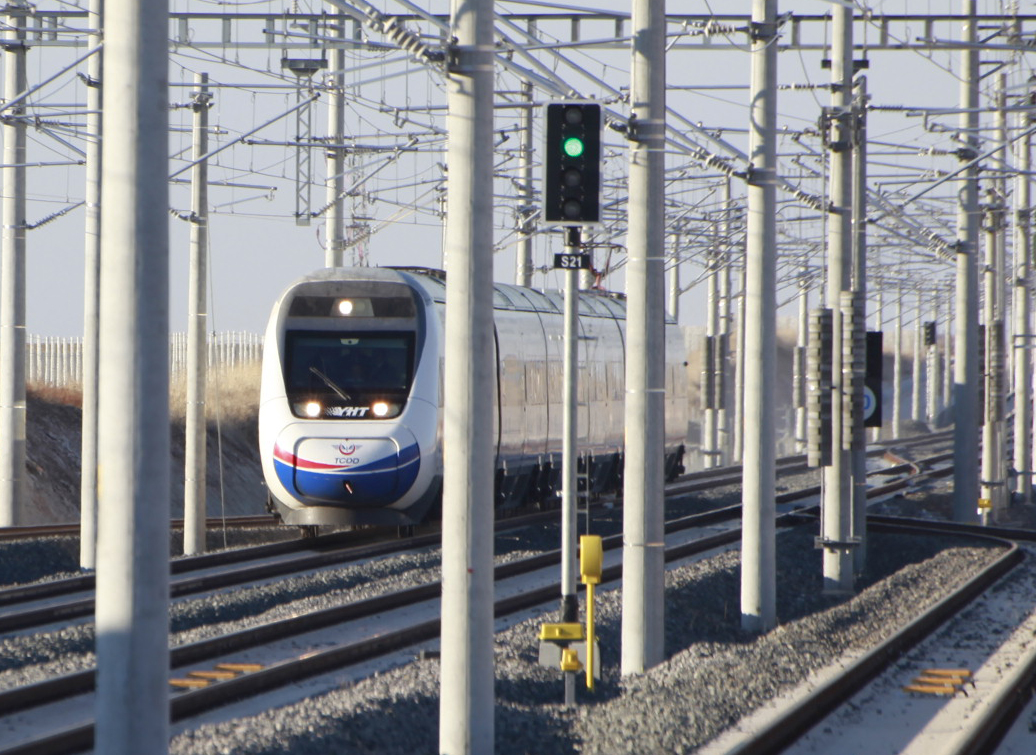
An HT65000 EMU on the line.

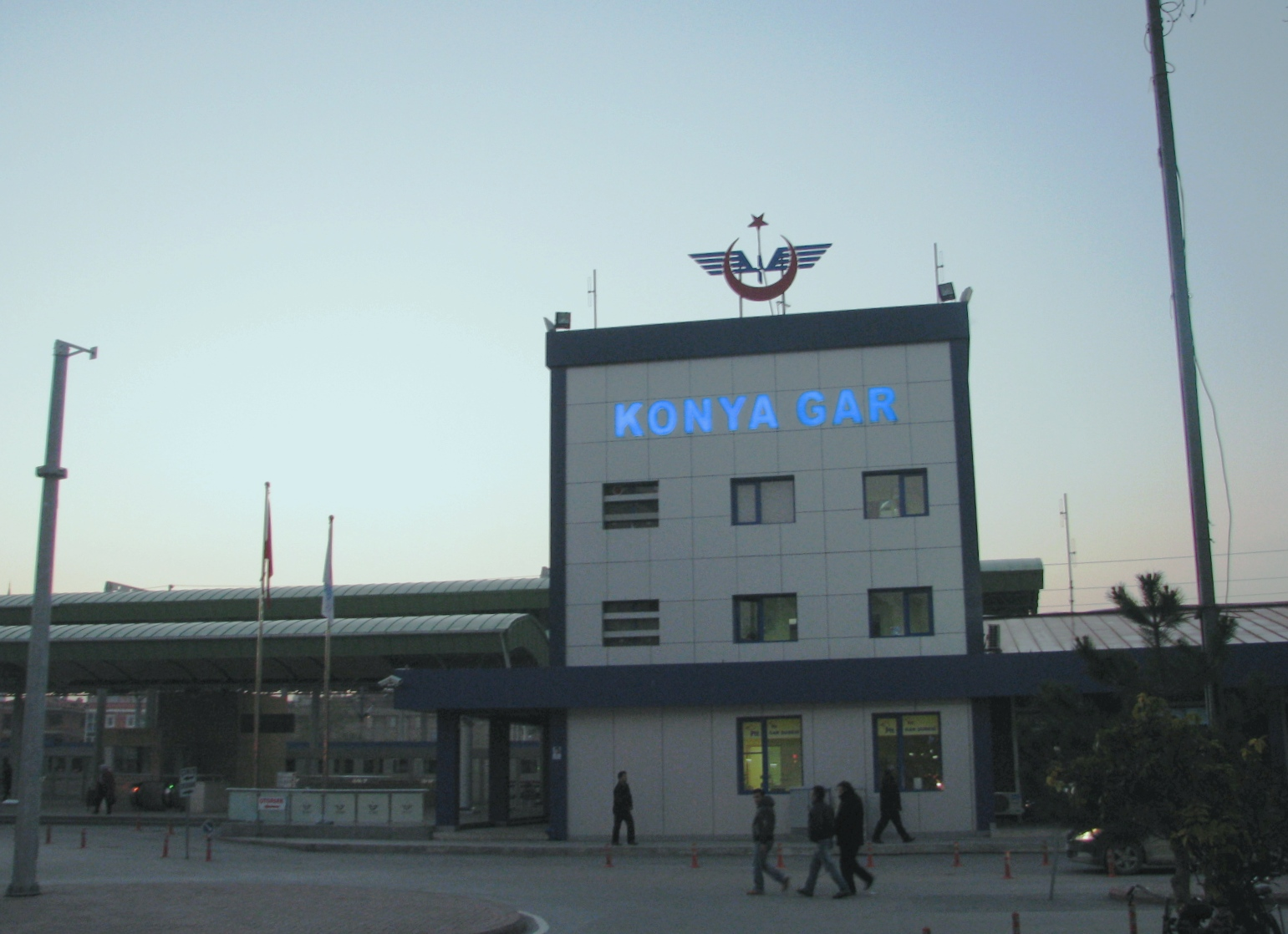
Konya Central Station

High Speed Train network

== See also ==
- High-speed rail in Turkey
