= List of populated places in Niğde Province =

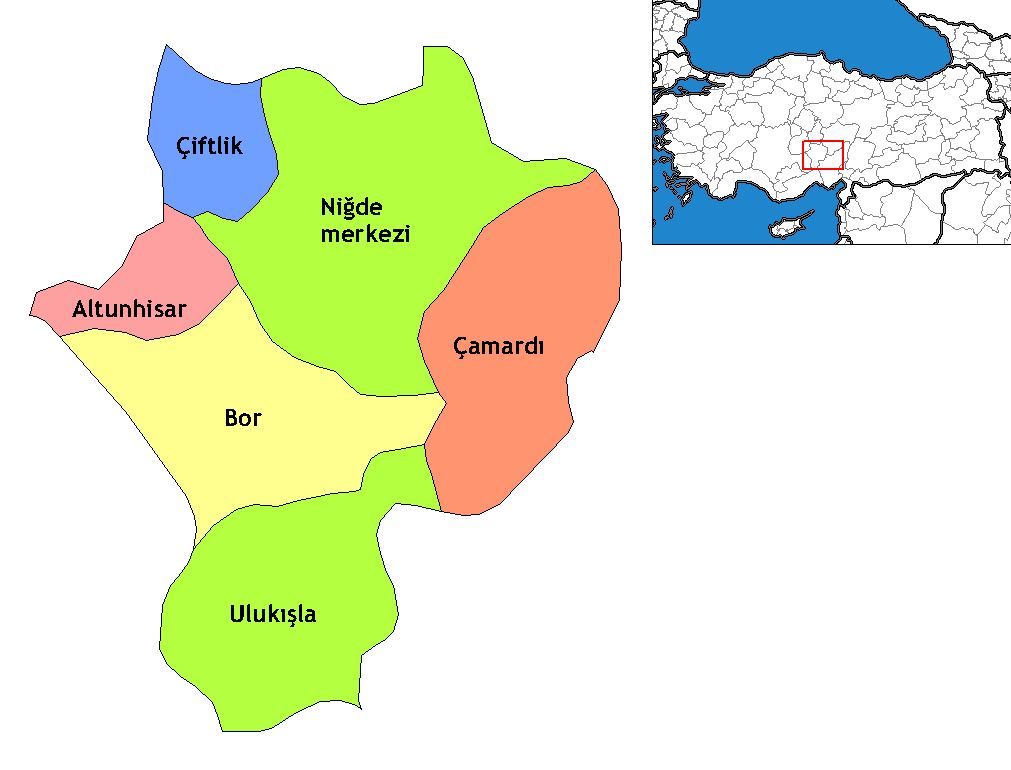
Niğde Province

Below is the list of populated places in Niğde Province, Turkey by district. In the following lists first place in each list is the administrative center of the district.

== Niğde ==
- Niğde
- Aktaş, Niğde
- Ağcaşar, Niğde
- Alay, Niğde
- Aşlama, Niğde
- Bağlama, Niğde
- Ballı, Niğde
- Çarıklı, Niğde
- Çavdarlı, Niğde
- Çayırlı, Niğde
- Değirmenli, Niğde
- Dikilitaş, Niğde
- Dündarlı, Niğde
- Edikli, Niğde
- Elmalı, Niğde
- Fertek, Niğde
- Fesleğen, Niğde
- Gösterli, Niğde
- Gülüce, Niğde
- Gümüşler, Niğde
- Hacıabdullah, Niğde
- Hacıbeyli, Niğde
- Hamamlı, Niğde
- Hançerli, Niğde
- Hasaköy, Niğde
- Himmetli, Niğde
- İçmeli, Niğde
- Karaatlı, Niğde
- Kayırlı, Niğde
- Kırkpınar, Niğde
- Kızılören, Niğde
- Kiledere, Niğde
- Konaklı, Niğde
- Koyunlu, Niğde
- Kömürcü, Niğde
- Kumluca, Niğde
- Küçükköy, Niğde
- Narköy, Niğde
- Orhanlı, Niğde
- Ovacık, Niğde
- Özyurt, Niğde
- Pınarcık, Niğde
- Sazlıca, Niğde
- Taşlıca, Niğde
- Tepeköy, Niğde
- Tırhan, Niğde
- Uluağaç, Niğde
- Yarhisar, Niğde
- Yaylayolu, Niğde
- Yeşilburç, Niğde
- Yeşilgölcük, Niğde
- Yeşilova, Niğde
- Yıldıztepe, Niğde

== Altunhisar ==
- Altunhisar
- Akçaören, Altunhisar
- Çömlekçi, Altunhisar
- Karakapı, Altunhisar
- Keçikalesi, Altunhisar
- Ulukışla, Altunhisar
- Uluören, Altunhisar
- Yakacık, Altunhisar
- Yeşilyurt, Altunhisar

== Bor ==
- Bor
- Badak, Bor
- Bahçeli, Bor
- Balcı, Bor
- Bayat, Bor
- Bereke, Bor
- Çukurkuyu, Bor
- Emen, Bor
- Gökbez, Bor
- Halaç, Bor
- Havuzlu, Bor
- Karacaören, Bor
- Karamahmutlu, Bor
- Karanlıkdere, Bor
- Kavuklu, Bor
- Kayı, Bor
- Kaynarca, Bor
- Kemerhisar, Bor
- Kılavuz, Bor
- Kızılca, Bor
- Kızılkapı, Bor
- Kürkçü, Bor
- Obruk, Bor
- Okçu, Bor
- Postallı, Bor
- Seslikaya, Bor
- Tepeköy, Bor

== Çamardı ==
- Çamardı
- Bademdere, Çamardı
- Bekçili, Çamardı
- Beyazkışlakçı, Çamardı
- Burç, Çamardı
- Celaller, Çamardı
- Çardacık, Çamardı
- Çukurbağ, Çamardı
- Demirkazık, Çamardı
- Elekgölü, Çamardı
- Eynelli, Çamardı
- Kavaklıgöl, Çamardı
- Kavlaktepe, Çamardı
- Kocapınar, Çamardı
- Mahmatlı, Çamardı
- Orhaniye, Çamardı
- Ören, Çamardı
- Pınarbaşı, Çamardı
- Sulucaova, Çamardı
- Üçkapılı, Çamardı
- Yelatan, Çamardı
- Yeniköy, Çamardı

== Çiftlik ==
- Çiftlik
- Asmasız, Çiftlik
- Azatlı, Çiftlik
- Bozköy, Çiftlik
- Çardak, Çiftlik
- Çınarlı, Çiftlik
- Divarlı, Çiftlik
- Kitreli, Çiftlik
- Kula, Çiftlik
- Mahmutlu, Çiftlik
- Murtazaköy, Çiftlik
- Ovalıbağ, Çiftlik
- Sultanpınarı, Çiftlik
- Şeyhler, Çiftlik

== Ulukışla ==
- Ulukışla
- Alihoca, Ulukışla
- Altay, Ulukışla
- Ardıçlı, Ulukışla
- Başmakçı, Ulukışla
- Bayağıl, Ulukışla
- Çanakçı, Ulukışla
- Çiftehan, Ulukışla
- Çifteköy, Ulukışla
- Darboğaz, Ulukışla
- Elmalı, Ulukışla
- Eminlik, Ulukışla
- Emirler, Ulukışla
- Gedelli, Ulukışla
- Gümüşköy, Ulukışla
- Güney, Ulukışla
- Hacıbekirli, Ulukışla
- Handere, Ulukışla
- Hasangazi, Ulukışla
- Horoz, Ulukışla
- Hüsniye, Ulukışla
- İlhanköy, Ulukışla
- İmrahor, Ulukışla
- Karacaören, Ulukışla
- Kılan, Ulukışla
- Koçak, Ulukışla
- Kolsuz, Ulukışla
- Kozluca, Ulukışla
- Madenköy, Ulukışla
- Ovacık, Ulukışla
- Porsuk, Ulukışla
- Şeyhömerli, Ulukışla
- Tabaklı, Ulukışla
- Tekneçukur, Ulukışla
- Tepeköy, Ulukışla
- Toraman, Ulukışla
- Ünlüyaka, Ulukışla
- Yeniyıldız, Ulukışla
