= Bereke =

Bereke may refer to:

- Berke, Mongol ruler
- Bereke, Kazakhstan
- Bereke, Bor
