= Aspenzinsos =

Town of ancient Cappadocia

Coordinates: 37°59′55″N 34°27′12″E

Aspenzinsos was a town of ancient Cappadocia, inhabited in Byzantine times.

Its site is located near Karanlıkdere, Asiatic Turkey.
