= Çukurkuyu, Niğde =

Çukurkuyu
- Municipality
- Location in Turkey Çukurkuyu (Turkey Central Anatolia)
- Coordinates: 37°52′N 34°20′E
- Country: Turkey
- Province: Niğde
- District: Bor
- Elevation: 1,075 m (3,527 ft)
- Population (2022): 2,312
- Time zone: UTC+3 (TRT)
- Postal code: 51720
- Area code: 0388

Çukurkuyu is a town (belde) in the Bor District, Niğde Province, Turkey. Its population is 2,312 (2022). It is situated in the plains of Central Anatolia, to the south of Melendiz Mountain. Distance to Bor is 25 kilometres (16 mi) to Niğde is 35 kilometres (22 mi). The village was founded by semi nomadic Turkmen tribes. In 1956 it was declared a seat of township. Agriculture is the main economic activity. Carpet weaving is secondary activity. Some town residents also work in Sugar refinery in Bor.

== Notable natives ==
- Ömer Halisdemir (1974–2016), non-commissioned officer, who was killed on duty in the night of 2016 Turkish coup d'état attempt, right after he shot dead a pro-coup general and prevented so the coupists capture the headquarters of the Special Forces Command in Ankara. He is remembered as a major contributor to the failure of the coup attempt.
