= Okçu =

Okçu may refer to:

- Okçu, Bor, village in Niğde Province, Turkey
- Okçu, Göle, village in Ardahan Province, Turkey

OKCU may refer to:

- Oklahoma City University
