= Karagöl (Toros) =

Karagöl, Toros
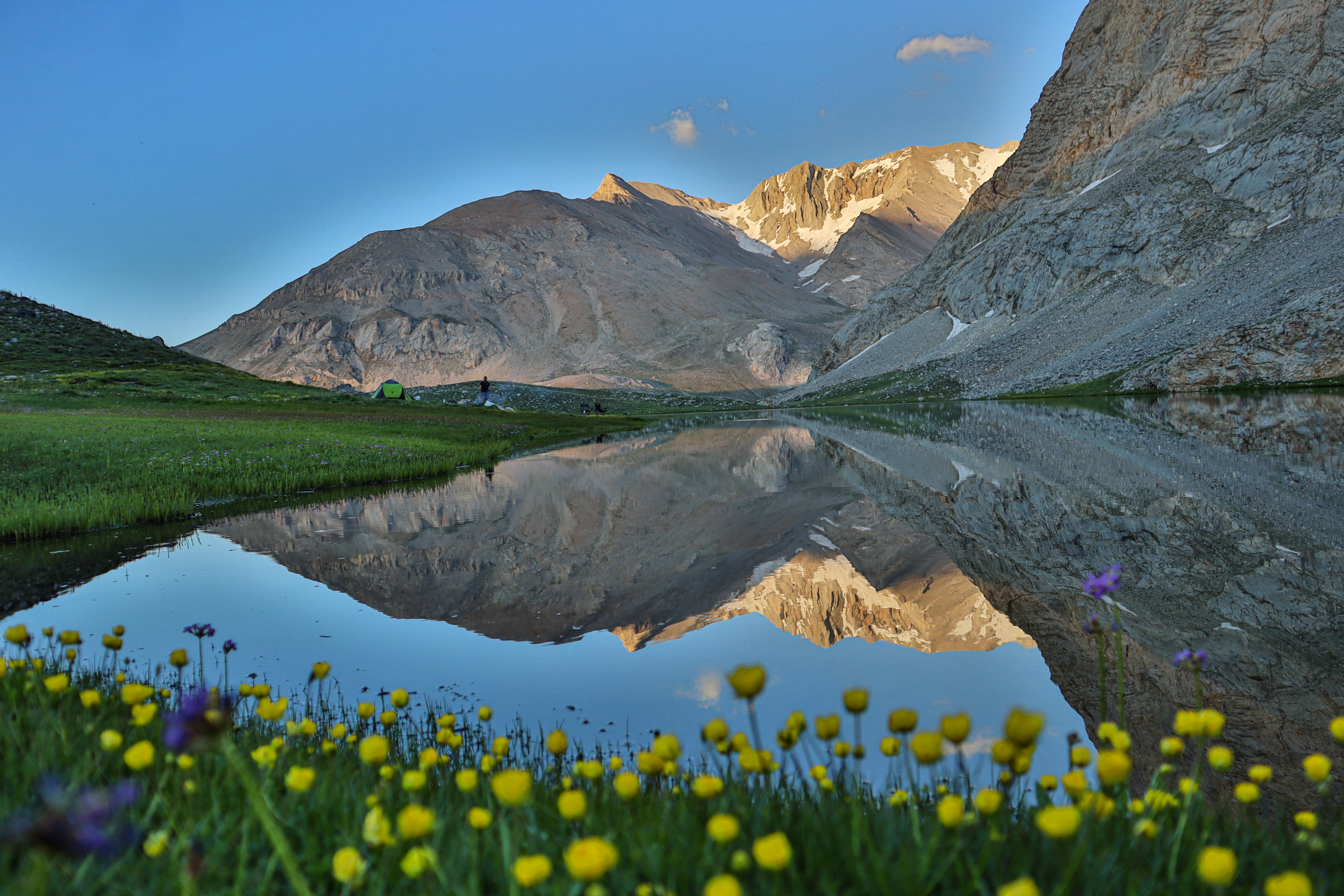
- A view of Karagöl in the Bolkar Toros Mountains

- Location within Turkey
- Location: Taurus Mountains, Turkey
- Coordinates: 37°24′11″N 34°33′30″E
- Type: Volcanic crater lake
- Surface area: 25,000 square metres (270,000 sq ft)
- Surface elevation: 2,650 metres (8,690 ft)

Karagöl is a small crater lake in the Taurus Mountains in Turkey.

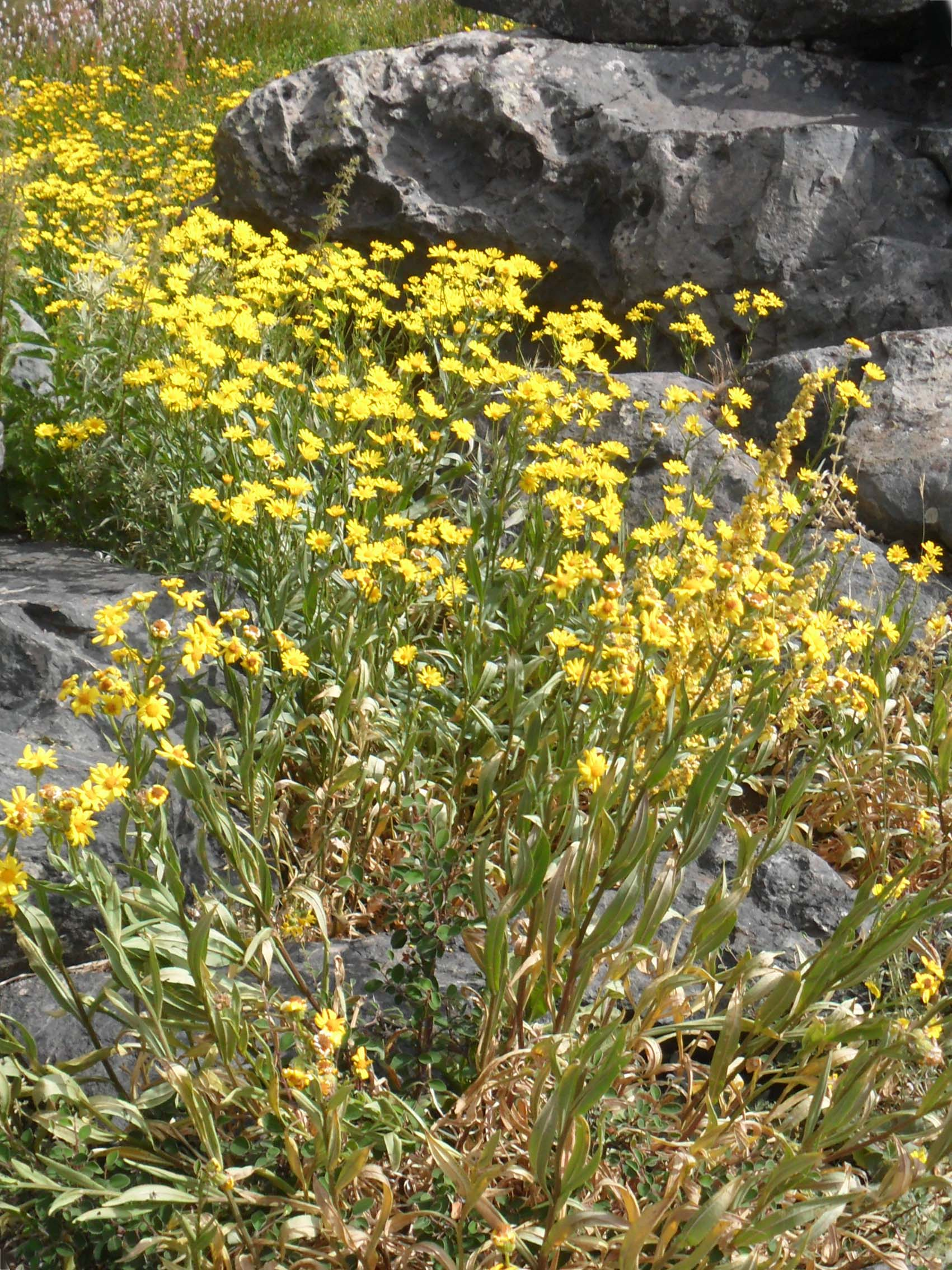
Yellow Chamomile (Cota tinctoria) around the lake

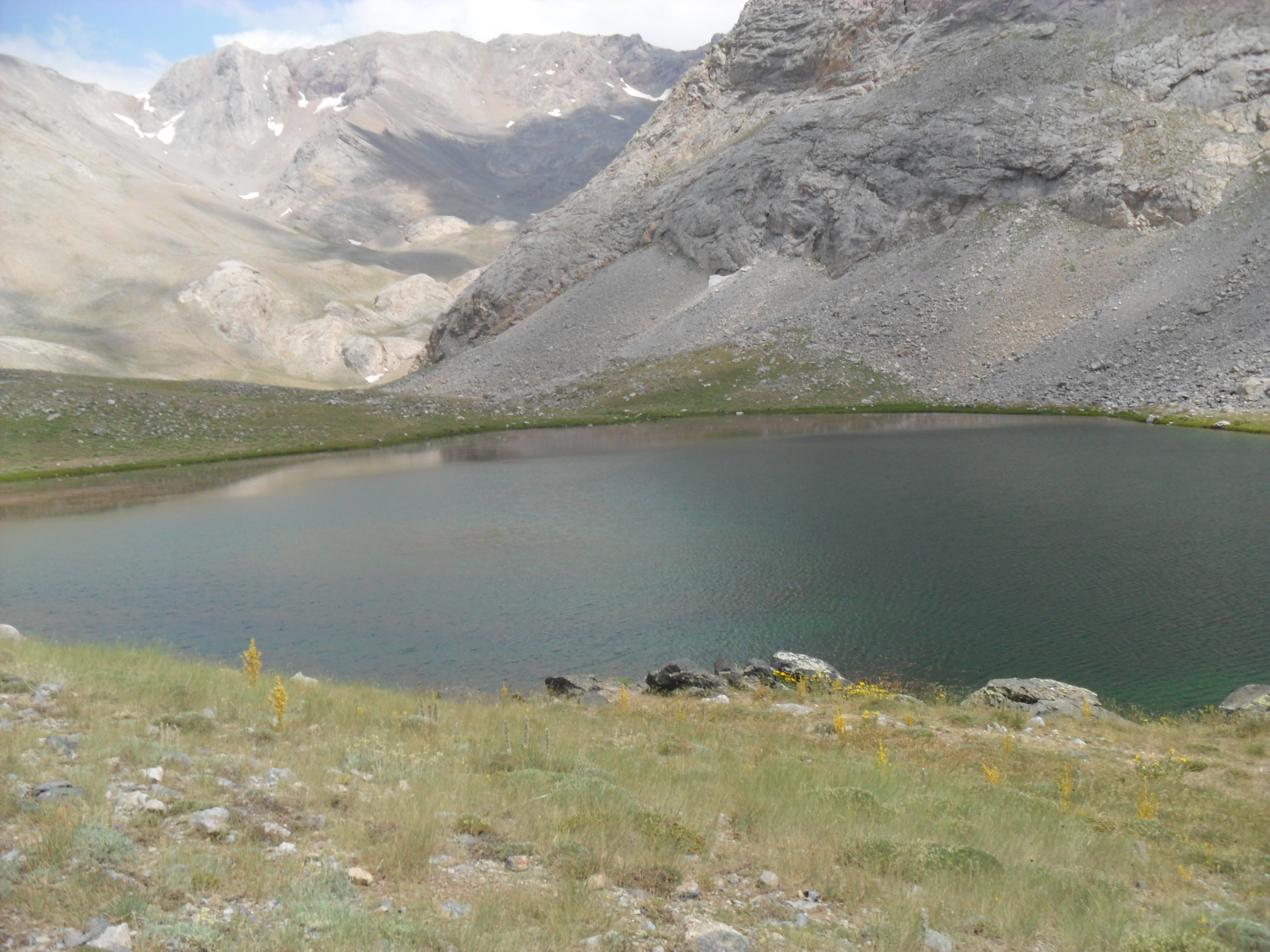
Karagöl (late Summer view)

== Geography ==
The midpoint of the lake is at 37°24′11″N 34°33′30″E. It is situated almost on the borderline of Niğde Province and Mersin Province and is accessible from Darboğaz, a town in the Ulukışla district of Niğde Province. Its distance to the Turkish state highway D.750 is about 20 kilometres (12 mi).

== The lake ==
Its altitude is about 2,650 metres (8,690 ft). The surface area fluctuates, depending on winter snow fall, but is usually about 25,000 square metres (270,000 sq ft). Due to high altitude, the area around the lake is devoid of trees, although the shore is covered with shrubs and wild flowers. The lake is home to Rana holtzi, an endemic frog (Werner, 1898), which is popularly called the "Frog of Toros" (Turkish: Toros kurbağası) The lake is popular with mountaineers and trekkers.

== Around Karagöl ==
Meydan Yaylası, a high plateau at the end point of the road from the highway, is about 2 kilometres (1.2 mi) north of Karagöl. Mountaineers usually begin from Meydan Yaylası. Another interesting place is a smaller lake named Çiniligöl to the southwest of Karagöl and about 50 metres (160 ft) higher and 300 metres (980 ft) from Karagöl.
