= Tepeköy, Bor =

Tepeköy
- Village
- Location within Turkey Location within Turkey Central Anatolia
- Coordinates: 37°59′N 34°26′E
- Country: Turkey
- Province: Niğde
- District: Bor
- Elevation: 1,330 m (4,360 ft)
- Population (2022): 692
- Time zone: UTC+3 (TRT)
- Postal code: 51700
- Area code: 0388

Tepeköy is a village in Bor District of Niğde Province, Turkey. Its population is 692 (2022). It is situated in the southwestern slopes of Melendiz Mountain. Distance to Bor is 20 kilometres (12 mi) to Niğde is 34 kilometres (21 mi).
