= Kılavuz, Bor =

Kılavuz
- Village
- Location within Turkey Location within Turkey Central Anatolia
- Coordinates: 37°48′N 34°46′E
- Country: Turkey
- Province: Niğde
- District: Bor
- Elevation: 1,560 m (5,120 ft)
- Population (2022): 368
- Time zone: UTC+3 (TRT)
- Postal code: 51700
- Area code: 0388

Kılavuz is a village in Bor District of Niğde Province, Turkey. Its population is 368 (2022). It is in the northern slopes of the Toros Mountains. Its distance to Bor is 28 kilometres (17 mi) to Niğde is 23 kilometres (14 mi).
