= Badak, Bor =

Badak
- Village
- Location within Turkey Location within Turkey Central Anatolia
- Coordinates: 37°44′N 34°26′E
- Country: Turkey
- Province: Niğde
- District: Bor
- Elevation: 1,060 m (3,480 ft)
- Population (2022): 368
- Time zone: UTC+3 (TRT)
- Postal code: 51700
- Area code: 0388

Badak is a village in Bor District of Niğde Province, Turkey. Its population is 368 (2022). It is situated in the Central Anatolian plains. Its distance to Bor is 25 kilometres (16 mi) to Niğde is 39 kilometres (24 mi).
