= Emen, Bor =

Emen
- Village
- Location within Turkey Location within Turkey Central Anatolia
- Coordinates: 37°49′N 34°27′E
- Country: Turkey
- Province: Niğde
- District: Bor
- Elevation: 1,065 m (3,494 ft)
- Population (2022): 130
- Time zone: UTC+3 (TRT)
- Postal code: 51700
- Area code: 0388

Emen is a village in Bor District of Niğde Province, Turkey. Its population is 130 (2022). It is situated in the Central Anatolian plains. Its distance to Bor is 15 kilometres (9.3 mi) to Niğde is 29 kilometres (18 mi). It is within the Eastern European Summer Time Zone (GMT+3)
