= Kaynarca, Bor =

Kaynarca
- Village
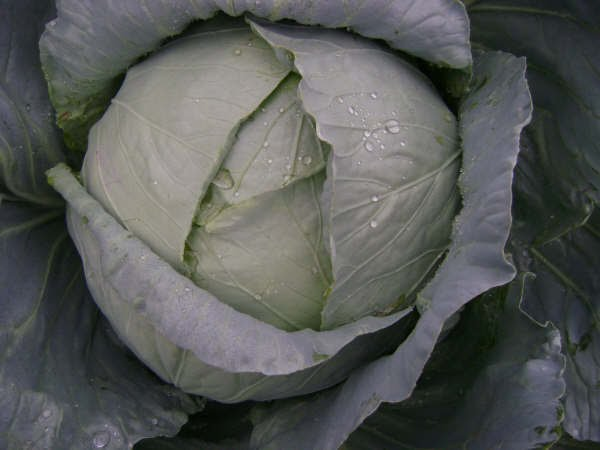
- Kaynarca cabbage

- Location within Turkey Location within Turkey Central Anatolia
- Coordinates: 37°50′N 34°38′E
- Country: Turkey
- Province: Niğde
- District: Bor
- Elevation: 1,220 m (4,000 ft)
- Population (2022): 779
- Time zone: UTC+3 (TRT)
- Postal code: 51700
- Area code: 0388

Kaynarca is a village in Bor District of Niğde Province, Turkey. Its population is 779 (2022). It is to the east of Turkish state highway D805 which connects Niğde to the Mediterranean coast. The distance to Bor is 8 kilometres (5.0 mi) and to Niğde 15 kilometres (9.3 mi). The village is famous for white cabbage production.
