= Kürkçü, Bor =

Kürkçü
- Village
- Location within Turkey Location within Turkey Central Anatolia
- Coordinates: 37°42′N 34°43′E
- Country: Turkey
- Province: Niğde
- District: Bor
- Elevation: 1,375 m (4,511 ft)
- Population (2022): 75
- Time zone: UTC+3 (TRT)
- Postal code: 51700
- Area code: 0388

Kürkçü is a village in Bor District of Niğde Province, Turkey. Its population is 75 (2022). It is situated to the north of Taurus Mountains. Its distance to Bor is 31 kilometres (19 mi) to Niğde is 40 kilometres (25 mi).
