= Karamahmutlu =

- Village
- Location within Turkey Location within Turkey Central Anatolia
- Coordinates: 37°50′N 34°39′E
- Country: Turkey
- Province: Niğde
- District: Bor
- Elevation: 1,250 m (4,100 ft)
- Population (2022): 140
- Time zone: UTC+3 (TRT)
- Postal code: 51700
- Area code: 0388

Karamahmutlu is a village in Bor District of Niğde Province, Turkey. Its population is 140 (2022). It is situated to the east of Turkish state highway D.805 which connects Niğde to Mediterranean coast. Its distance to Bor is 21 kilometres (13 mi), to Niğde is 31 kilometres (19 mi).
