= Bor District, Niğde =

District of Niğde Province, Turkey

Bor District
- District
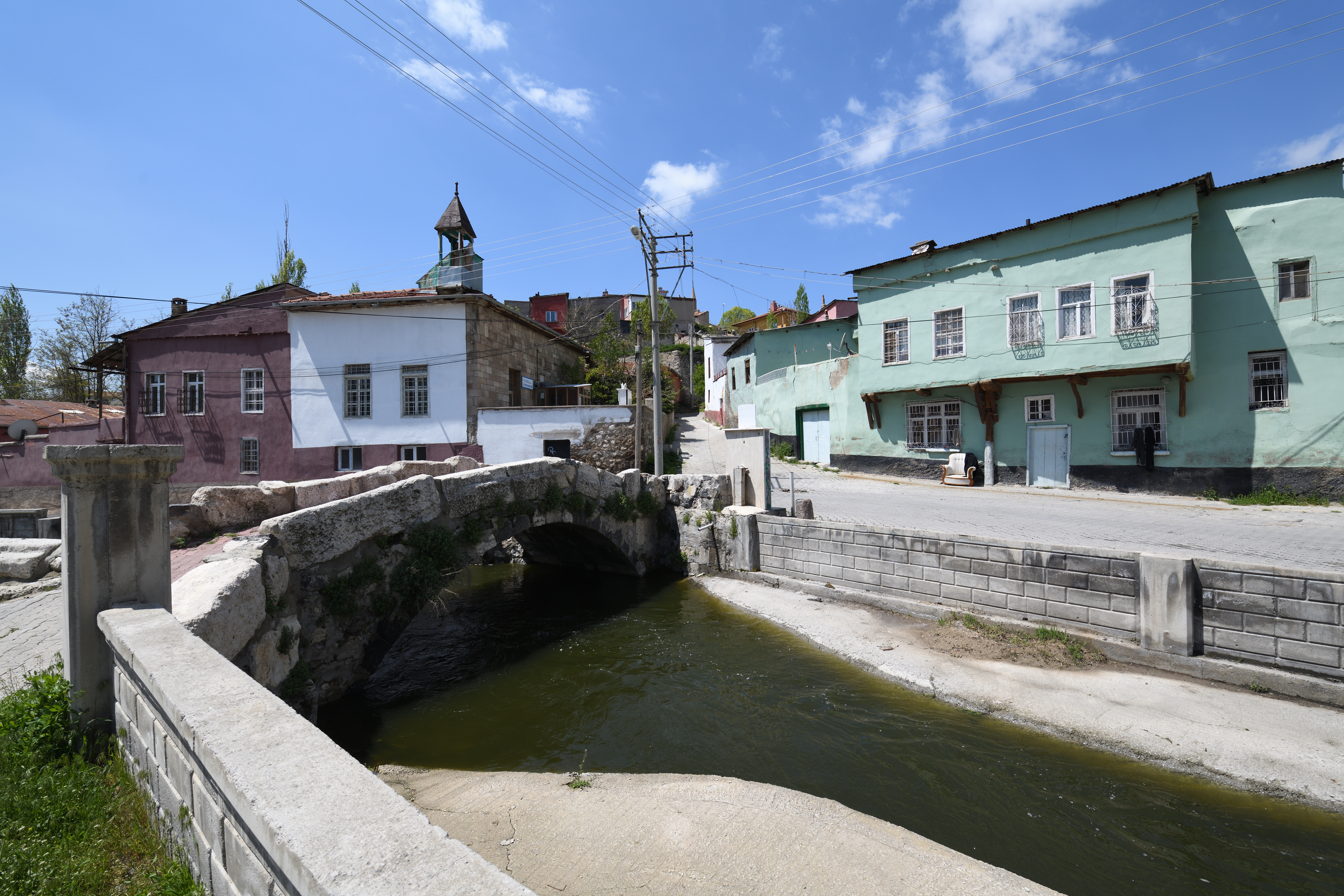
- Bor town

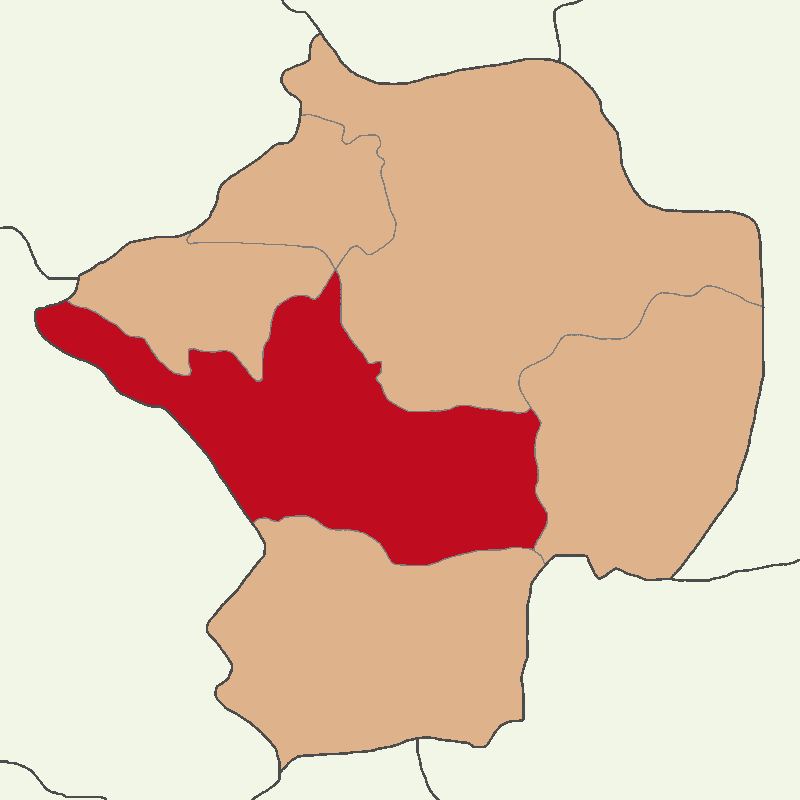
- Map showing Bor District in Niğde Province

- Location within Turkey Location within Turkey Central Anatolia
- Coordinates: 37°53′N 34°34′E
- Country: Turkey
- Province: Niğde
- Seat: Bor

Government
  - Kaymakam: Mehmet Yavuz
- Area: 1,522 km^{2} (588 sq mi)
- Population (2022): 60,948
  - Density: 40.04/km^{2} (103.7/sq mi)
- Time zone: UTC+3 (TRT)
- Website: www.bor.gov.tr

Bor District is a district of the Niğde Province of Turkey. Its seat is the town of Bor. Its area is 1,522 km^{2}, and its population is 60,948 (2022).

== Composition ==
There are four municipalities in Bor District:

- Bahçeli
- Bor
- Çukurkuyu
- Kemerhisar

There are 23 villages in Bor District:

- Badak
- Balcı
- Bayat
- Bereket
- Emen
- Gökbez
- Halaç
- Havuzlu
- Karacaören
- Karamahmutlu
- Karanlıkdere
- Kavuklu
- Kayı
- Kaynarca
- Kılavuz
- Kızılca
- Kızılkapı
- Kürkçü
- Obruk
- Okçu
- Postallı
- Seslikaya
- Tepeköy
