= Bayat, Bor =

Bayat
- Village
- Location within Turkey Location within Turkey Central Anatolia
- Coordinates: 37°56′N 34°21′E
- Country: Turkey
- Province: Niğde
- District: Bor
- Elevation: 1,040 m (3,410 ft)
- Population (2022): 407
- Time zone: UTC+3 (TRT)
- Postal code: 51700
- Area code: 0388

Bayat is a village in Bor District of Niğde Province, Turkey. Its population is 407 (2022). It is situated in the plains of Central Anatolia, to the south of Melendis Mountain. Distance to Bor is 19 kilometres (12 mi) to Niğde is 29 kilometres (18 mi).
