= Postallı, Bor =

Postallı
- Village
- Location within Turkey Location within Turkey Central Anatolia
- Coordinates: 37°44′N 34°45′E
- Country: Turkey
- Province: Niğde
- District: Bor
- Elevation: 1,420 m (4,660 ft)
- Population (2022): 229
- Time zone: UTC+3 (TRT)
- Postal code: 51700
- Area code: 0388

Postallı is a village in Bor District of Niğde Province, Turkey. Its population is 229 (2022). It is situated in the peneplane area to the north of Toros Mountains. Postallı pond an artificial pond for irrigation is to the northeast of the village. Its distance to Bor is 32 kilometres (20 mi) to Niğde is 41 kilometres (25 mi).
