= Halaç, Bor =

Halaç
- Village
- Location within Turkey Location within Turkey Central Anatolia
- Coordinates: 37°49′N 34°42′E
- Country: Turkey
- Province: Niğde
- District: Bor
- Elevation: 1,345 m (4,413 ft)
- Population (2022): 411
- Time zone: UTC+3 (TRT)
- Postal code: 51700
- Area code: 0388

Halaç is a village in Bor District of Niğde Province, Turkey. Its population is 411 (2022). It is situated to the east of Bahçeli. Its distance to Bor is 16 kilometres (9.9 mi) to Niğde is 25 kilometres (16 mi).
