= Obruk, Bor =

Obruk
- Village
- Location within Turkey Location within Turkey Central Anatolia
- Coordinates: 37°59′N 34°01′E
- Country: Turkey
- Province: Niğde
- District: Bor
- Elevation: 1,130 m (3,710 ft)
- Population (2022): 1,044
- Time zone: UTC+3 (TRT)
- Postal code: 51700
- Area code: 0388

Obruk is a village in Bor District of Niğde Province, Turkey. Its population is 1,044 (2022). It is situated to the west of Turkish state highway D.750. Its distance from Bor is 65 kilometres (40 mi) and to Niğde is 79 kilometres (49 mi).
