= Kızılkapı, Bor =

Kızılkapı
- Village
- Location within Turkey Location within Turkey Central Anatolia
- Coordinates: 37°46′N 34°51′E
- Country: Turkey
- Province: Niğde
- District: Bor
- Elevation: 1,640 m (5,380 ft)
- Population (2022): 65
- Time zone: UTC+3 (TRT)
- Postal code: 51700
- Area code: 0388

Kızılkapı is a small village in Bor District of Niğde Province, Turkey. Its population is 65 (2022). It is situated in the northern slopes of Toros Mountains. Its distance to Bor is 36 kilometres (22 mi) to Niğde is 30 kilometres (19 mi).
