= Seslikaya, Bor =

Seslikaya
- Village
- Location within Turkey Location within Turkey Central Anatolia
- Coordinates: 37°47′N 34°29′E
- Country: Turkey
- Province: Niğde
- District: Bor
- Elevation: 1,060 m (3,480 ft)
- Population (2022): 161
- Time zone: UTC+3 (TRT)
- Postal code: 51700
- Area code: 0388

Seslikaya is a village in Bor District of Niğde Province, Turkey. Its population is 161 (2022). It is situated in the Central Anatolian plains. Its distance to Bor is 16 kilometres (9.9 mi), to Niğde is 30 kilometres (19 mi).
