= Kızılca, Bor =

Kızılca
- Village
- Location within Turkey Location within Turkey Central Anatolia
- Coordinates: 37°50′N 34°21′E
- Country: Turkey
- Province: Niğde
- District: Bor
- Elevation: 1,065 m (3,494 ft)
- Population (2022): 1,050
- Time zone: UTC+3 (TRT)
- Postal code: 51740
- Area code: 0388

Kızılca is a village in Bor District of Niğde Province, Turkey. Its population is 1,050 (2022). Before the 2013 reorganisation, it was a town (belde). It is situated in Central Anatolian plains. Distance to Bor is 19 kilometres (12 mi) to Niğde is 29 kilometres (18 mi). The settlement was founded in 1700s by a Turkmen tribe from Dulkadir Eyalet (east of present location) upon Ottoman sultan's decree. In 1956 it was declared a seat of township. The major economic activity is agriculture. Main crops are cereals, apple, potato and sugar beet. Animal husbandry is a secondary activity
