= Balcı, Bor =

Balcı
- Village
- Location within Turkey Location within Turkey Central Anatolia
- Coordinates: 37°58′N 34°27′E
- Country: Turkey
- Province: Niğde
- District: Bor
- Elevation: 1,475 m (4,839 ft)
- Population (2022): 663
- Time zone: UTC+3 (TRT)
- Postal code: 51700
- Area code: 0388

Balcı (formerly Cücü) is a village in Bor District of Niğde Province, Turkey. Its population is 663 (2022). It is situated in the southern slopes of Melendiz Mountain. Distance to Bor is 17 kilometres (11 mi) to Niğde is 27 kilometres (17 mi). The village was founded in the Middle Ages by a rebellious commander of Karamanoğlu Beylik (a Turkmen principality between 13th-15thy centuries) in a remote valley of the mountain. In 1940s the village was relocated following an earthquake. Main economic activities of the village are agriculture and beehiving. ( Bal means "honey") . Cereals, sugar beet and fodder are the crops of the village.
