= Karacaören, Bor =

Karacaören
- Village
- Location within Turkey Location within Turkey Central Anatolia
- Coordinates: 37°48′N 34°44′E
- Country: Turkey
- Province: Niğde
- District: Bor
- Elevation: 1,500 m (4,900 ft)
- Population (2022): 146
- Time zone: UTC+3 (TRT)
- Postal code: 51700
- Area code: 0388

Karacaören is a village in Bor District of Niğde Province, Turkey. Its population is 146 (2022). It is located in the northern slopes of the Taurus Mountains. Its distance to Bor is 19 kilometres (12 mi) and to Niğde is 28 kilometres (17 mi).
