= Kayı, Bor =

Kayı
- Village
- Location within Turkey Location within Turkey Central Anatolia
- Coordinates: 37°54′N 34°24′E
- Country: Turkey
- Province: Niğde
- District: Bor
- Elevation: 1,080 m (3,540 ft)
- Population (2022): 678
- Time zone: UTC+3 (TRT)
- Postal code: 51700
- Area code: 0388

Kayı is a village in Bor District of Niğde Province, Turkey. Its population is 678 (2022). It is situated in the plains of Central Anatolia, to the south of Melendiz Mountain. Distance to Bor is 29 kilometres (18 mi) to Niğde is 39 kilometres (24 mi).
