= Havuzlu, Bor =

Havuzlu
- Village
- Location within Turkey Location within Turkey Central Anatolia
- Coordinates: 37°47′N 34°38′E
- Country: Turkey
- Province: Niğde
- District: Bor
- Elevation: 1,280 m (4,200 ft)
- Population (2022): 153
- Time zone: UTC+3 (TRT)
- Postal code: 51700
- Area code: 0388

Havuzlu is a village in Bor District of Niğde Province, Turkey. Its population is 153 (2022). It is on the approach road to Turkish motor way O.21. Its distance to Bor is 20 kilometres (12 mi) to Niğde is 24 kilometres (15 mi). The village was founded on an old settlement (probably a part of ancient Tyana. According to one report the former name Baravun of the village means "dense forest" in old Turkish.
