= Kavuklu, Bor =

Kavuklu
- Village
- Location within Turkey Location within Turkey Central Anatolia
- Coordinates: 37°42′N 34°36′E
- Country: Turkey
- Province: Niğde
- District: Bor
- Elevation: 1,300 m (4,300 ft)
- Population (2022): 172
- Time zone: UTC+3 (TRT)
- Postal code: 51700
- Area code: 0388

Kavuklu is a village in Bor District of Niğde Province, Turkey. Its population is 172 (2022). It is located on the approach road to Turkish motor way O.21. Its distance to Bor is 21 kilometres (13 mi), to Niğde is 31 kilometres (19 mi).
