= Gökbez, Bor =

Gökbez
- Village
- Location within Turkey Location within Turkey Central Anatolia
- Coordinates: 37°45′N 34°40′E
- Country: Turkey
- Province: Niğde
- District: Bor
- Elevation: 1,420 m (4,660 ft)
- Population (2022): 240
- Time zone: UTC+3 (TRT)
- Postal code: 51700
- Area code: 0388

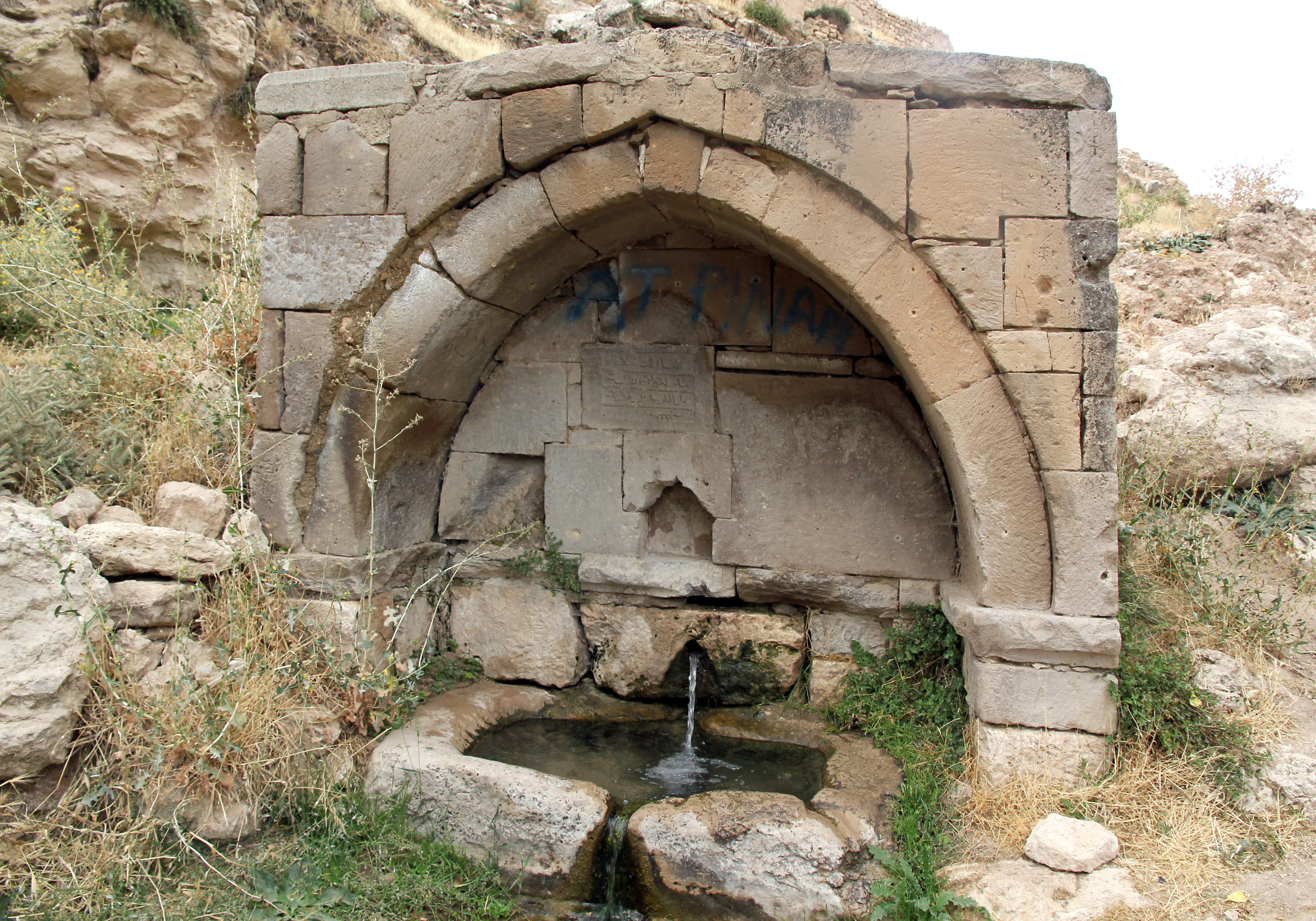

Gökbez is a village in Bor District of Niğde Province, Turkey. Its population is 240 (2022). It is situated in the northern slopes of the Toros Mountains. Its distance to Bor is 20 kilometres (12 mi) to Niğde is 25 kilometres (16 mi).
