= Okçu, Bor =

Okçu
- Village
- Location within Turkey Location within Turkey Central Anatolia
- Coordinates: 37°56′N 34°32′E
- Country: Turkey
- Province: Niğde
- District: Bor
- Elevation: 1,300 m (4,300 ft)
- Population (2022): 208
- Time zone: UTC+3 (TRT)
- Postal code: 51700
- Area code: 0388

Okçu is a village in Bor District of Niğde Province, Turkey. Its population is 208 (2022). It is situated in the southern slopes of Melendiz Mountain. Distance to Bor is 8 kilometres (5.0 mi) to Niğde is 22 kilometres (14 mi).
