= Çiftehan =

Settlement in Turkey

- Village
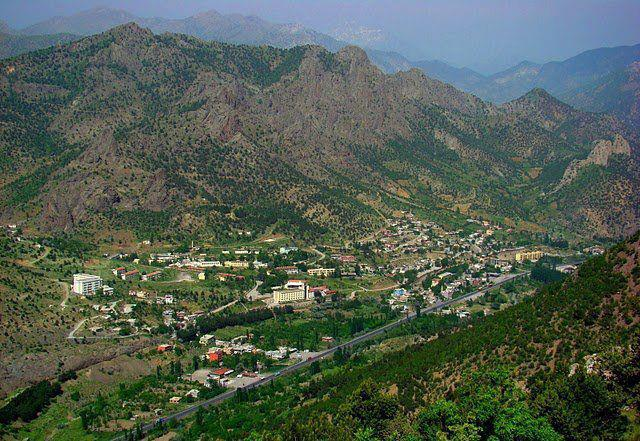
- Çiftehan

- Location within Turkey Location within Turkey Central Anatolia
- Coordinates: 37°30′44″N 34°46′10″E
- Country: Turkey
- Province: Niğde
- District: Ulukışla
- Elevation: 1,000 m (3,300 ft)
- Time zone: UTC+3 (TRT)
- Postal code: 51910
- Area code: 0388

Çiftehan is a resort village in Ulukışla District, Niğde Province, Turkey. Its population is 958 (2022). Before the 2013 reorganisation, it was a town (belde).

== Geography ==
Çiftehan is in the Toros Mountains at an altitude of about 1,000 m (3,300 ft), north of the main passage of the mountain system known as Cilician Gates (Turkish: Gülek Boğazı). It is 30 km (19 mi) east of Ulukışla and 80 km (50 mi) south of Niğde.

== History ==
A settlement in Cappadocia under the Roman Empire was named aquae calidae ('hot waters' after nearby thermal springs). The thermal baths were used in Roman times. The spa pools constructed by the Seljuk Turks (11th century-13th century) survive.
