= Karanlıkdere =

- Village
- Location within Turkey Location within Turkey Central Anatolia
- Coordinates: 38°00′N 34°26′E
- Country: Turkey
- Province: Niğde
- District: Bor
- Elevation: 1,480 m (4,860 ft)
- Population (2022): 563
- Time zone: UTC+3 (TRT)
- Postal code: 51700
- Area code: 0388

Karanlıkdere (formerly Asbuzu) is a village in Bor District of Niğde Province, Turkey. Its population is 563 (2022). It is situated in Melendiz Mountain. The distance to Bor is 19 kilometres (12 mi) and is 27 kilometres (17 mi) from Niğde. The settlement is probably 400 years old and was founded by seven families from the east; its original population also included a Christian minority. Between 1998 and the 2013 reorganisation, Karanlıkdere was a town (belde). the main economic activities of the town are sheep and cattle breeding, as well as carpet weaving and scrap trading.
