= Darboğaz =

Settlement in Turkey

- Village
- Location within Turkey Location within Turkey Central Anatolia
- Coordinates: 37°28′N 34°34′E
- Country: Turkey
- Province: Niğde
- District: Ulukışla
- Elevation: 1,460 m (4,790 ft)
- Population (2022): 1,479
- Time zone: UTC+3 (TRT)
- Area code: 0388

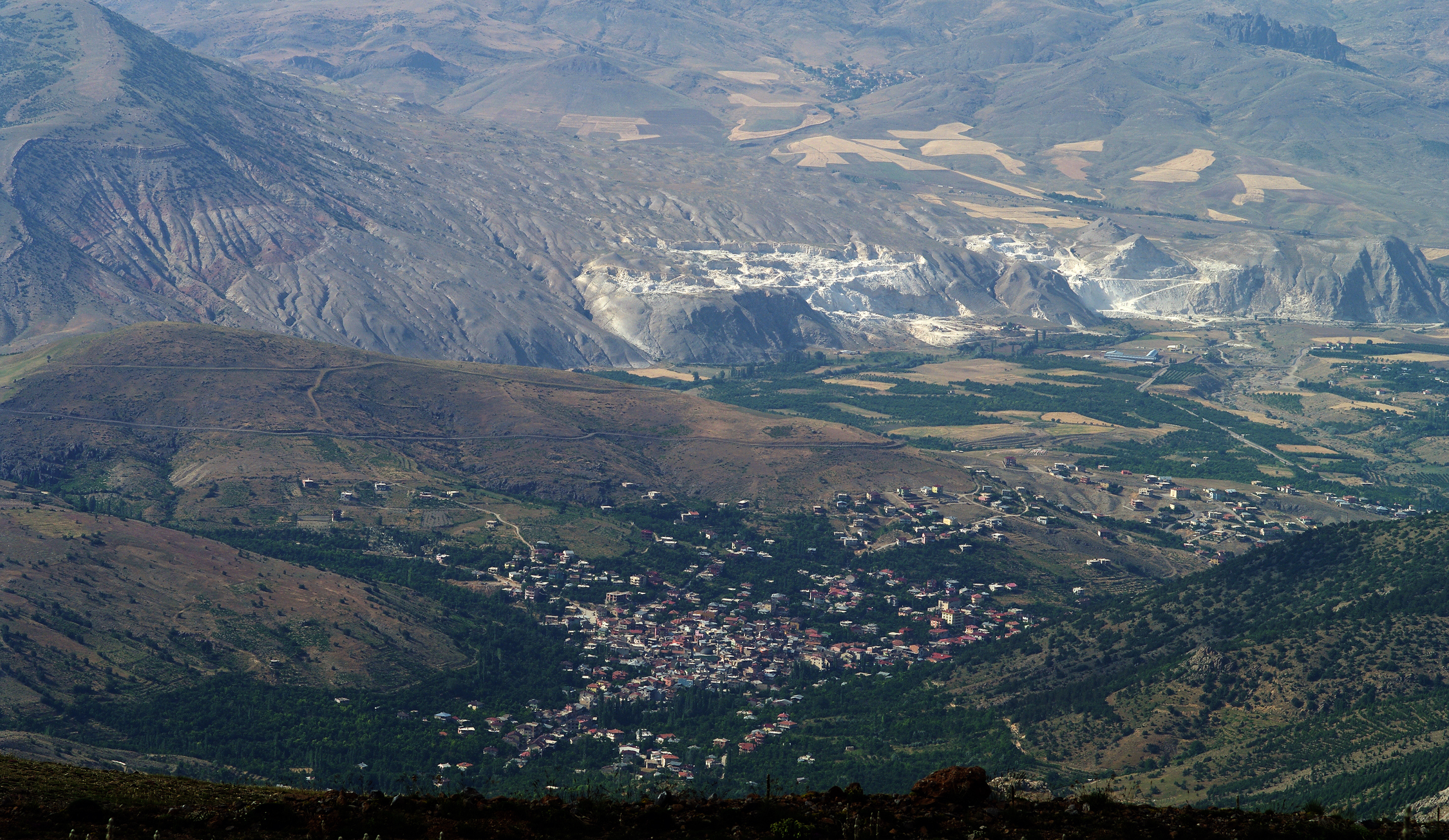

Darboğaz is a village in Ulukışla District, Niğde Province, Turkey. Its population is 1,479 (2022). Before the 2013 reorganisation, it was a town (belde).

== Geography ==
Darboğaz is a mountain town with an average altitude of 1,460 metres (4,790 ft). The highway distance to Ulukışla is 15 kilometres (9.3 mi), and to Niğde is 60 kilometres (37 mi).

== History ==
There are no written sources of the deep history of the town. The vicinity was probably inhabited during the Byzantine Empire era. The town's earliest settlers were the members of a Turkmen tribe in the 17th century. According to legend, the tribe leader was playing tar, a musical instrument, and the earliest name of the settlement was tarbaz or tar player. (The legend, if true, may show an Azerbaijani origin of the tribe.) That name may be the source of the modern name, which also means "narrow pass". Darboğaz was declared a township in 1968.

== Economy ==
The main economic activity is agriculture, especially cherry horticulture. The annual cherry production exceeds 1,500 tonnes (1,500 long tons; 1,700 short tons). Beekeeping and carpet weaving are other economic activities. Being a mountain town, the potential for winter tourism is also promising.

== Activities ==
Darboğaz has activities for different age groups. Younger residents can play football and visit local cafés. Older residents can also visit the cafés and walk in the natural areas of Darboğaz.

== See also ==
- Karagöl (Toros)
