= Bereke, Kazakhstan =

Bereke рзд.Береке
- Location in Kazakhstan
- Coordinates: 45°58′59″N 78°46′07″E
- Country: Kazakhstan
- Region: Jetisu Region
- District: Aksu District

Population (2009)
  - Total: 37
- Time zone: UTC+6 (Omsk Time)

Bereke (Kazakh: Береке, Bereke) is a village in Jetisu Region of south-eastern Kazakhstan.
