= Bahçeli, Niğde =

Bahçeli
- Municipality
- Location in Turkey Bahçeli (Turkey Central Anatolia)
- Coordinates: 37°50′N 34°37′E
- Country: Turkey
- Province: Niğde
- District: Bor
- Elevation: 1,140 m (3,740 ft)
- Population (2022): 2,179
- Time zone: UTC+3 (TRT)
- Postal code: 51710
- Area code: 0388

Bahçeli is a town (belde) in the Bor District, Niğde Province, Turkey. Its population is 2,179 (2022).

== Geography ==
Bahçeli is very close to Kemerhisar, another town in Niğde Province. Distance to Kemerhisar is 4 kilometres (2.5 mi) to Bor is 8 kilometres (5.0 mi) and to Niğde is 18 kilometres (11 mi).

== History ==
According to radiocarbon dating (^{14}C) in Köşkhöyük tumulus within Bahçeli earliest settlement in Bahçeli may be as old as 5000 BC. The nearby town Kemerhisar was a major settlement named Tyana in ancient ages and Bahçeli was a part of Tyana. The most important relic from the Roman Empire domination is a big Roman bath. After the Roman period, the settlement lost its former glory. It was a village during the Medieval ages. After 1954, it was declared township.

== Economy ==
The town economy depends on the orchards around the town. Main product is apple. Other fruits such as cherries, grapes and apricots are also produced.
