= Bereket, Bor =

Bereket
- Village
- Location within Turkey Location within Turkey Central Anatolia
- Coordinates: 37°44′N 34°33′E
- Country: Turkey
- Province: Niğde
- District: Bor
- Elevation: 1,145 m (3,757 ft)
- Population (2022): 253
- Time zone: UTC+3 (TRT)
- Postal code: 51700
- Area code: 0388

Bereket is a village in Bor District of Niğde Province, Turkey. Its population is 253 (2022). It is situated in the Central Anatolian plains on Turkish state highway D.805. Its distance to Bor is 21 kilometres (13 mi), to Niğde is 36 kilometres (22 mi).
