= Kemerhisar =

Town in Niğde, Turkey

- Municipality
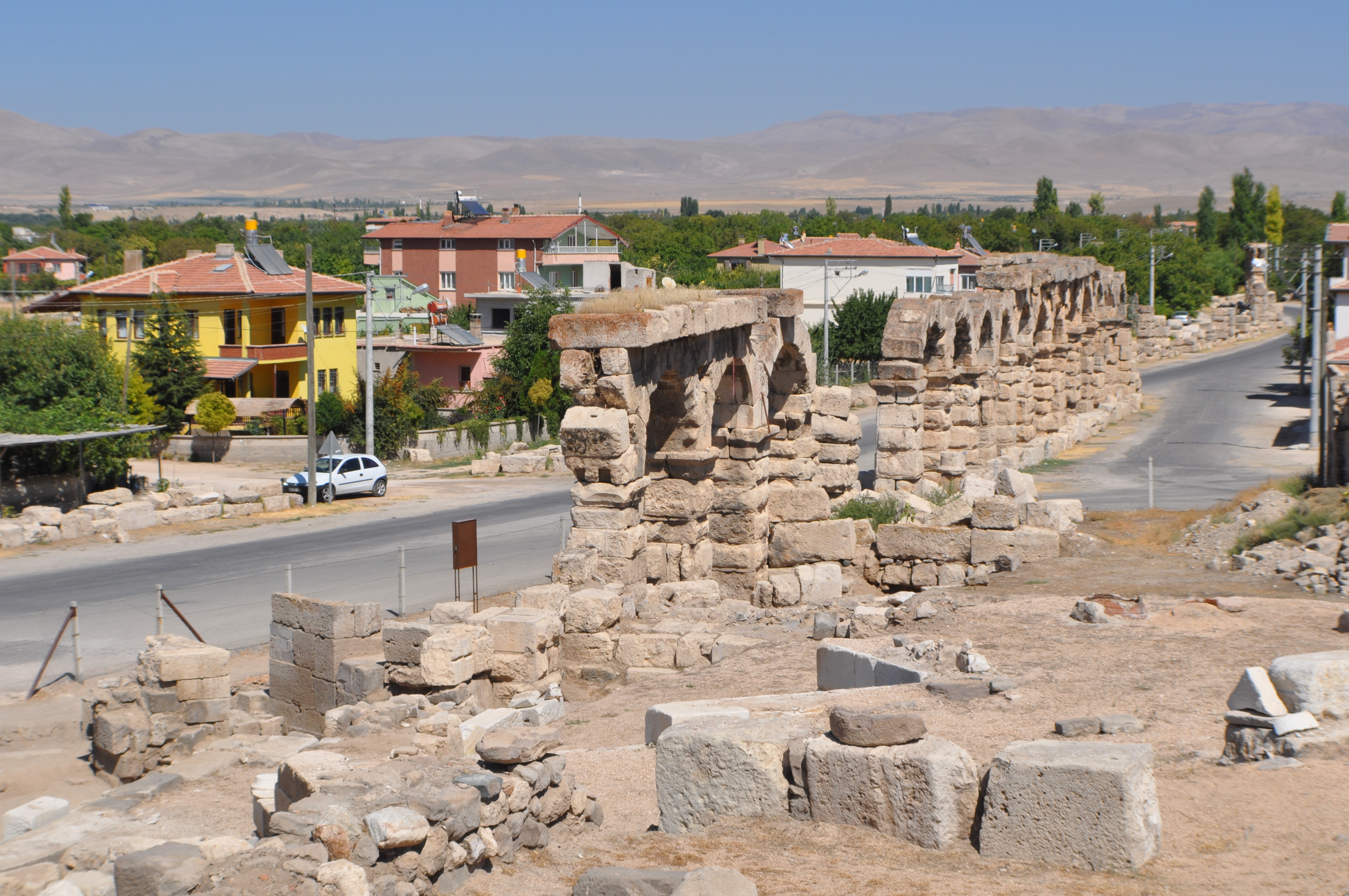
- town of Kemerhisar and ruins of Tyana

- Location within Turkey Location within Turkey Central Anatolia
- Coordinates: 37°49′28″N 34°34′15″E
- Country: Turkey
- Province: Niğde
- District: Bor

Government
  - Mayor: Ramazan Oya (CHP)
- Elevation: 1,100 m (3,600 ft)
- Population (2022): 5,463
- Time zone: UTC+3 (TRT)
- Postal code: 51730
- Area code: 0388
- Website: www.kemerhisar.bel.tr

Kemerhisar is a town (belde) in the Bor District, Niğde Province, Turkey. Its population is 5,463 (2022).

== Geography ==
The distance from Kemerhisar to Bor is 8 kilometres (5.0 mi) and to Niğde is 22 kilometres (14 mi). It is only 4 kilometres (2.5 mi) west of Bahçeli, another town of Niğde.

== History ==
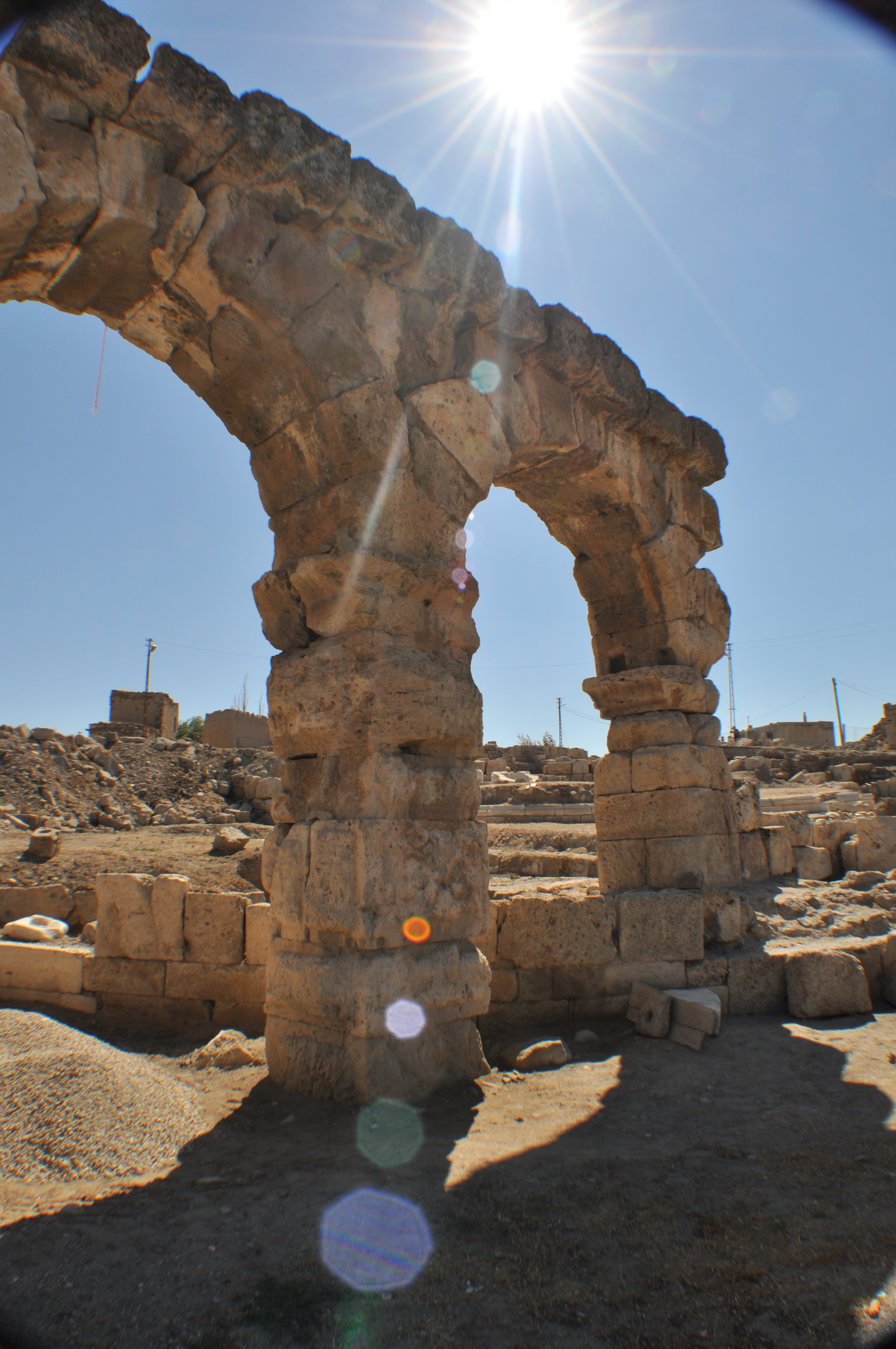
Historical Roman aqueduct

The Hittite name of Kemerhisar was Tūwanuwa. It was an important Hittite city on the way to Cilician Gates in Taurus Mountains. Then it became Tuwana, the capital of a Luwian-speaking Neo-Hittite kingdom in the 1st millennium BC. During the Hellenistic age, the name was Tyana. It was briefly the capital of Cappadocia, the vassal of Roman Empire. Apollonius of Tyana, a contemporary of Christ, was born in Tyana. The town was an important settlement during Roman Empire domination and the 1.5 kilometres (0.93 mi) aqueduct, which is the symbol of the town, had been constructed by the emperors Trajan and Hadrian. After the town was incorporated into the Seljuk Empire in the 11th century, the Turks called the city Kilisehisar (Churchfort). The name was later replaced by the name Kemerhisar (Vaultfort), referring to the historical Roman aqueduct within the town.

== Economy ==
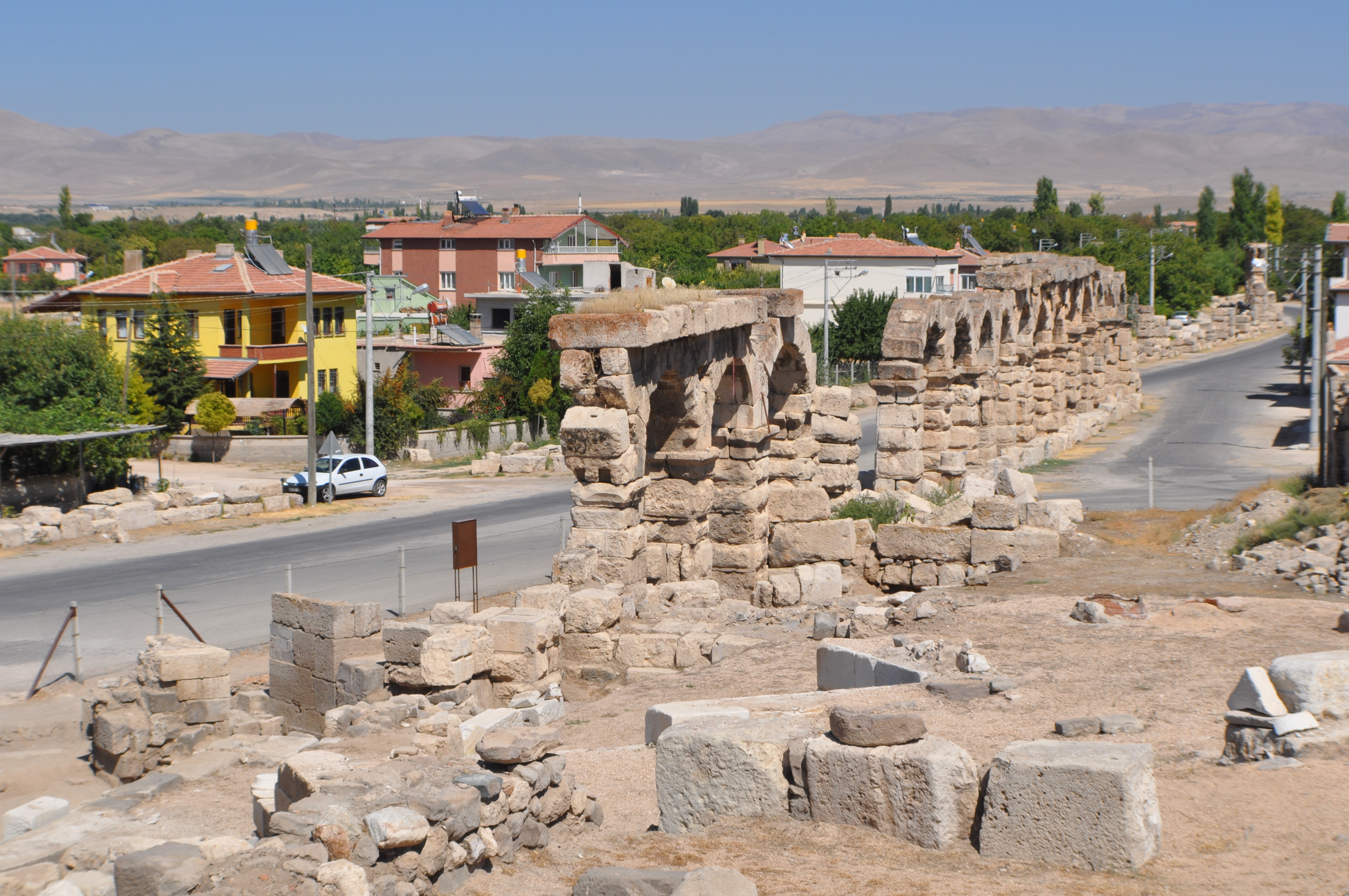
Panoramic view of the town

The main economic activity is agriculture. There are apple gardens and vineyards around the town. Onion and potato are also produced. Some Kemerhisar residents work in the sugar mill.
