= Bor, Niğde =

Bor
- Municipality
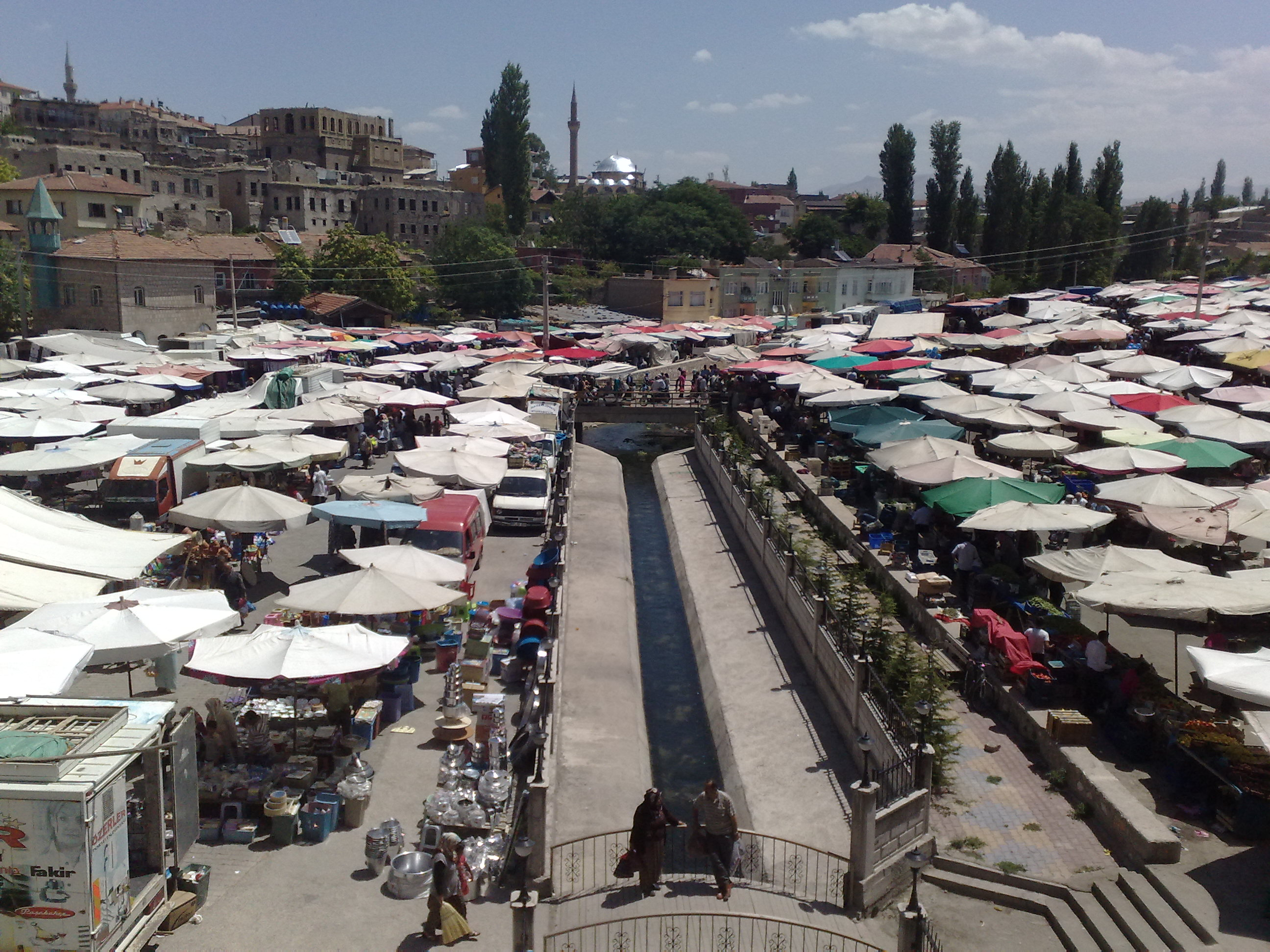
- Bor Market Place

- Location within Turkey Location within Turkey Central Anatolia
- Coordinates: 37°53′47″N 34°33′46″E
- Country: Turkey
- Province: Niğde
- District: Bor

Government
  - Mayor: Serkan Baran (AK Party)
- Elevation: 1,115 m (3,658 ft)
- Population (2022): 41,999
- Time zone: UTC+3 (TRT)
- Postal code: 51700
- Area code: 0388
- Website: www.bor.bel.tr

Bor is a town in Niğde Province in the Central Anatolia region of Turkey, 14 km (8.7 mi) to the southeast of the city of Niğde (very frequent busses run between the two), on a high plain (altitude 1,115 m (3,658 ft)). It is the seat of Bor District. Its population is 41,999 (2022).

The area is situated just north of the Taurus Mountains, not far from the Cilician Gates (Gülek Boğazı), the mountain pass leading to Cilicia and Syria, and has long been a place of commercial and military importance.

== Etymology ==
The Hittites and Assyrians gave the area the name Tuwanuwa. In the times of Cyrus the Younger and Alexander the Great it was named Dana and then by the Romans, Tyana, (Θυάνα in Ancient greek). The remains of these civilizations can be found in the village of Kemerhisar. Bor is a more modern settlement nearby.

== History ==
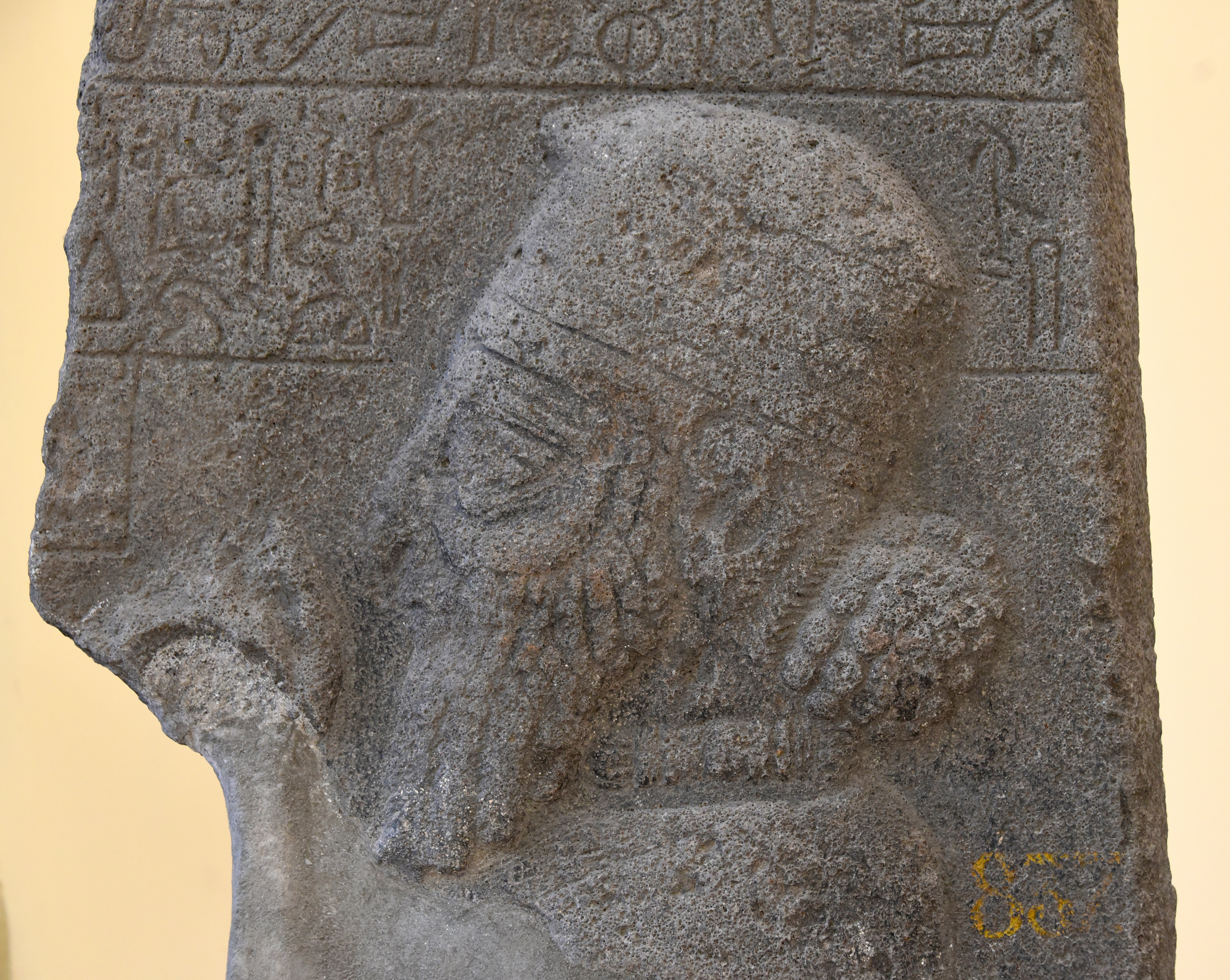
Warpalawas, king of Tyana, prays in front of divine symbols. Detail of a stele from Bor. 8th century BC. Museum of the Ancient Orient, Istanbul

The plain has been settled since the time of the Hittites, and subsequently controlled by Assyrians, Phrygians, Persians and Ancient Macedonians. The Romans (and from 395 AD onwards Byzantium) built the ancient city of Tyana the most southernmost centre of Cappadocia. During the Byzantine period the town was the eastern Mediterranean region's most important Christian centre, as indicated also by its former Turkish name of Kilisehisar (‘City of the Churches’).

Turks began to settle in the area in the wake of the Battle of Manzikert after 1071. In the course of time the fortifications of ancient Tyana vanished among the towns of Bor, Kemerhisar and Bahçeli.

Today the economy of Bor depends on grazing animals, plus some carpet weaving and leather-making. The countryside is too dry for planting crops, although there are vineyards and orchards (mainly apple and apricot) in Kemerhisar. This is a relatively poor district and many people have migrated to Europe or the larger cities of Turkey in search of jobs.

== Places of interest ==
- Alâeddin Bey (Ulu Cami) Mosque - on the riverbank in the town centre.
- Şeyh İlyas or Kale Camii - 16th century Ottoman mosque.
- The rocks where the Hittites worshipped the storms gods, in the village of Gökbez.
- The ruins of Tyana (ancient Tuvanuva, Dana, Tyana) and a number of Roman waterways scattered over three hills between the villages of Bahçeli and Kemerhisar. These include the remains of a complex of Roman baths (Roma Hamamı) and a limestone aqueduct dated from the reign of Caracalla (211-217 A.D.). The original supply of the aqueduct, the monumental pool of Bahçeli (Roma Havuzu, 5.5 km NE) is still well preserved. It sits at the foot of Köşk Höyük, a Hittite settlement excavated in 1981 that is turning out to be of great historical value. There are also other massive foundations of several large buildings, shafts, pillars, and one handsome column (replaced) still standing.
- The mineral water and therapeutic mud-baths just south of Kemerhisar. The hot spring (15 °C) mentioned in ancient writings still bubbles into a cold swamp. The mineral water is drunk for its healing powers and the site (İçmeler) also includes a bathing pool.

== Gallery ==
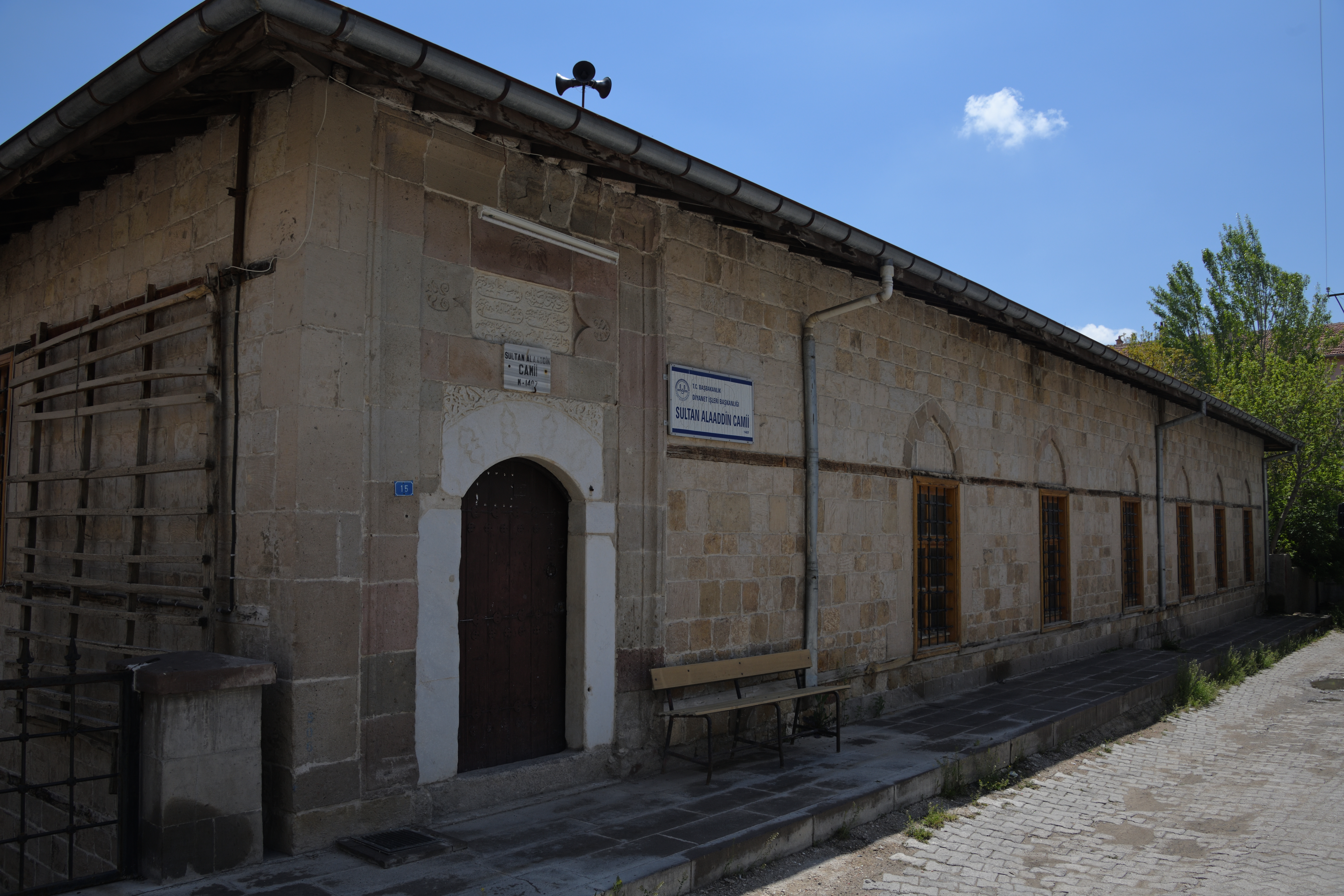
Bor Sultan Alaaddin Mosque

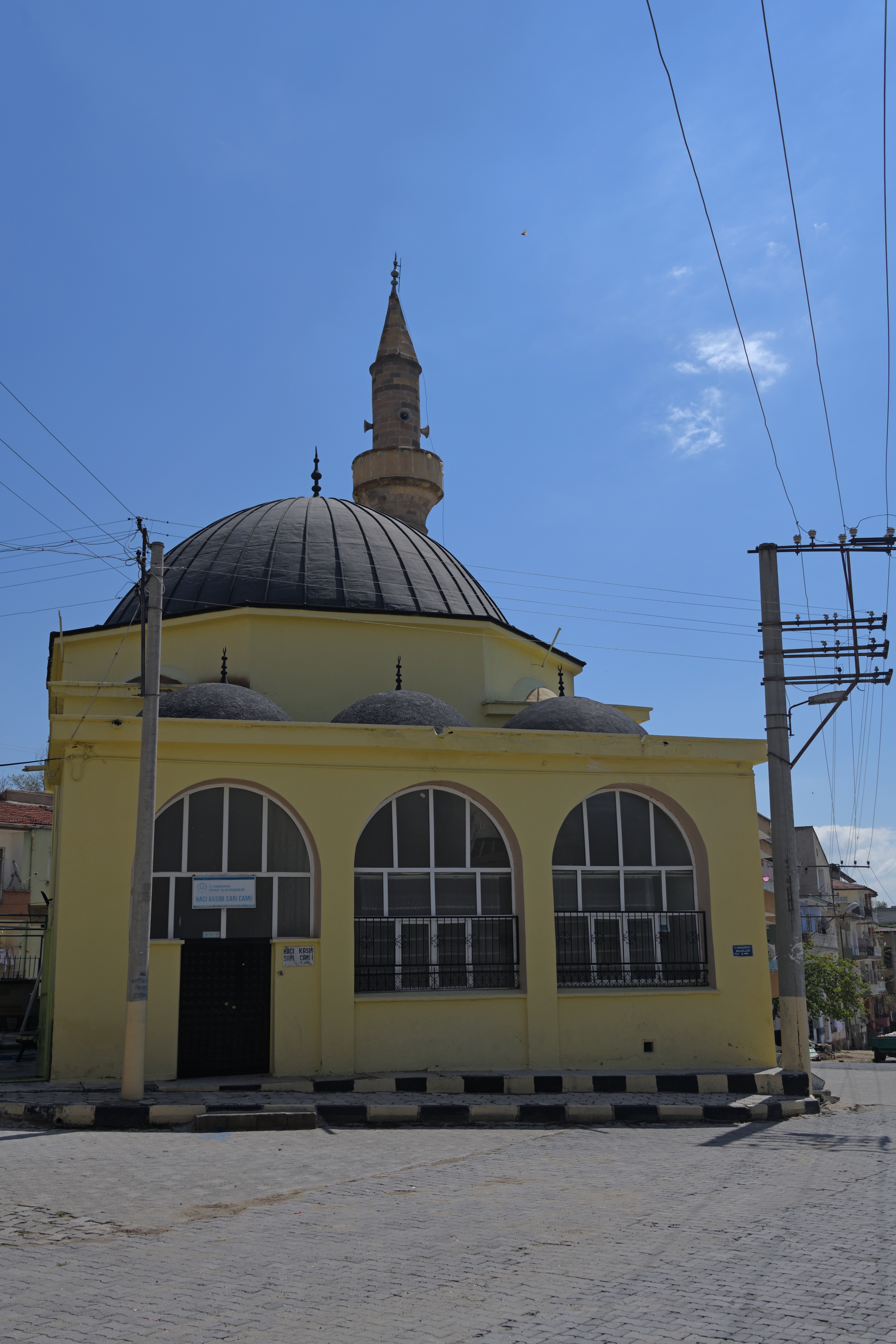
Bor Haci Kasim Sari Mosque

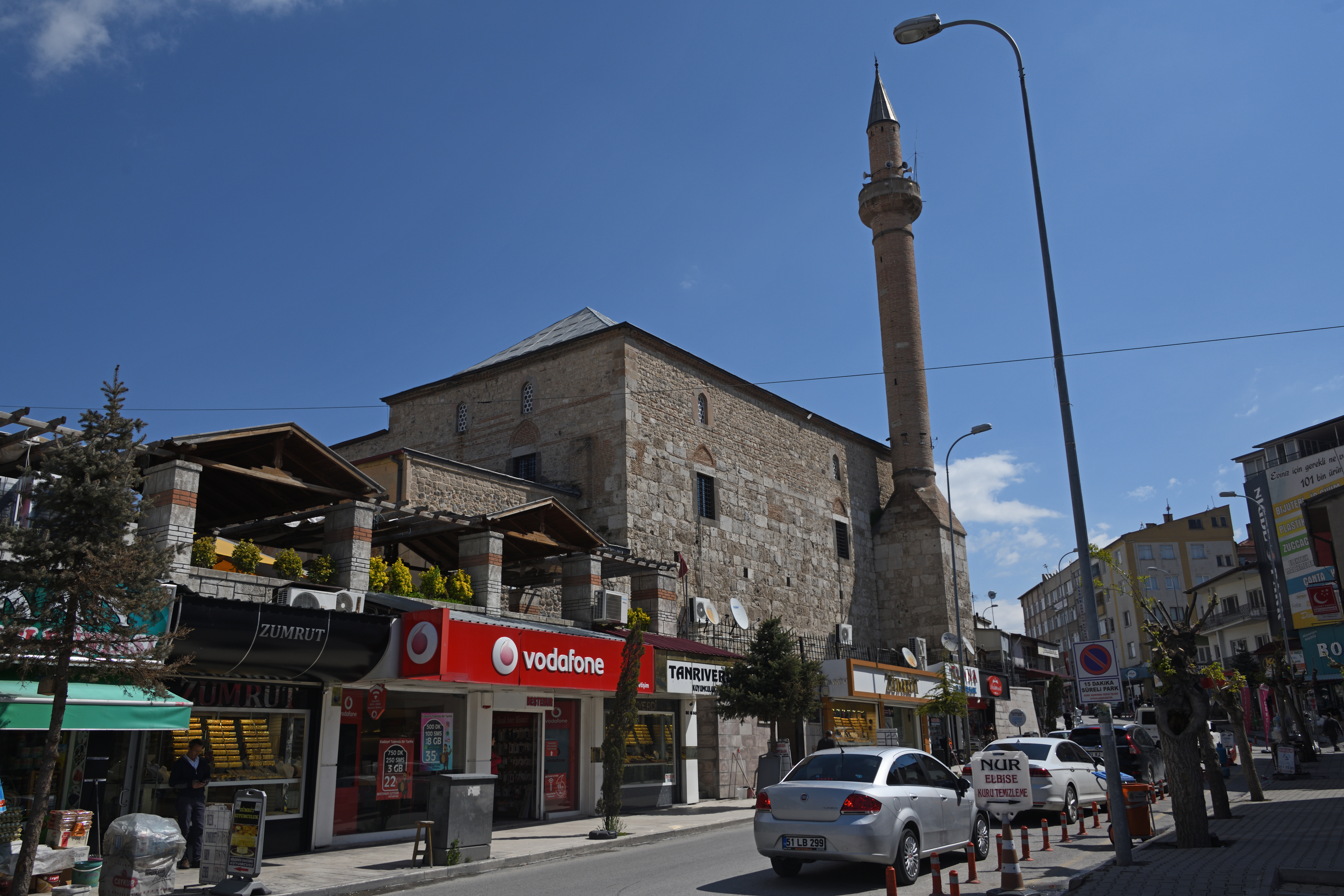
Bor Sokullu Mehmet Pasha Mosque

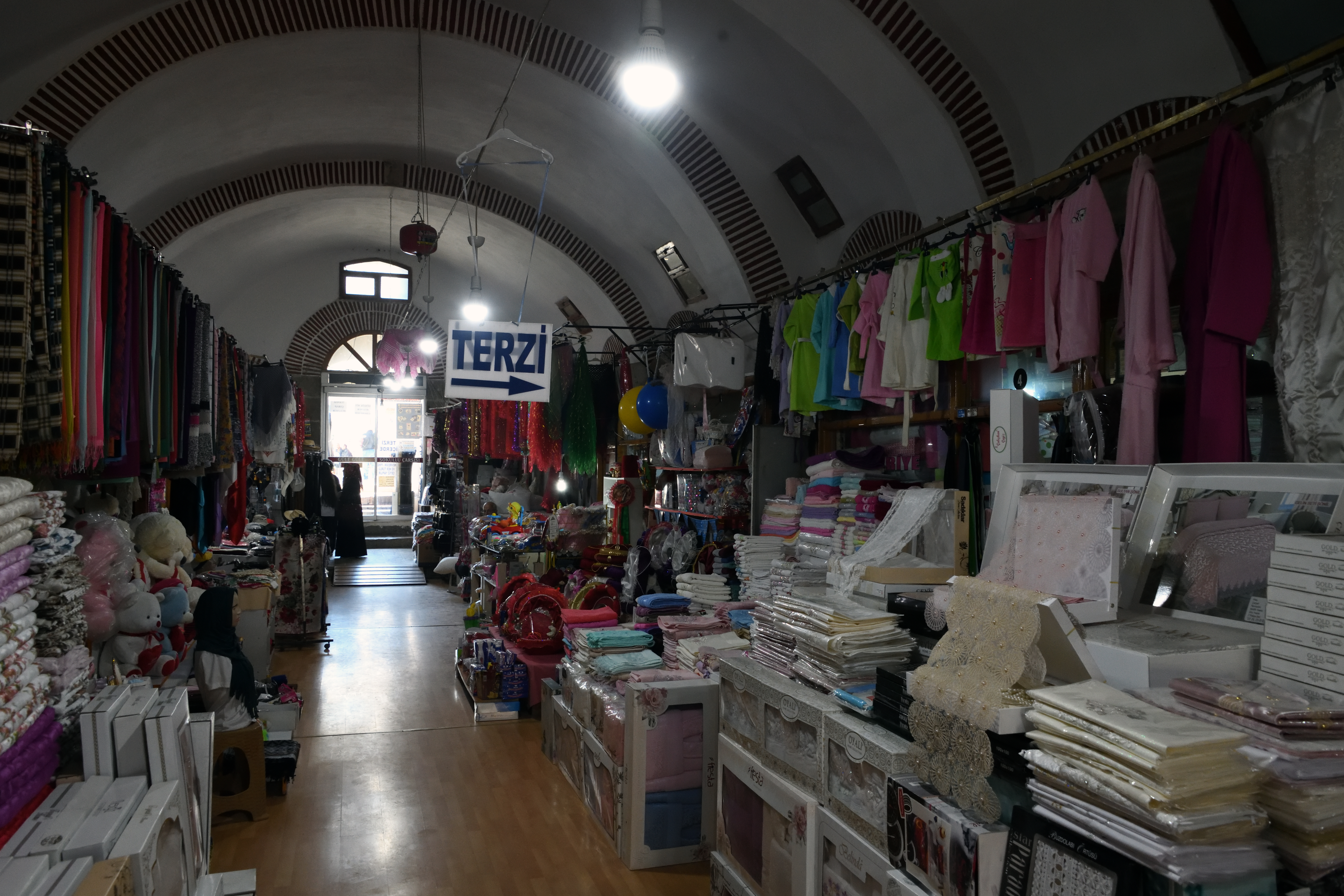
Bor Sokullu çarşısı

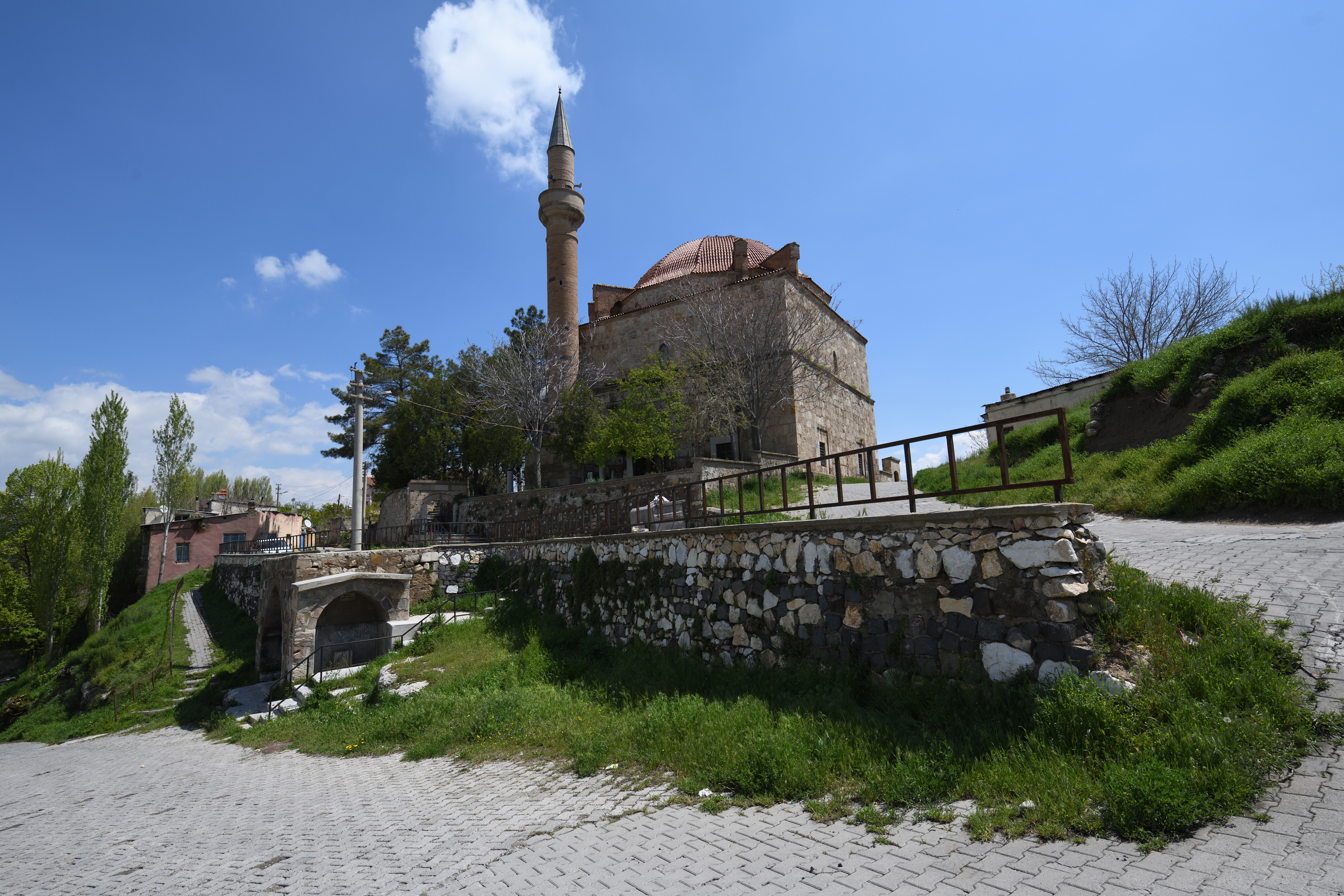
Bor Seyh Ilyas (Kale) Mosque

Bor Old Hamam

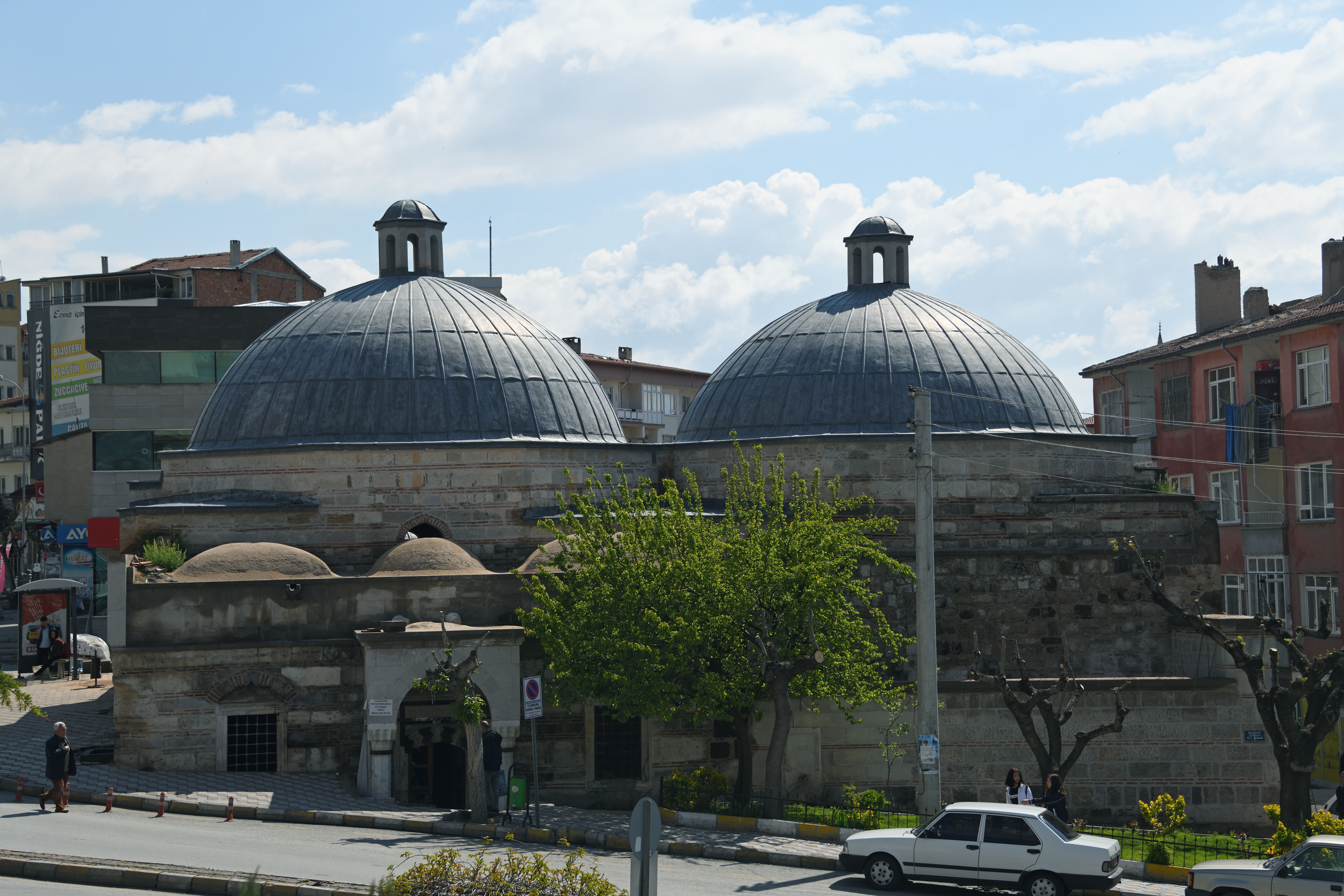
Bor Erkekler Hamam

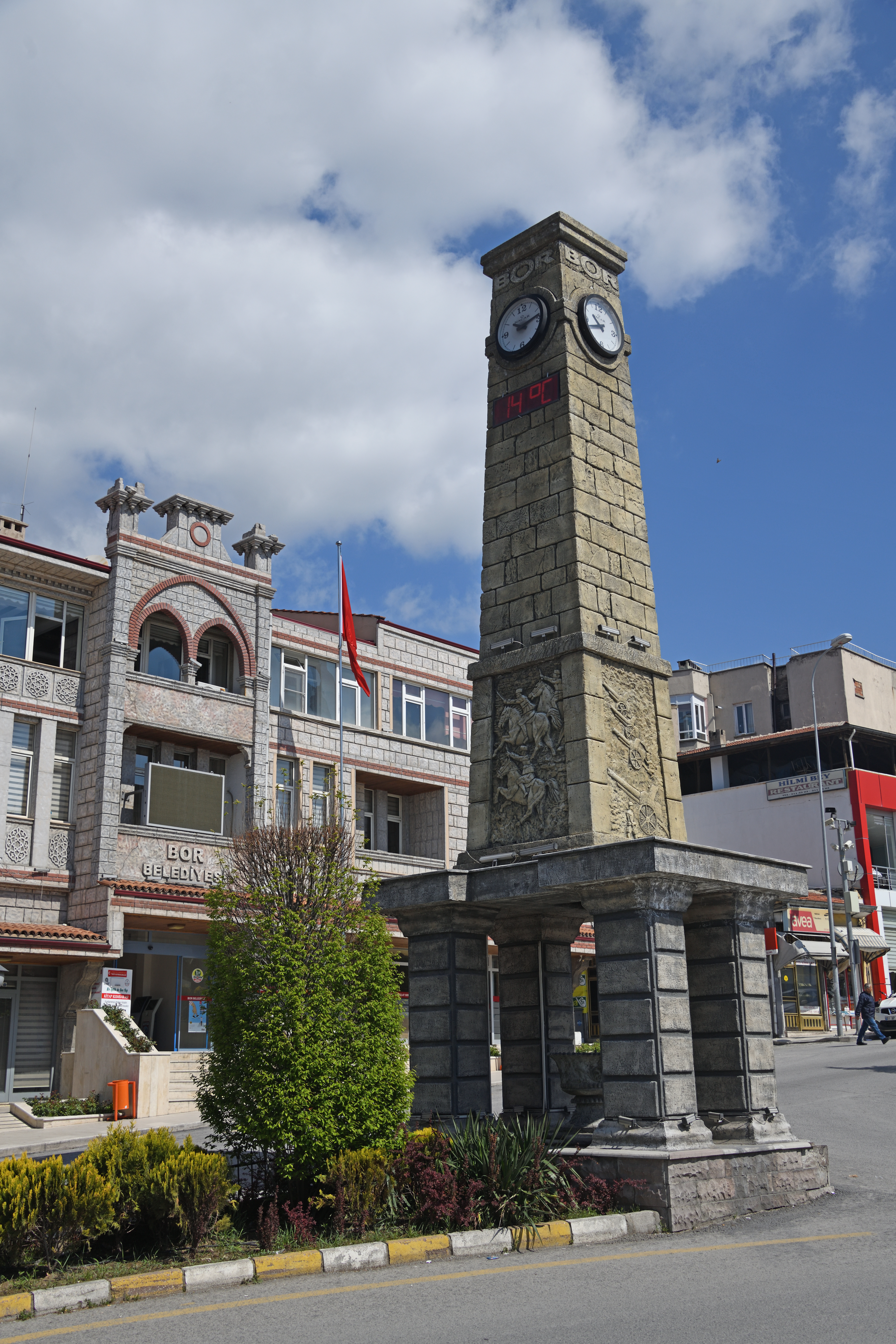
Bor Clock Tower

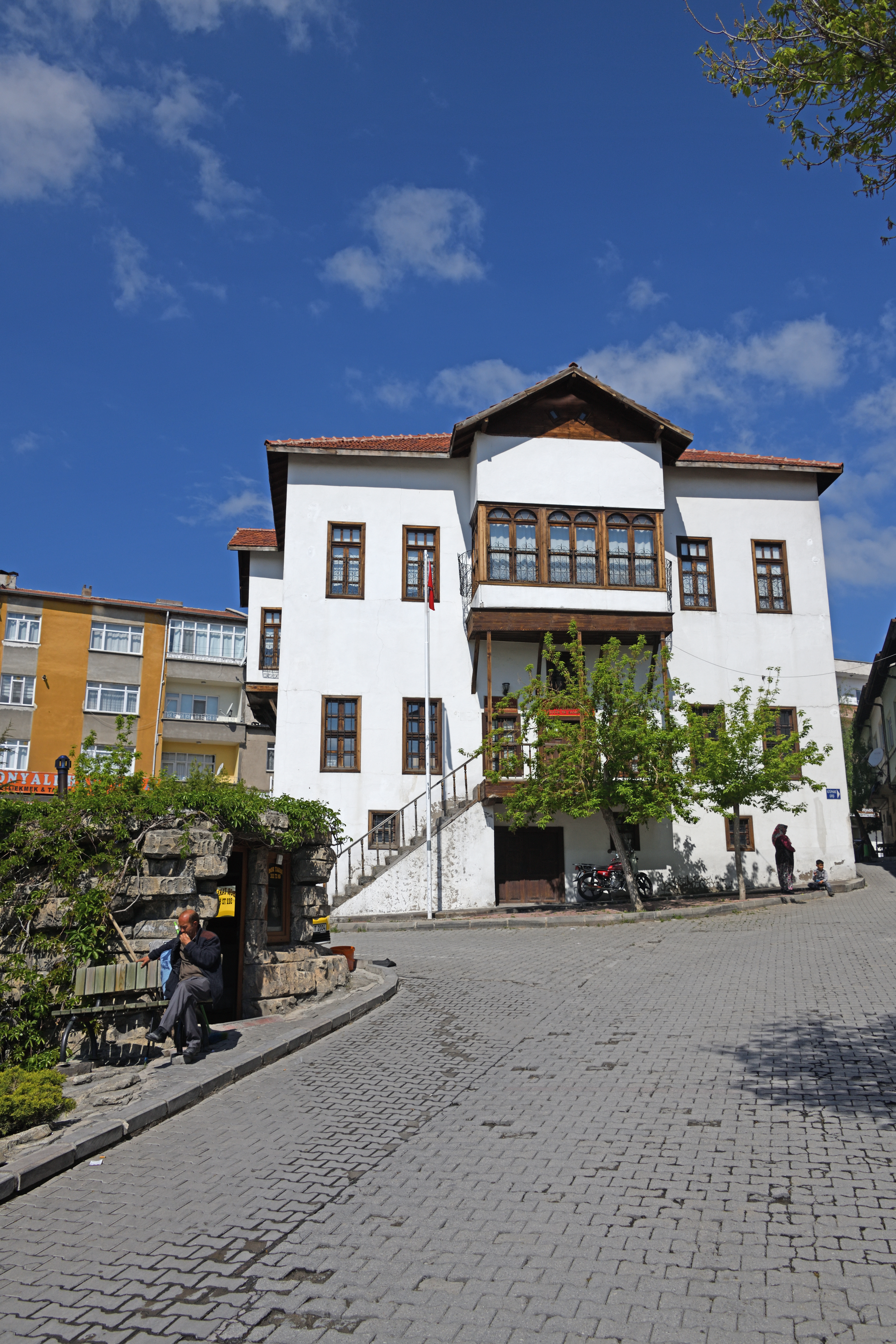
Bor Bilgin cultural centre

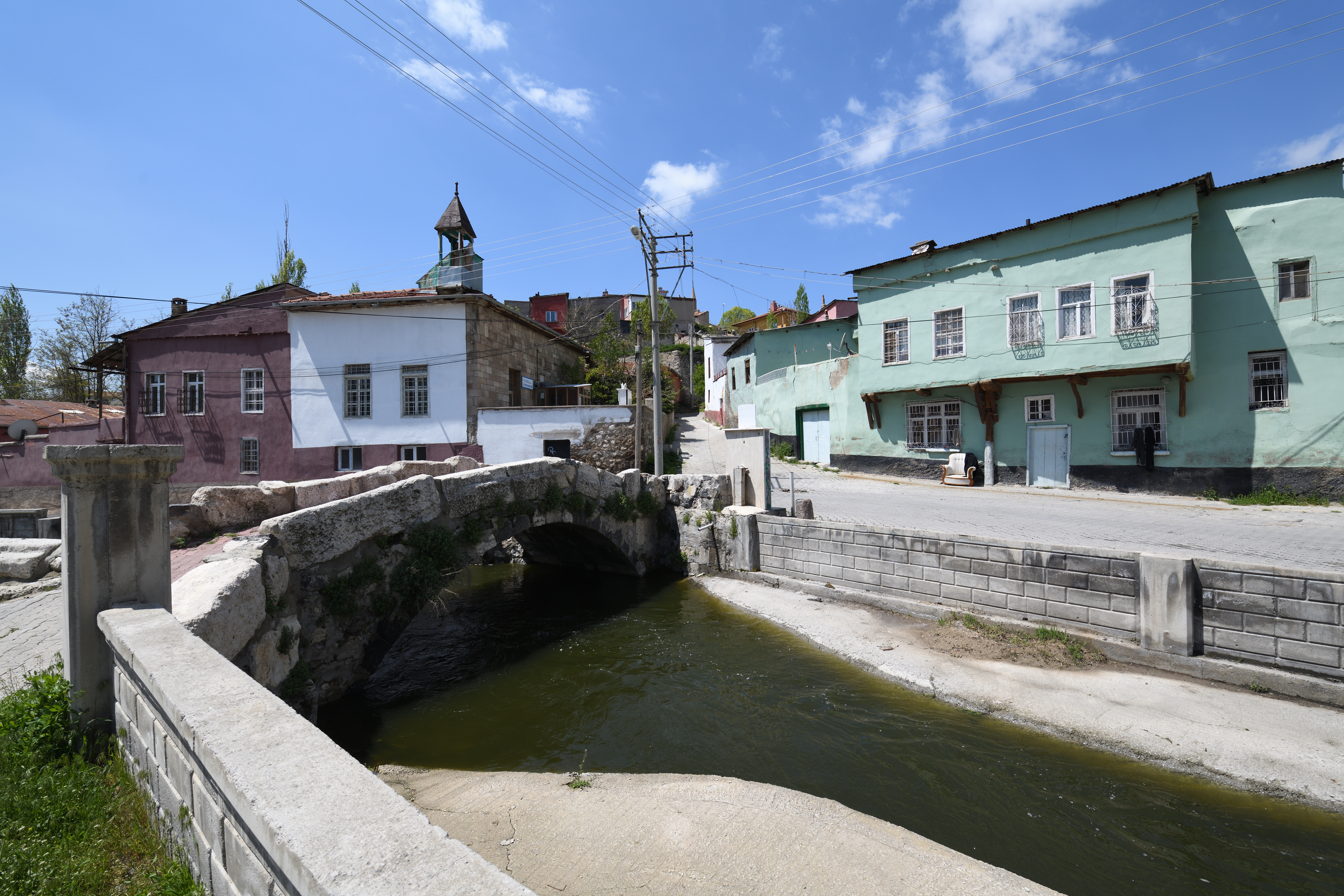
Bor View

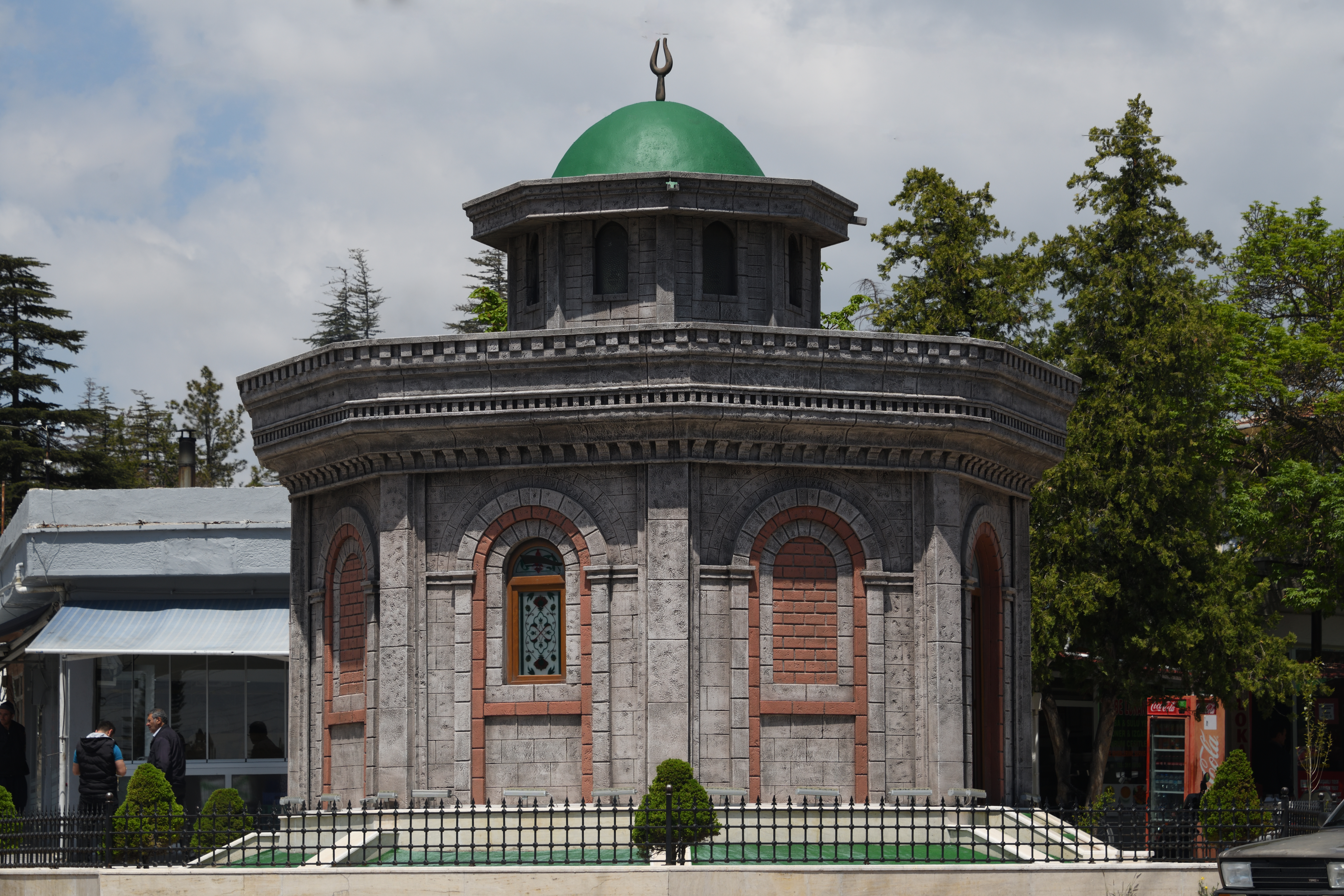
Bor Ahmet Kuddusi Hazreti mausoleum
