= List of municipalities in Niğde Province =

This is the List of municipalities in Niğde Province, Turkey as of March 2023.

District	Municipality
Altunhisar	Altunhisar
Altunhisar	Karakapı
Altunhisar	Keçikalesi
Bor	Bahçeli
Bor	Bor
Bor	Çukurkuyu
Bor	Kemerhisar
Çamardı	Çamardı
Çiftlik	Azatlı
Çiftlik	Bozköy
Çiftlik	Çiftlik
Çiftlik	Divarlı
Niğde	Aktaş
Niğde	Alay
Niğde	Bağlama
Niğde	Değirmenli
Niğde	Dündarlı
Niğde	Edikli
Niğde	Gümüşler
Niğde	Hacıabdullah
Niğde	Karaatlı
Niğde	Kiledere
Niğde	Konaklı
Niğde	Niğde
Niğde	Orhanlı
Niğde	Sazlıca
Niğde	Yeşilgölcük
Niğde	Yıldıztepe
Ulukışla	Ulukışla
