= Gümüşler =

Gümüşler (literally "silvers") is a Turkish word that may refer to the following places in Turkey:

- Gümüşler, Niğde, a town in Niğde Province
  - Gümüşler Monastery, in the town
  - Gümüşler Dam, near the town
- Gümüşler, Yenice

== See also ==
- Gümüş (disambiguation), "silver"
