= Gümüşköy =

Gümüşköy (literally "silver village") is a Turkish place name that may refer to the following places in Turkey:

- Gümüşköy, Germencik, a village in the district of Germencik, Aydın Province
  - Gümüşköy Geothermal Power Plant, in the village
  - Gümüşköy mine, near the village

== See also ==
- Gümüş (disambiguation), "silver"
