= Kitreli =

- Village
- Location within Turkey Location within Turkey Central Anatolia
- Coordinates: 38°10′N 34°21′EKlepper
- Country: Turkey
- Province: Niğde
- District: Çiftlik
- Elevation: 1,600 m (5,200 ft)
- Population (2022): 1,188
- Time zone: UTC+3 (TRT)
- Postal code: 51820
- Area code: 0388

Kitreli is a village in Çiftlik District of Niğde Province, Turkey. Its population is 1,188 (2022). Before the 2013 reorganisation, it was a town (belde). It is situated in a high peneplain at 1,600 m (5,200 ft) elevation. The distance to Çiftlik is 15 kilometres (9.3 mi) and to Niğde is 87 kilometres (54 mi). (Aksaray, the capital of the next province is closer to Kitreli than Niğde). The name Kitreli refers to tragacanth (Turkish: kitre) a natural gum, produced around the town. The settlement was founded two centuries ago by a group of families from Aksaray or Altunhisar. In 1953 it was declared a seat of township. Main economic sector is agriculture. Cereal, potato and sunflower are the main products. Although there are also apple gardens (like most other places in Niğde Province) irrigation facilities are not sufficient for a large scale production. Dairying and weaving are secondary activities.
