= Gümüşgöze =

Gümüşgöze (literally "silver to the eye") is a Turkish place name that may refer to the following places in Turkey:

- Gümüşgöze, Alanya, a village in the district of Alanya, Antalya Province
- Gümüşgöze, Gündoğmuş, a village in the district of Gündoğmuş, Antalya Province
- Gümüşgöze, Kelkit, a town in the district of Kelkit, Gümüşhane Province

== See also ==
- Gümüş (disambiguation), "silver"
