= Gümüş =

Gümüş is the Turkic word for "silver." It may refer to:

== People ==
- Ali Gümüş (1940-2015) Turkish sports journalist and the president of the World Wrestling Journalists Association (AIPS)
- Emine Gümüş (born 1992), Turkish women's footballer
- Esra Gümüş (born 1982), Turkish female volleyball player
- Ferit Gümüş (born 1981), Turkish wheelchair basketball player and Paralympian
- Serdar Gümüş (born 1956), Turkish carom and artistic billiards player
- Sinan Gümüş (born 1994), Turkish-German footballer

== Places ==
- Gümüş, Acıpayam, a neighborhood in Acıpayam district of Denizli Province, Turkey

== Medya ==
- Gümüş (TV series), a Turkish soap opera

== See also ==
- Gümüşdamla (disambiguation)
- Gümüşdere (disambiguation)
- Gümüşgöze (disambiguation)
- Gümüşhane (disambiguation)
- Gümüşlü (disambiguation)
- Gümüşler (disambiguation)
- Gümüşkavak (disambiguation)
- Gümüşköy (disambiguation)
- Gümüşsu (disambiguation)
- Gümüşyaka (disambiguation)
