= Gümüşlü =

Gümüşlü (literally "(place) with silver") is a Turkic name that may refer to:

== Places ==
=== Azerbaijan ===
- Gümüşlü, Sharur, a village and municipality in the Sharur District of Nakhchivan Autonomous Republic

=== Turkey ===
- Gümüşlü, Besni, a village in the district of Besni, Adıyaman Province
- Gümüşlü, Korkuteli, a village in the district of Korkuteli, Antalya Province
- Gümüşlük, a seaside village and fishing port in the district of Bodrum, Muğla Province

== See also ==
- Gümüş (disambiguation), the Turkish word for "silver"
