= Çiftlik District =

District of Niğde Province, Turkey

- District
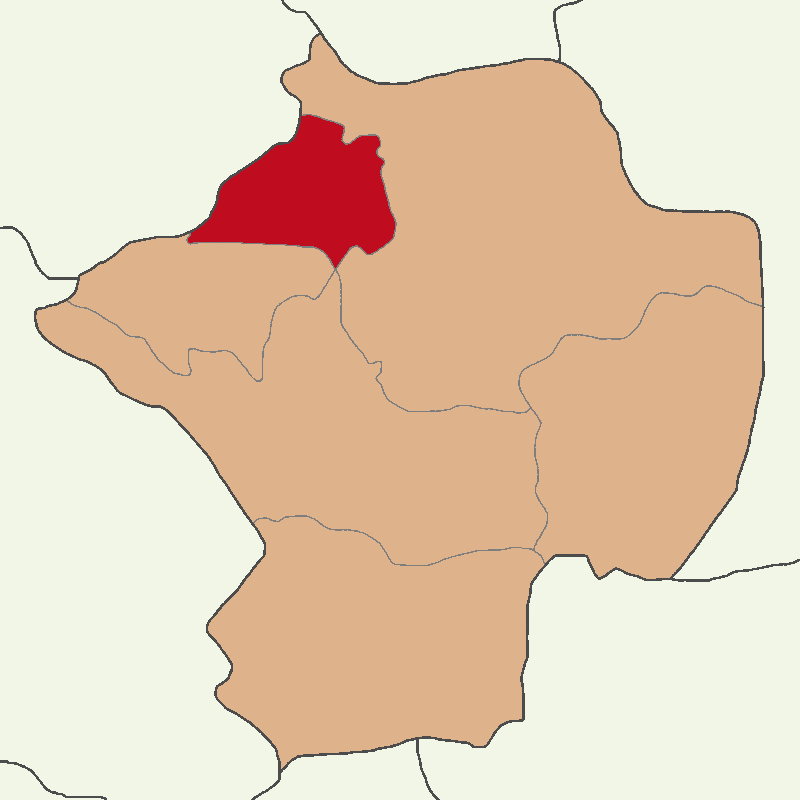
- Map showing Çiftlik District in Niğde Province

- Location in Turkey Çiftlik District (Turkey Central Anatolia)
- Coordinates: 38°10′N 34°29′E
- Country: Turkey
- Province: Niğde
- Seat: Çiftlik

Government
  - Kaymakam: Volkan Oral
- Area: 400 km^{2} (200 sq mi)
- Population (2022): 25,642
  - Density: 64/km^{2} (170/sq mi)
- Time zone: UTC+3 (TRT)
- Website: www.ciftlik.gov.tr

Çiftlik District is a district of the Niğde Province of Turkey. Its seat is the town of Çiftlik. Its area is 400 km^{2}, and its population is 25,642 (2022).

== Composition ==
There are four municipalities in Çiftlik District:

- Azatlı
- Bozköy
- Çiftlik
- Divarlı

There are 9 villages in Çiftlik District:

- Çardak
- Çınarlı
- Kitreli
- Kula
- Mahmutlu
- Murtazaköy
- Ovalıbağ
- Şeyhler
- Sultanpınarı
