= Gümüşdamla =

Gümüşdamla (literally "silver drop") is a Turkish place name that may refer to the following places in Turkey:

- Gümüşdamla, Akseki, a village in the district of Akseki, Antalya Province
- Gümüşdamla, Aydıntepe, a village in the district of Aydıntepe, Bayburt Province

== See also ==
- Gümüş (disambiguation), "silver"
