= Dikilitaş, Niğde =

Dikilitaş
- Village
- Location within Turkey Location within Turkey Central Anatolia
- Coordinates: 38°07′N 35°05′E
- Country: Turkey
- Province: Niğde
- District: Niğde
- Elevation: 1,485 m (4,872 ft)
- Population (2022): 708
- Time zone: UTC+3 (TRT)
- Postal code: 51000
- Area code: 0388

Dikilitaş (former Enehil) is a village in the Niğde District of Niğde Province, Turkey. Its population is 708 (2022). Before the 2013 reorganisation, it was a town (belde). Dikilitaş is situated to the northeast of Niğde. Distance to Niğde is 48 kilometres (30 mi).

The former population of Dikilitaş was composed of Karamanlides and Muslim Turks. (Karamanlides was a Turkish-speaking Orthodox Christian community.) According to Ottoman documents, there were 200 Karamanlides and 80 Muslim Turkish families. In 1924, as result of Population exchange between Greece and Turkey agreement Karamanlides were replaced by Muslim Turks from Greece.
