= Keçikalesi =

- Municipality
- Location in Turkey Keçikalesi (Turkey Central Anatolia)
- Coordinates: 38°03′40″N 34°07′16″E
- Country: Turkey
- Province: Niğde
- District: Altunhisar
- Elevation: 1,325 m (4,347 ft)
- Population (2022): 1,703
- Time zone: UTC+3 (TRT)
- Postal code: 51604
- Area code: 0388

Keçikalesi is a town (belde) in the Altunhisar District, Niğde Province, Turkey. Its population is 1,703 (2022). Its distance to Altunhisar is 30 kilometres (19 mi) and to Niğde is 70 kilometres (43 mi). It was declared a seat of township in 1989.
