= Karakapı =

- Municipality
- Location within Turkey Location within Turkey Central Anatolia
- Coordinates: 38°04′N 34°10′E
- Country: Turkey
- Province: Niğde
- District: Altunhisar
- Elevation: 1,400 m (4,600 ft)
- Population (2022): 2,425
- Time zone: UTC+3 (TRT)
- Postal code: 51603
- Area code: 0388

Karakapı, possibly known in antiquity as Mysthia (Μυσθεία in Ancient Greek) or Mysty, is a town (belde) in the Altunhisar District, Niğde Province, Turkey. Its population is 2,425 (2022). The town is situated in the Central Anatolian plains to the south of Hasandağı volcano. The distance to Altunhisar is 20 kilometres (12 mi). The town was captured by Seljuk Turks during the reign of Suleyman I of Rum in the second half of the 11th century. After the rule of Karamanids, it was captured by the Ottomans in the 15th century during the reign of Mehmet II. In 1999 the settlement was declared a seat of township. The town economy depends on dry agriculture. Some Karakapı citizens work in services in the cities.
