= Gümüşyaka =

Gümüşyaka (literally "silver side") is a Turkish place name that may refer to the following places in Turkey:

- Gümüşyaka, Elmalı, a village in the district of Elmalı, Antalya Province
- Gümüşyaka, Polatlı, a village in the district of Polatlı, Ankara Province

== See also ==
- Gümüş (disambiguation), "silver"
