= Gösterli =

- Village
- Location within Turkey Location within Turkey Central Anatolia
- Coordinates: 38°20′N 34°29′E
- Country: Turkey
- Province: Niğde
- District: Niğde

Government
  - Muhtar: Mustafa Ozcelik
- Elevation: 1,100 m (3,600 ft)
- Population (2022): 914
- Time zone: UTC+3 (TRT)
- Postal code: 51070
- Area code: 0388

Gösterli is a village in Niğde District of Niğde Province, Turkey. Its population is 914 (2022). It is in the South-West part of historical Cappadocia.
