= Narköy, Niğde =

Narköy
- Village
- Location within Turkey Location within Turkey Central Anatolia
- Coordinates: 38°19′35″N 34°26′49″E
- Country: Turkey
- Province: Niğde
- District: Niğde
- Elevation: 1,450 m (4,760 ft)
- Population (2022): 164
- Time zone: UTC+3 (TRT)
- Area code: 0388

Narköy, formerly known as Nêroassós or Narassa, is a village in the Niğde District of Niğde Province, Turkey. Its population is 164 (2022).

Its altitude is 1,450 metres (4,760 ft). Its distance to Niğde is 83 kilometres (52 mi). The name of the village refers to Lake Narlı to the northeast of the village. Ancient cave dwellings and ruins around the village and the lake show that the area was inhabited in the medieval age.

The economy of the village depends on agriculture. Wheat, barley, oat, chickpea and bean are among the main crops of the village. There are poplar trees and orchards around the village. Fruits like apple, pear and apricot are also produced. Apiculture is on the rise.
