= Gümüşsu =

Gümüşsu (literally "silver water") is a Turkish place name that may refer to the following places in Turkey:

- Gümüşsu, Bayburt, a village in the district of Bayburt, Bayburt Province
- Gümüşsu, Çivril
- Gümüşsu, Simav, a town in the district of Simav, Kütahya Province

== See also ==
- Gümüş (disambiguation), "silver"
