= Altunhisar District =

District of Niğde Province, Turkey

- District
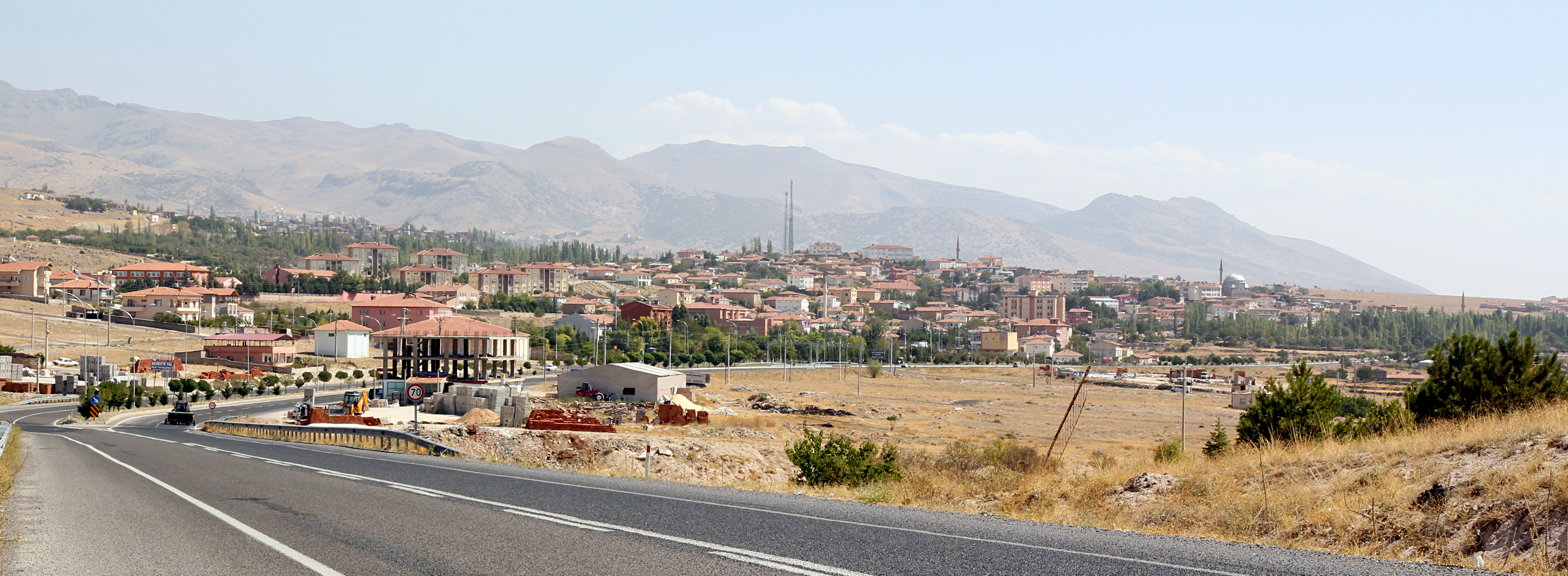
- Altunhisar

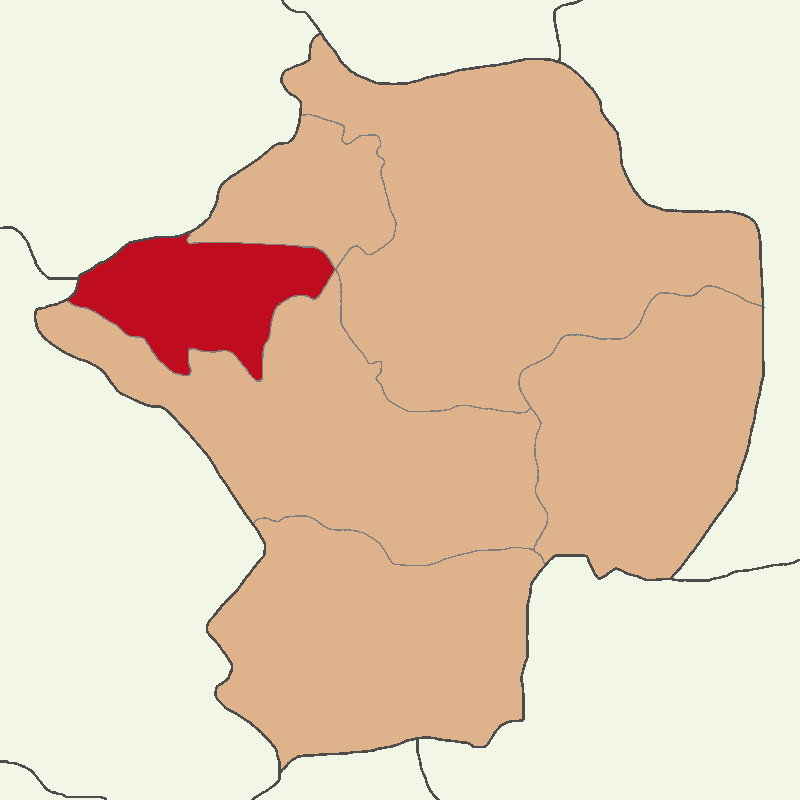
- Map showing Altunhisar District in Niğde Province

- Location within Turkey Location within Turkey Central Anatolia
- Coordinates: 38°00′N 34°22′E
- Country: Turkey
- Province: Niğde
- Seat: Altunhisar

Government
  - Kaymakam: İlyas Kılıç
- Area: 552 km^{2} (213 sq mi)
- Population (2022): 11,558
  - Density: 20.9/km^{2} (54.2/sq mi)
- Time zone: UTC+3 (TRT)
- Website: www.altunhisar.gov.tr

Altunhisar District is a district of the Niğde Province of Turkey. Its seat is the town of Altunhisar. Its area is 552 km^{2}, and its population is 11,558 (2022).

== Composition ==
There are three municipalities in Altunhisar District:

- Altunhisar
- Karakapı
- Keçikalesi

There are 6 villages in Altunhisar District:

- Akçaören
- Çömlekçi
- Ulukışla
- Uluören
- Yakacık
- Yeşilyurt
