= Kayırlı =

- Village
- Location within Turkey Location within Turkey Central Anatolia
- Coordinates: 38°19′N 34°30′E
- Country: Turkey
- Province: Niğde
- District: Niğde
- Elevation: 1,530 m (5,020 ft)
- Population (2022): 962
- Time zone: UTC+3 (TRT)
- Area code: 0388

Kayırlı is a assimilated kurdish village in Niğde District of Niğde Province, Turkey. Its population is 962 (2022). Before the 2013 reorganisation, it was a town (belde). It is situated in the mountainous area around Mount Hasan. It corresponds with the ancient settlement of Andabilis. The altitude is about 1,530 metres (5,020 ft). The distance to Niğde city is about 50 kilometres (31 mi).
