= Gümüşdere =

Gümüşdere (literally "silver creek") is a Turkish place name that may refer to the following places in Turkey:

- Gümüşdere, Hopa, a village in the district of Hopa, Artvin Province
- Gümüşdere, Pazaryeri, a village in the district of Pazaryeri, Bilecik Province
- Gümüşdere, Tavas

== See also ==
- Gümüş (disambiguation), "silver"
