= Niğde District =

District of Niğde Province, Turkey

- District
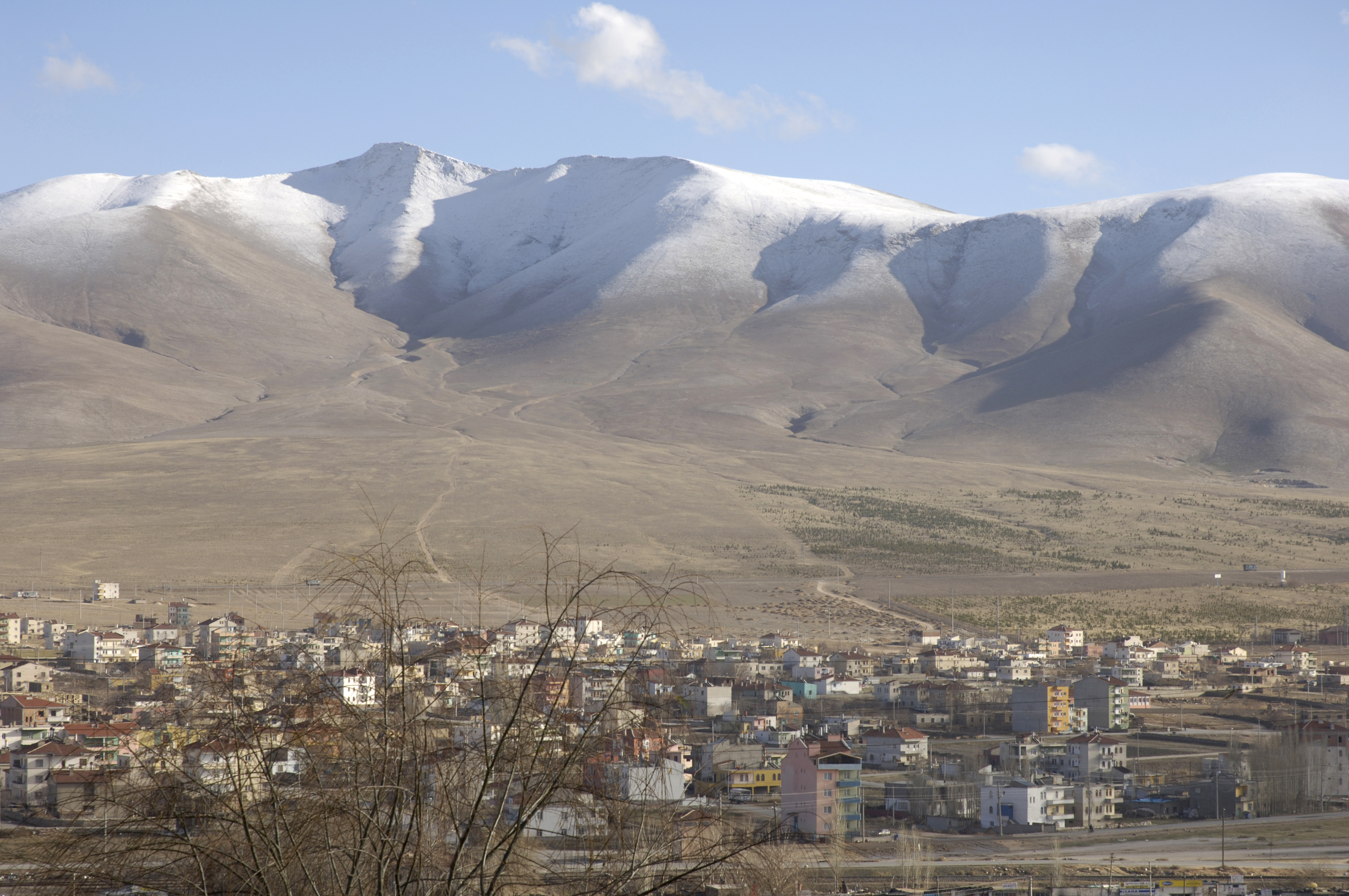
- looking toward the countryside from the town of Niğde

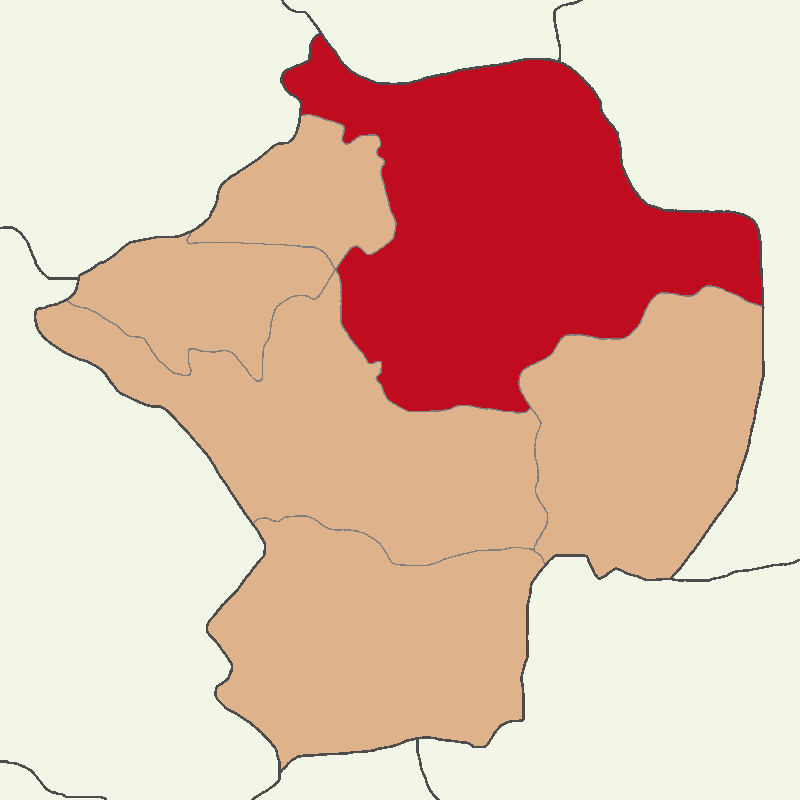
- Map showing Niğde District in Niğde Province

- Location within Turkey Location within Turkey Central Anatolia
- Coordinates: 37°58′N 34°41′E
- Country: Turkey
- Province: Niğde
- Seat: Niğde
- Area: 2,223 km^{2} (858 sq mi)
- Population (2022): 236,793
  - Density: 106.5/km^{2} (275.9/sq mi)
- Time zone: UTC+3 (TRT)

Niğde District (also: Merkez, meaning "central" in Turkish) is a district of the Niğde Province of Turkey. Its seat is the city of Niğde. Its area is 2,223 km^{2}, and its population is 236,793 (2022).

== Composition ==
There are 16 municipalities in Niğde District:

- Aktaş
- Alay
- Bağlama
- Değirmenli
- Dündarlı
- Edikli
- Gümüşler
- Hacıabdullah
- Karaatlı
- Kiledere
- Konaklı
- Niğde
- Orhanlı
- Sazlıca
- Yeşilgölcük
- Yıldıztepe

There are 34 villages in Niğde District:

- Ağcaşar
- Aşlama
- Ballı
- Çarıklı
- Çavdarlı
- Çayırlı
- Dikilitaş
- Elmalı
- Fesleğen
- Gösterli
- Güllüce
- Hacıbeyli
- Hançerli
- Hasaköy
- Himmetli
- İçmeli
- Kayırlı
- Kırkpınar
- Kızılören
- Kömürcü
- Koyunlu
- Küçükköy
- Narköy
- Ovacık
- Özyurt
- Pınarcık
- Taşlıca
- Tepeköy
- Tırhan
- Uluağaç
- Yarhisar
- Yaylayolu
- Yeşilburç
- Yeşilova
