= Yeşilburç =

- Village
- Location within Turkey Location within Turkey Central Anatolia
- Coordinates: 38°01′N 34°40′E
- Country: Turkey
- Province: Niğde
- District: Niğde
- Elevation: 1,400 m (4,600 ft)
- Population (2022): 464
- Time zone: UTC+3 (TRT)
- Postal code: 51000
- Area code: 0388

Yeşilburç (former Teney, Greek: Γιεσίλμπουρτς) is a village in Niğde District of Niğde Province, Turkey. Its population is 464 (2022).

== Geography ==
Yeşilburç is 5 kilometres (3.1 mi) north of Niğde and 5 kilometres (3.1 mi) south of Gebere Dam. Situated in a high valley, it is surrounded by fruit gardens.

== History ==
Yeşilburç was a Karamanlides village; i.e., the residents were Turkish speakers of Orthodox Christian faith. During the compulsory population exchange between Greece and Turkey (Turkish: mübadele) in 1920s, they were deported to Greece just like the other Greeks. In Greece they were settled in Corfu island (in Ionian Sea, west of Greece). Meanwhile Vallahades from the village of Kivotos (Turkish: Krifçe) in Grevena (north Greece) who were deported from Greece came to Turkey to find a new home. They were settled in Yeşilburç in 1926.

== Economy ==
Fruits are the main products of Yeşilburç. The village is especially specialised in apple production. The touristic potential is also high for there are many historical buildings (from Karamanlides) in the village. But at the present tourism plays no role in the village economy
