= Gümüşkavak =

Gümüşkavak (literally "silver poplar") is a Turkish place name that may refer to the following places in Turkey:

- Gümüşkavak, Alanya, a village in the district of Alanya, Antalya Province
- Gümüşkavak, Posof, a village in the district of Posof, Ardahan Province

== See also ==
- Gümüş (disambiguation), "silver"
