= Hançerli, Niğde =

Village in Turkey

Hançerli is a former Karamanlides village, famous for its Dermason beans. The village, officially a neighborhood, is in the Niğde district of Niğde province in central Turkey. It is 9 kilometers from the capital of the province, and its population is 294.

== Name ==
The village has been known by many names, many of them similar to each other. It is listed as Dilmuson in official Ottoman records from the years 1500, 1518, and 1530. The village's name is listed as Dylmusun or Termissos in an early 20th-century catalog of archeological sites in southern Asia Minor, as Τελμησσός, Τελμησός, Ντελμισσόν, Ντελμοσό, Hancereli, or Dulmucum in a study of late 19th- and early 20th-century migrants or refugees, and as Τερμισσός in a late 19th-century study of Cappadocian monasteries. Its name is listed as Dilmisson or ديلميصون in a Turkish Interior Ministry report in 1928, but as Hançerli in a 1957 geographical study.

== History ==
The village flourished economically from 1839 to 1870 as a center of cotton trade in Cilicia.

In 1920, the population of the village included 1045 Karamanlides and 1283 Muslims. In the Population Exchange of 1923, the Karamanlides of the village were sent to Greece while 176 Muslims from Kastoria and Chroupista in Greece were settled in the village.

== Local sights ==
In the village center is an old church, the former Analepsis Monastery; it was built in 1832, constructed of cut basalt on a basilica plan, but is now used as a mosque. Before the construction of this building, the village's parish church was a cave church dedicated to the Archangel Michael.

Within the village are three historic fountains (çeşmeler), one with an inscription in Greek and Karamanli and the date 1832. Also in the village is an old washery (yunak) or laundry building (çamaşırhane).

To the northeast of the village are the ruins of the Koimesis of the Theotokos Monastery.

== Local products ==
The village is known for the Dermason variety of beans, registered for protected geographical indication by the Niğde Chamber of Commerce and Industry. The beans are defined as "white in color, with a somewhat plump but flat (oblate) shape, one edge straight and the other edge rounded, and generally large in size."
