= Gümüşlü, Sharur =

Gümüşlü
- Municipality
- Location within Azerbaijan
- Coordinates: 39°38′44″N 45°05′12″E
- Country: Azerbaijan
- Autonomous republic: Nakhchivan
- District: Sharur

Population (2005)
  - Total: 489
- Time zone: UTC+4 (AZT)

Gümüşlü (also, Gyumyushlu) is a village and municipality in the Sharur District of Nakhchivan Autonomous Republic, Azerbaijan. It is located 20 km in the north-east from the district center, on the left bank of the Arpachay River, on the slope of the Daralayaz ridge. The settlement was built near of the Gümüşlü Polymetallic Reserve (1954). Its population is busy with farming and animal husbandry. There are secondary school, library, club and a medical center in the village. It has a population of 489. Arpaçay reservoir is in the territory of the village. In the north of the village, on the slope of the mountain ridge down to Arpachay River was found the settlement of the Dəvəli of the Middle Ages.
