= Gümüşgöze, Alanya =

Gümüşgöze
- Neighbourhood
- Location in Turkey
- Coordinates: 36°40′57″N 31°56′32″E
- Country: Turkey
- Province: Antalya
- District: Alanya
- Population (2022): 192
- Time zone: UTC+3 (TRT)

Gümüşgöze is a neighbourhood in the municipality and district of Alanya, Antalya Province, Turkey. Its population is 192 (2022). In 2001 it passed from the Gündoğmuş District to the Alanya District.
