= Sazlıca =

- Municipality
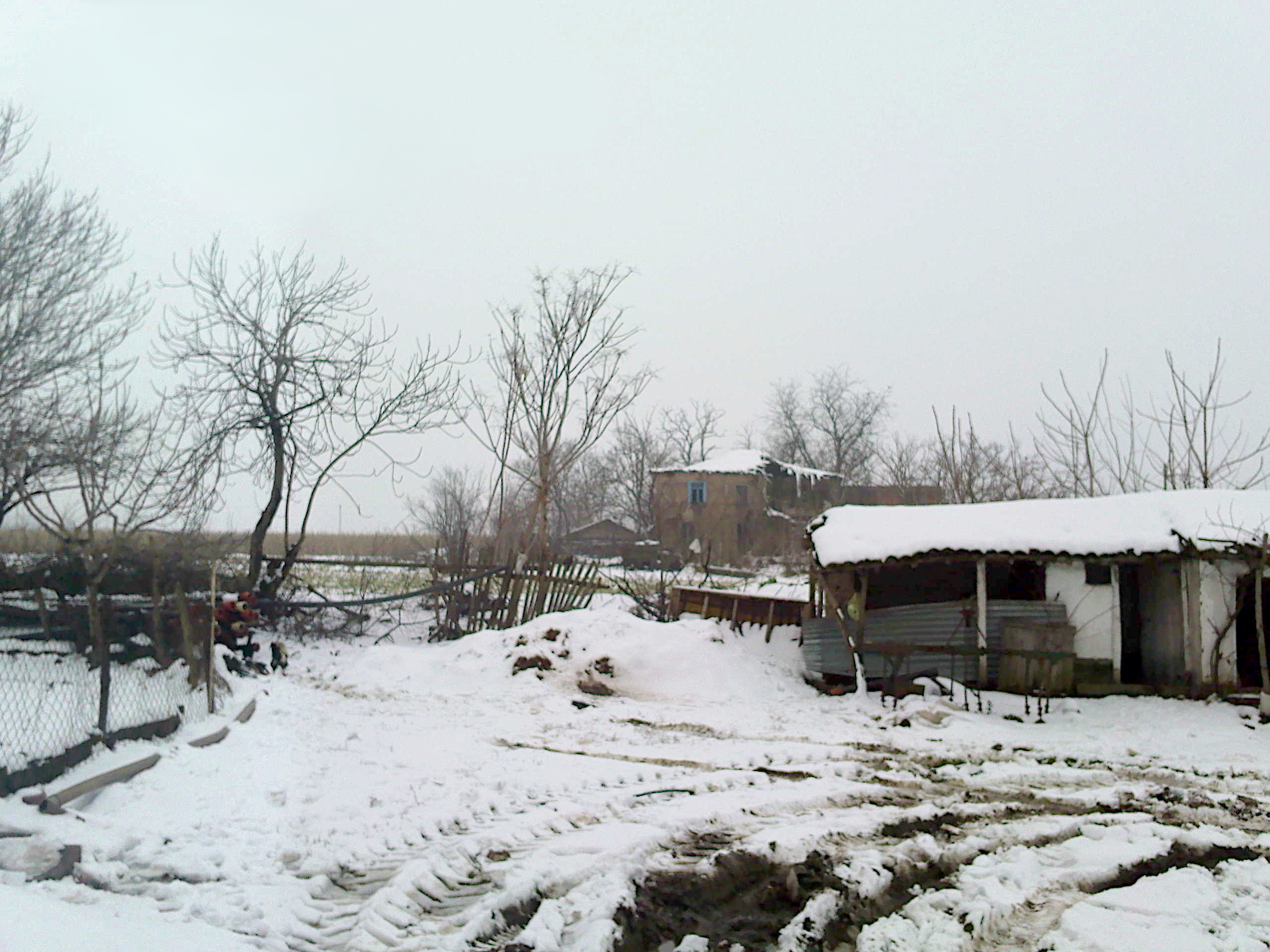
- Sazlıca in the snow

- Location within Turkey Location within Turkey Central Anatolia
- Coordinates: 37°54′N 34°38′E
- Country: Turkey
- Province: Niğde
- District: Niğde
- Elevation: 1,210 m (3,970 ft)
- Population (2022): 3,898
- Time zone: UTC+3 (TRT)
- Postal code: 51000
- Area code: 0388

Sazlıca is a town (belde) in the Niğde District, Niğde Province, Turkey. Its population is 3,898 (2022). It is on the Turkish state highway D.805 which connects Niğde to Çukurova (Adana, Mersin etc.) It is only 8 kilometres (5.0 mi) south of Niğde. Although very close to Niğde, the town is not merged to city because a semiopen prison is situated just between the town and Niğde. However lately some Niğde residents began to build summer houses around Sazlıca. Like most towns around main economic activity of the town is agriculture.
