= Gümüşköy mine =

- Location: Kütahya Province, Turkey
- Products: silver

The Gümüşköy mine is a large silver mine located in the west of Turkey in Kütahya Province. Gümüşköy represents one of the largest silver reserve in Turkey and in the world having estimated reserves of 640 million oz of silver.
