= Gümüşler Monastery =

Cave monastery in Turkey

Coordinates: 37.996656°N 34.771210°E

Eski Gümüşler Monastery
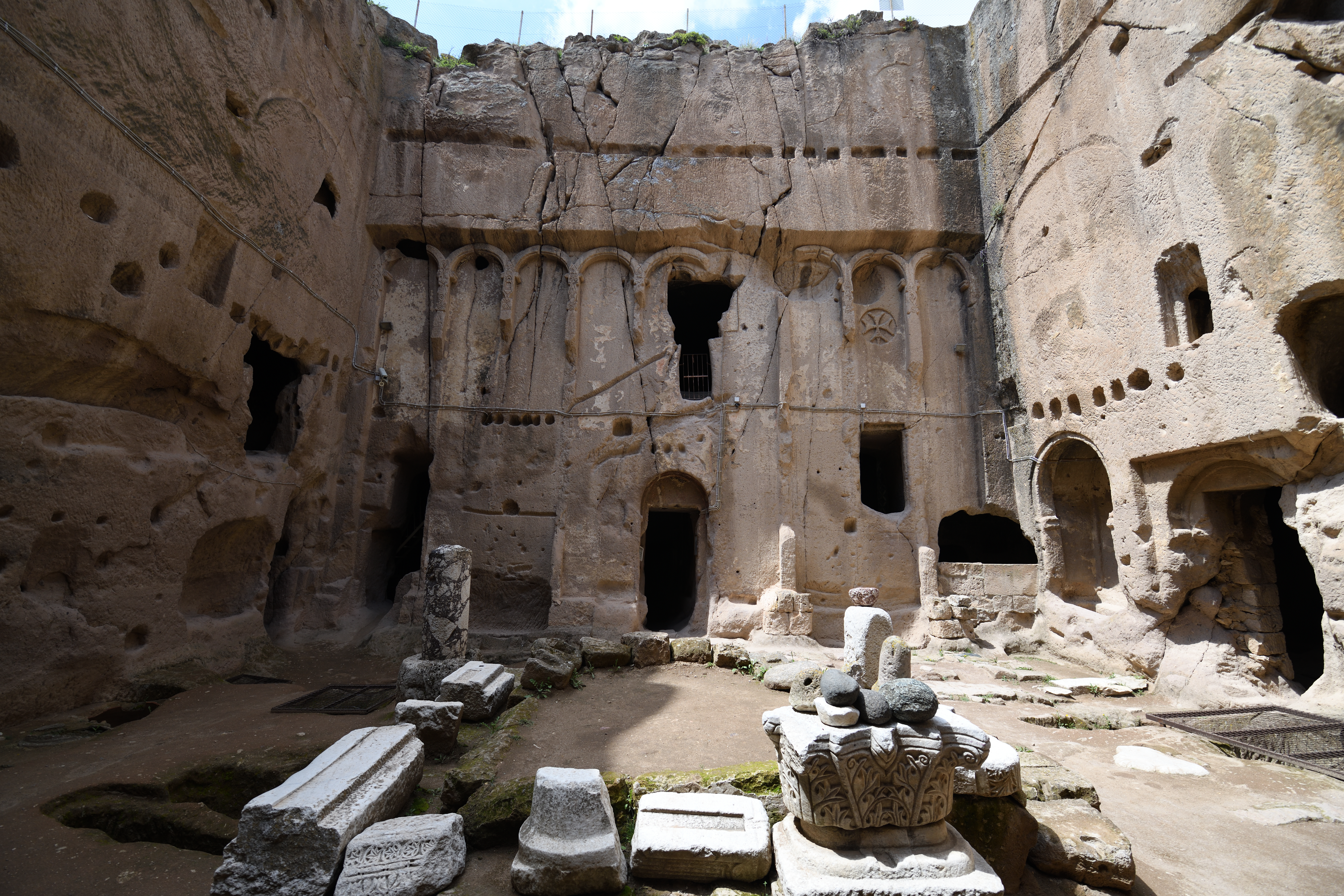
- Gumusler Monastery Courtyard
- Interactive map of Eski Gümüşler Monastery

Site
- Location: Niğde Province, Turkey
- Public access: Public access all year round

Eski Gümüşler or ''Old Silver' Monastery is a Byzantine-era cave monastery in the small town of Gümüşler, 10km northeast of Niğde town in Niğde province, Turkey. Built in the 10th century AD, it was in use until the Greco-Turkish population exchange in 1924. It is easily accessible by bus from Niğde.

After its rediscovery in 1962, the monastery and its frescoes were restored by a team of archaeologists led by Michael Gough. It was declared a protected archaeological site in 1973.

== History ==
The history of the settlement. The monastery and the underground settlement were built in the 10th century away from the major settlements; At that time it was called "Trakias".

== Description ==
The monastery is carved out of a large stretch of rock and is one of the best preserved and largest of its kind in the Cappadocia region. Scholars divide Cappadocia's many rock-cut monasteries into two main types: those with dining halls and those with open courtyards. The Eski Gümüşler Monastery falls into the second group, with its different sections opening off a central courtyard. Its most important part is the church to the north of the courtyard. The church comprises four freestanding closed aisles based on the Greek cross plan. The northern aisle contains a niche with two tombs. To the west there are two entrances covered with a cradle vault.

Three different masters are assumed to have worked on the church frescoes. The main apse contains three bands of paintings: the highest shows Christ Enthroned with two angels to his right; the symbols of the gospel writers; and the Deisis with Mary and the disciples. The lowest band shows the Cappadocian Fathers of the church: St Basil the Great of Kayseri, Gregory of Nysa, and Gregory of Nazianzus.

In the north arm of the cross are representations of the Annunciation, the Nativity and the Presentation in the Temple with the figures of St John the Baptist and Saint Stephen which must have been painted by a second artist. On the inside of the narthex to the south of the entrance door are representations of the Virgin Mary and baby Jesus with, on either side of them, the archangels Gabriel and Michael, apparently painted by a third artist.

Much attention has been paid to a fresco of the Virgin Mary who appears to be smiling. However, this is almost certainly the result of careless restoration.

The walls of the room above the narthex are painted with what appear to be images from Aesop's Fables - uniquely for Cappadocia.

The style and iconography of the frescoes of the Eski Gümüşler Monastery resemble those in many other Cappadocian churches. The frescoes are believed to date from the 7th to 11th centuries.

The Byzantine scholar Robert Ousterhout has suggested that Eskı Gümüşler may not, in fact, be a monastic site but the home of a nobleman with a private chapel. The frescoes from Aesop's Fables make more sense in this interpretation.

== Gallery ==
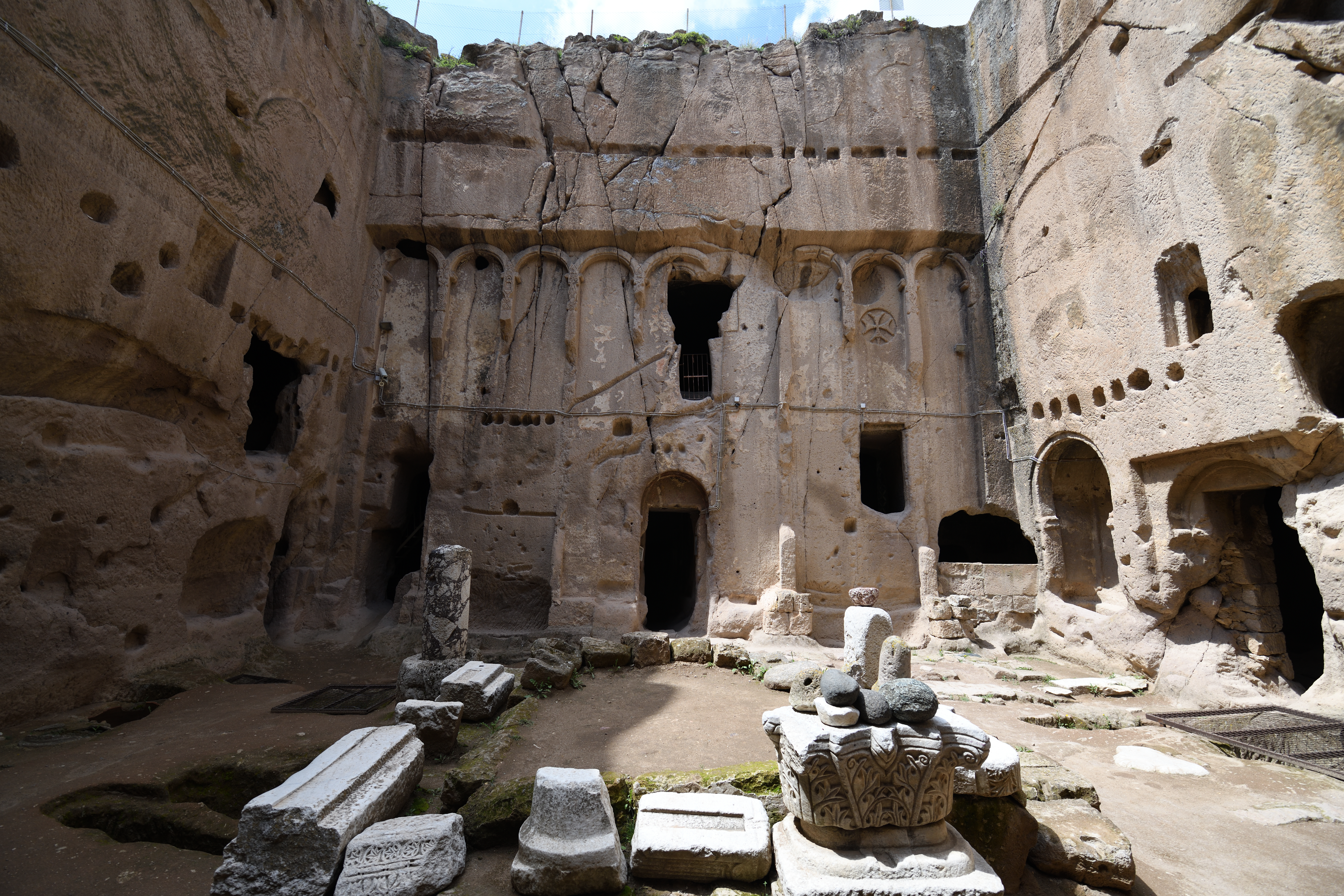
Niğde Gümüşler Monastery Courtyard

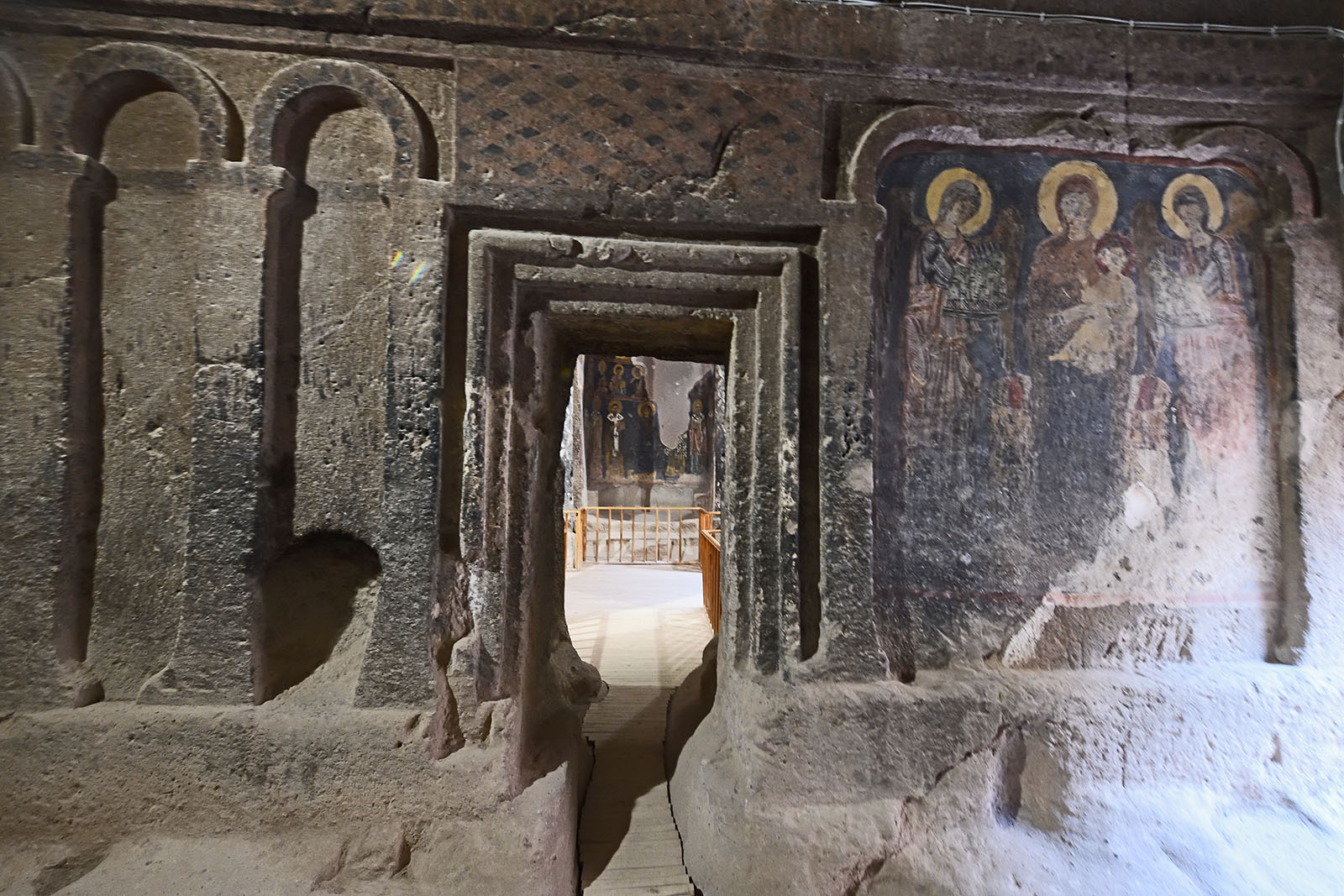
Niğde Gümüşler Monastery Narthex view to church

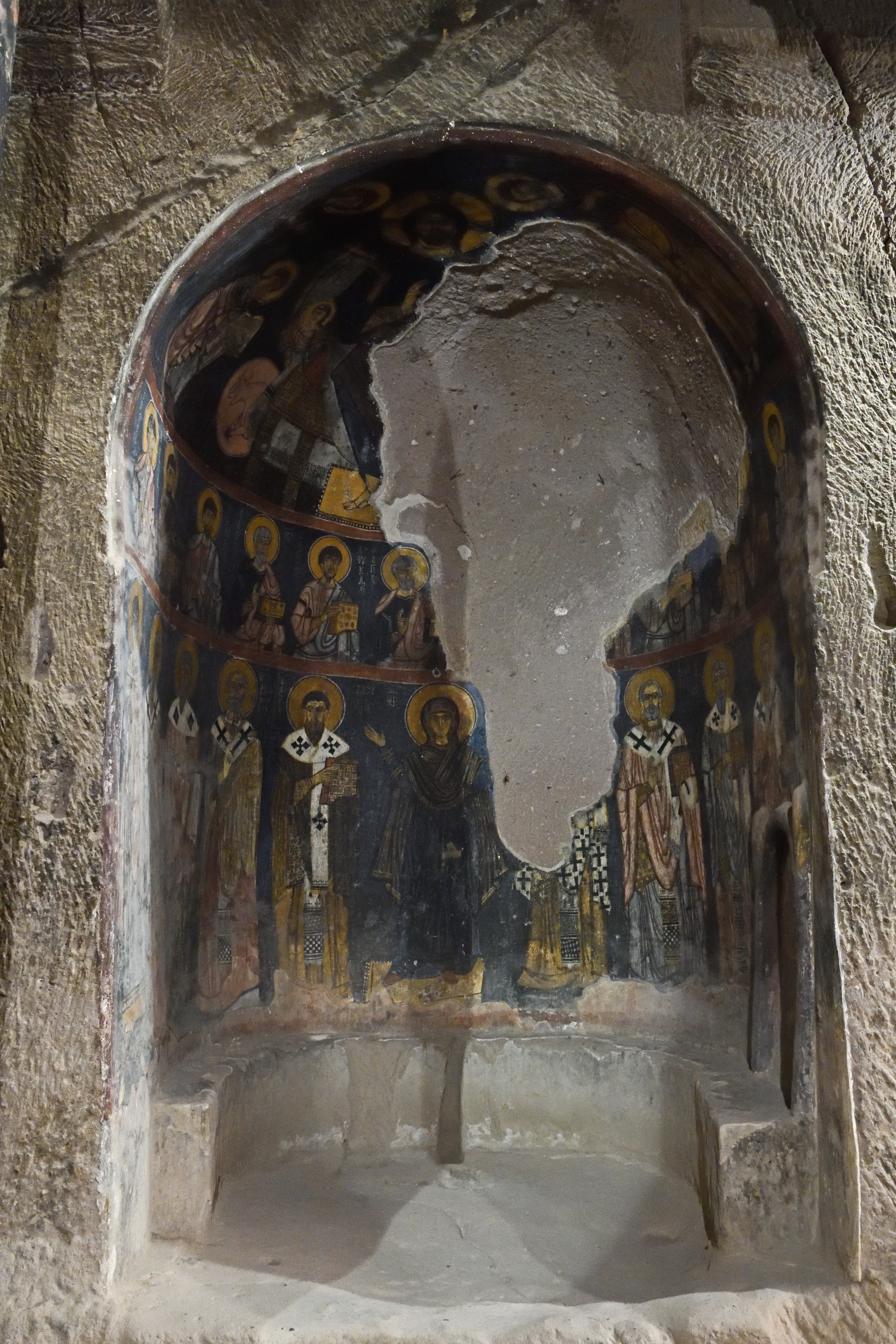
Gümüşler Monastery Main apse

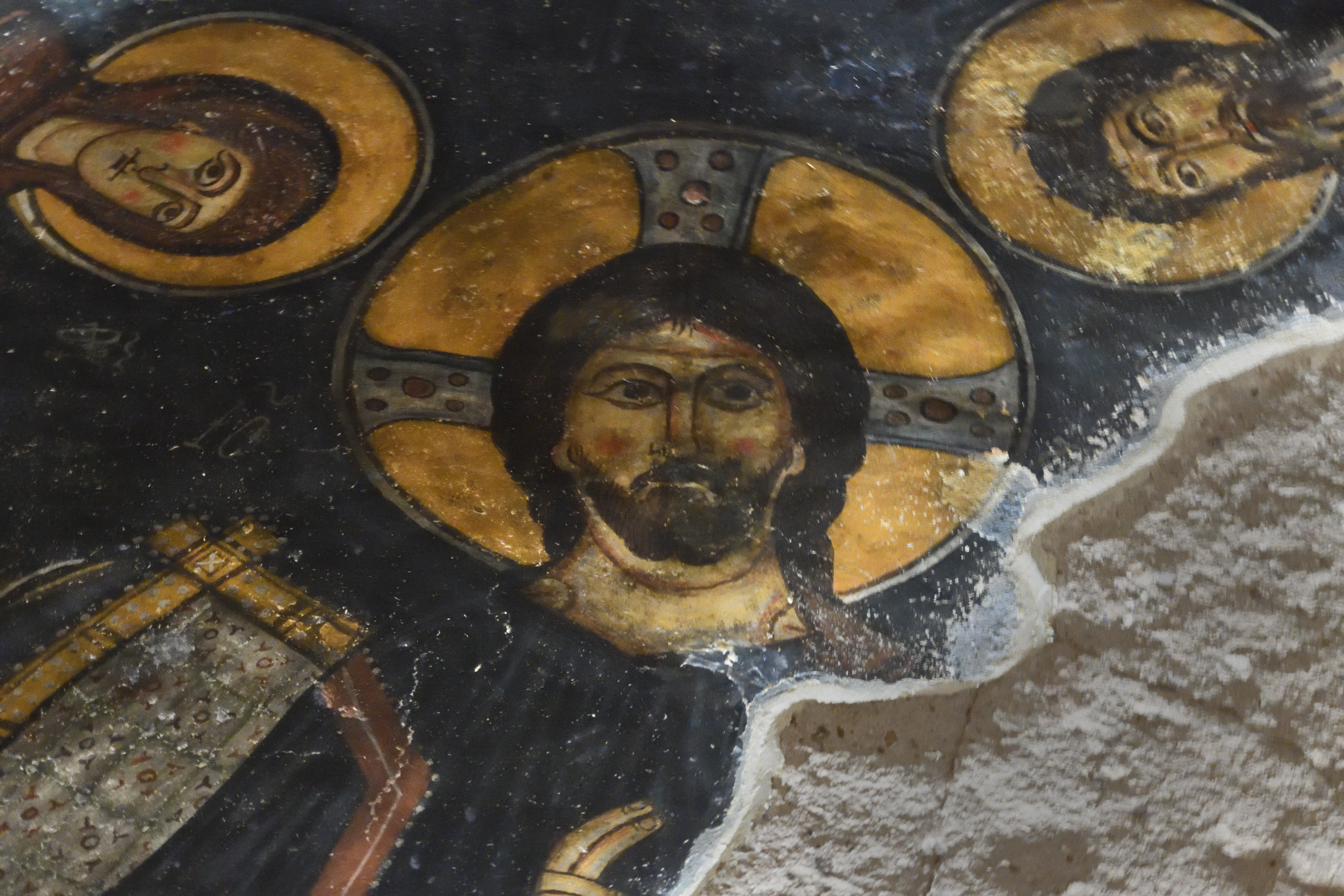
Niğde Gümüşler Monastery Main apse Christ enthroned

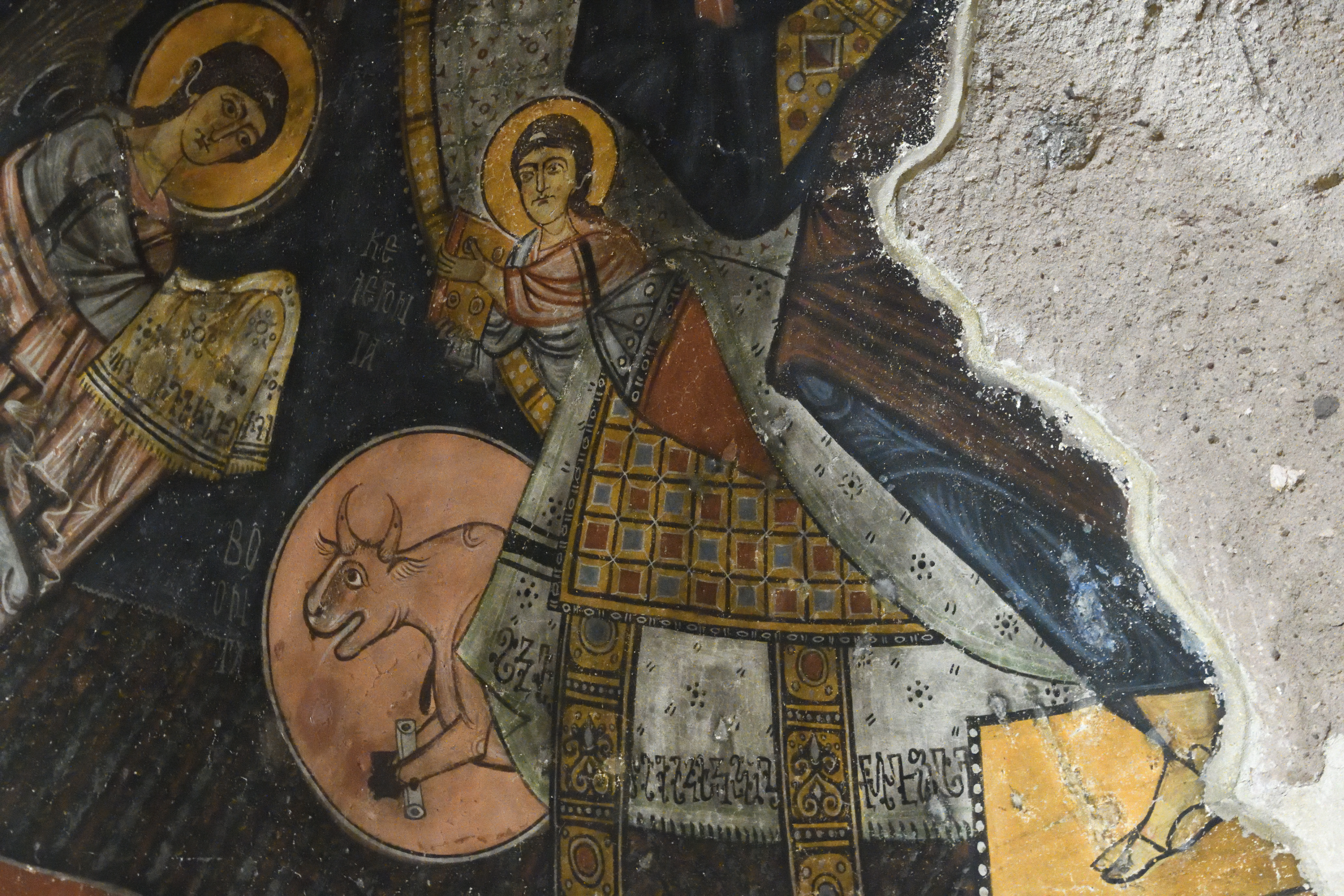
Niğde Gümüşler Monastery Main apse with symbols of Gospel writers

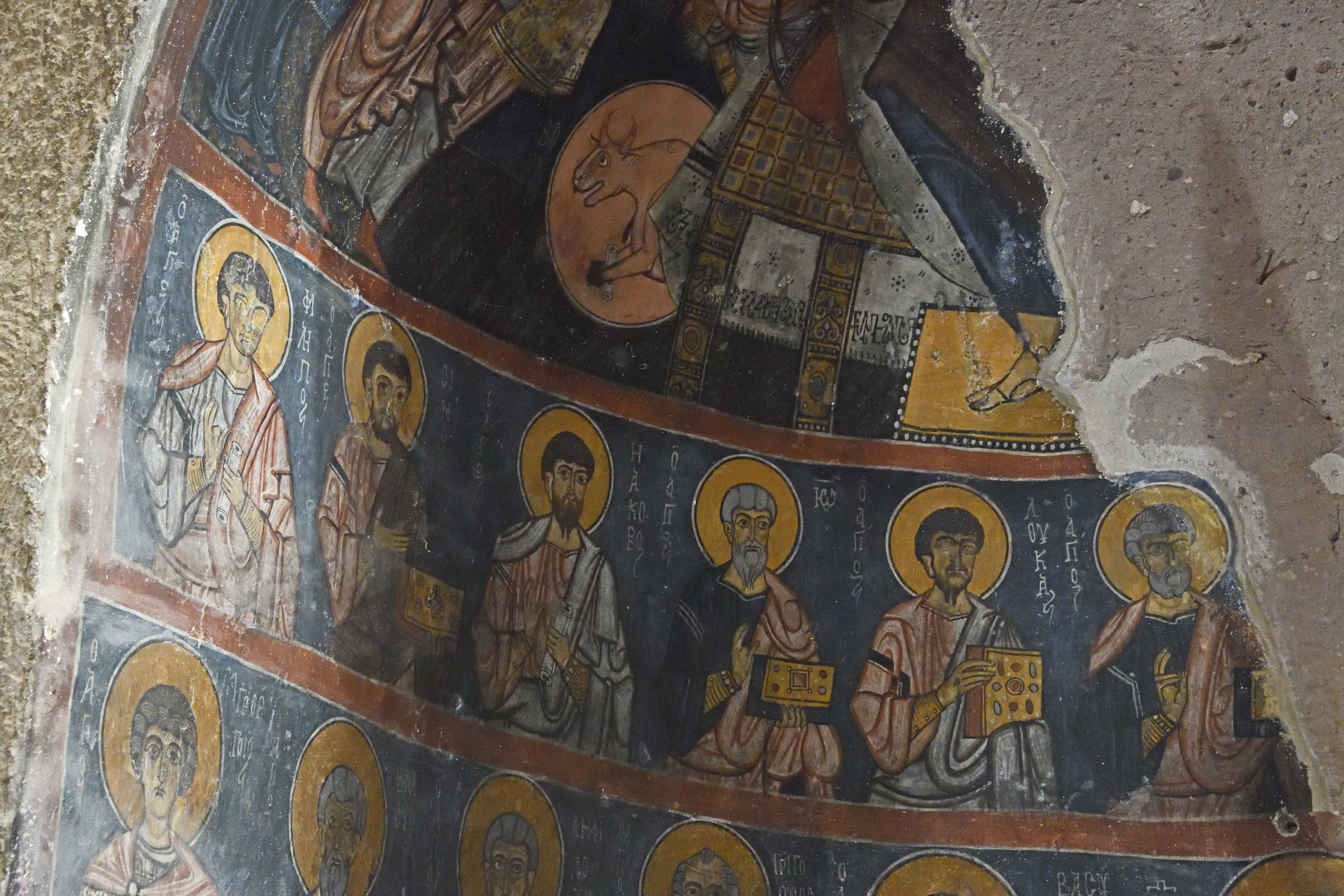
Gümüşler Monastery Main apse Disciples

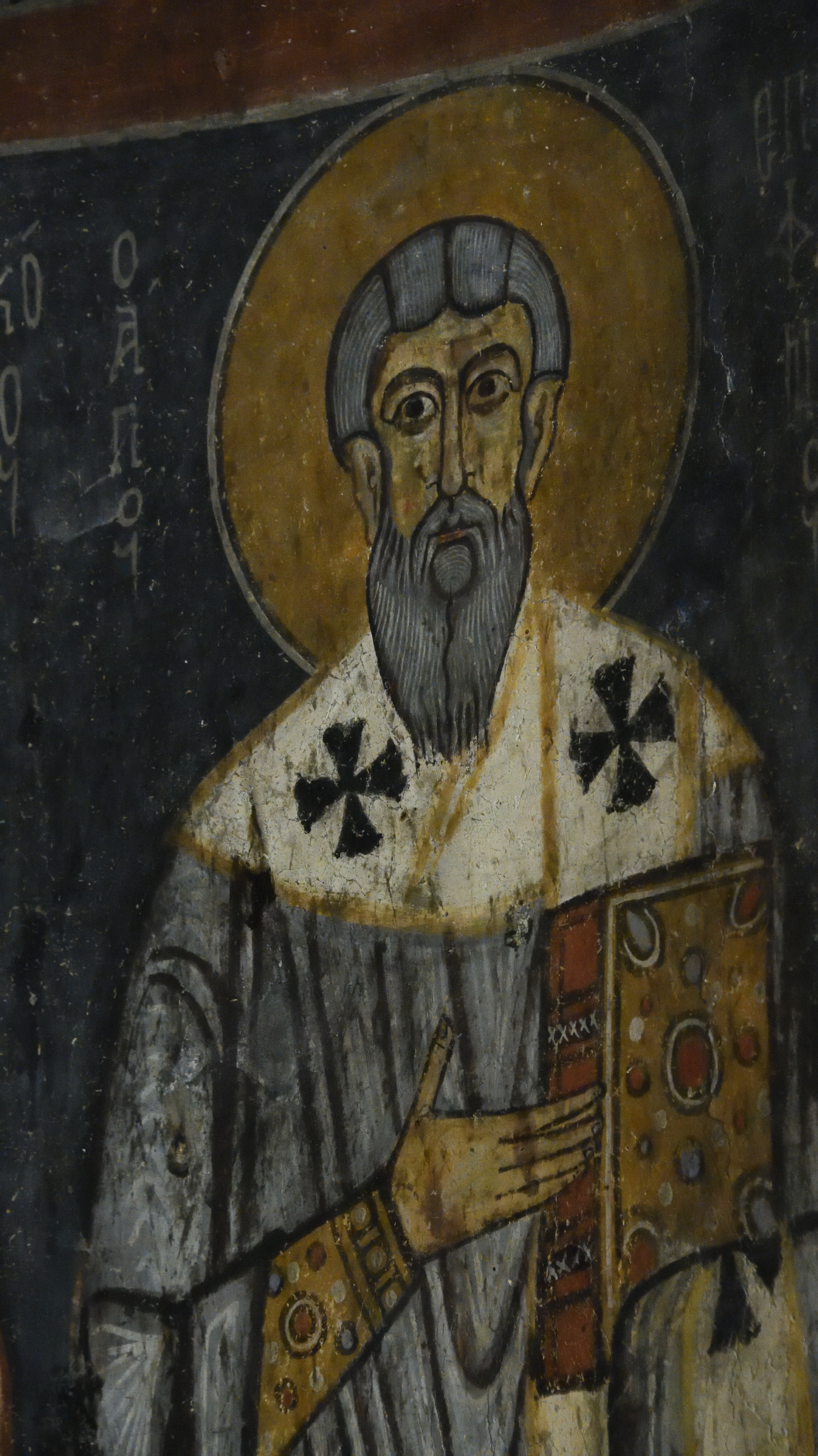
Niğde Gümüşler Monastery Church father

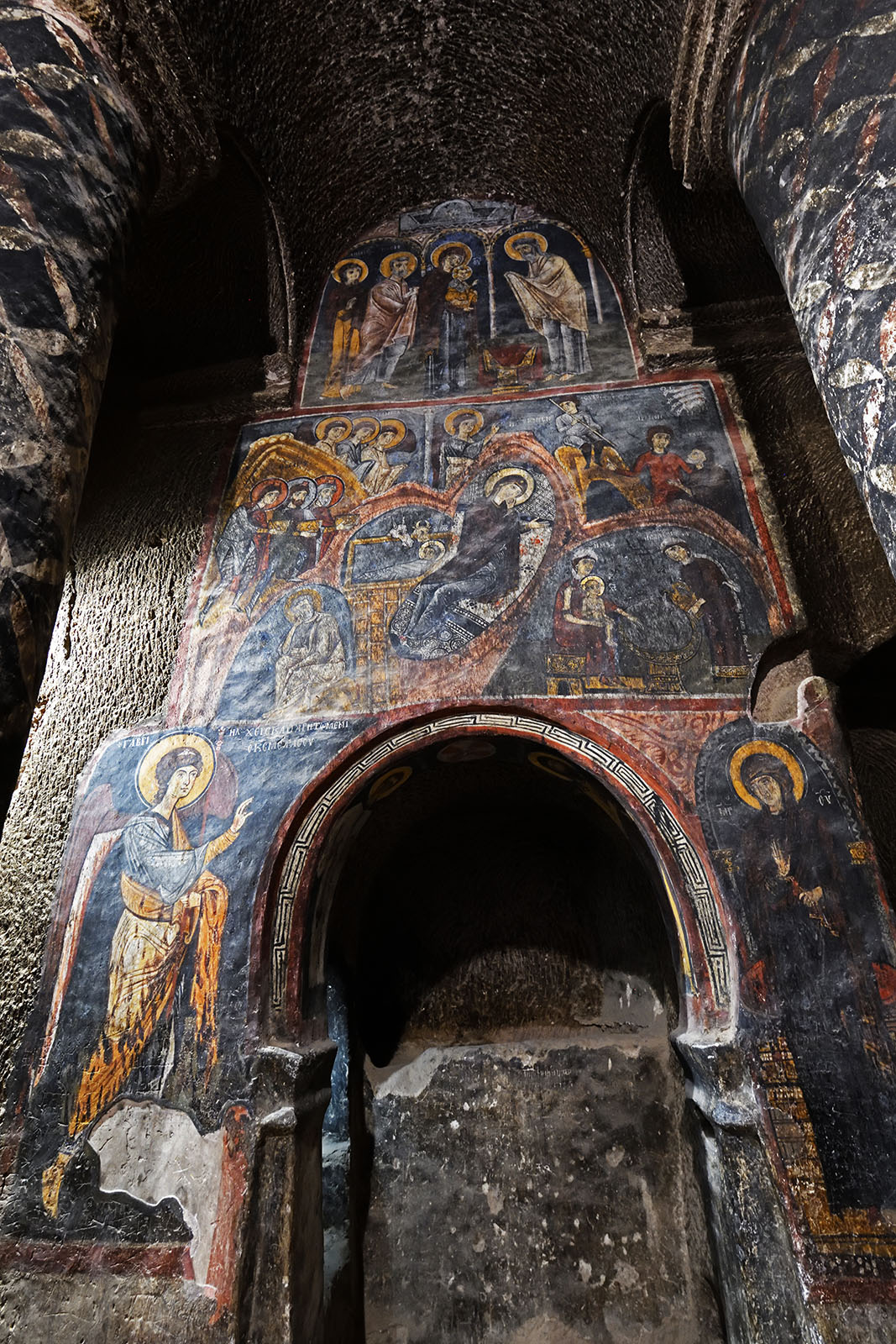
Niğde Gümüşler Monastery North aisle

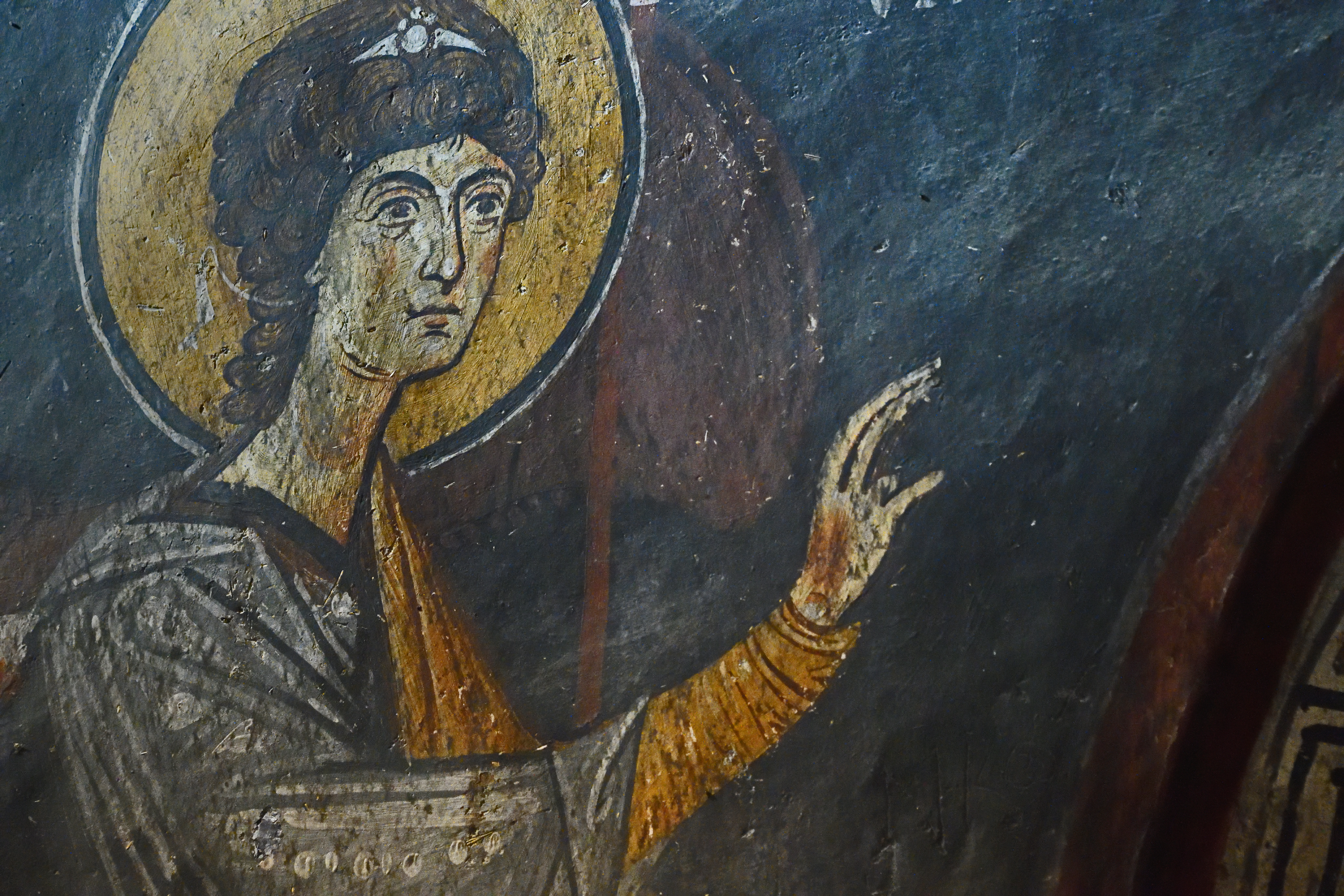
Niğde Gümüşler Monastery North aisle Annunciation

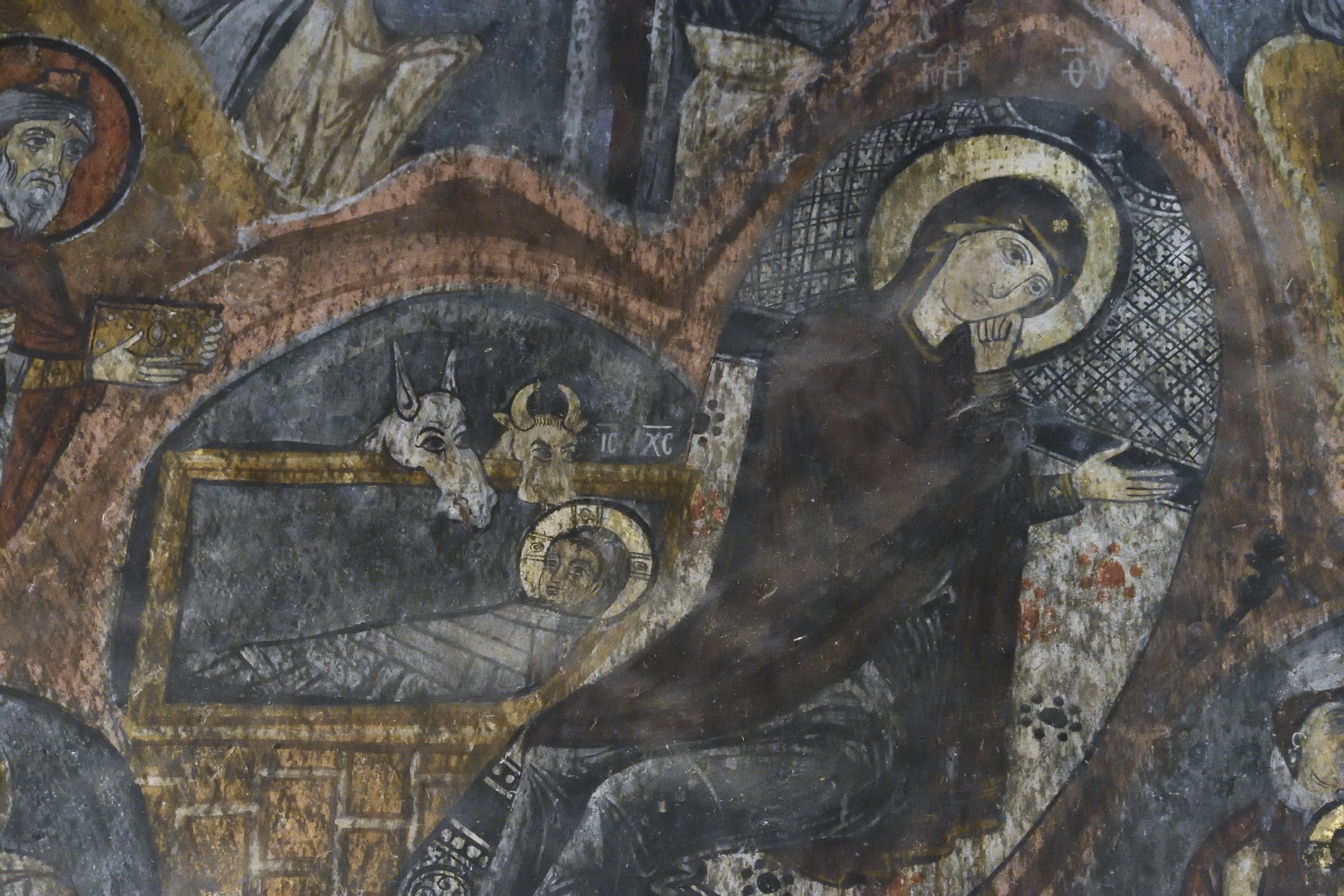
Niğde Gümüşler Monastery North aisle Nativity

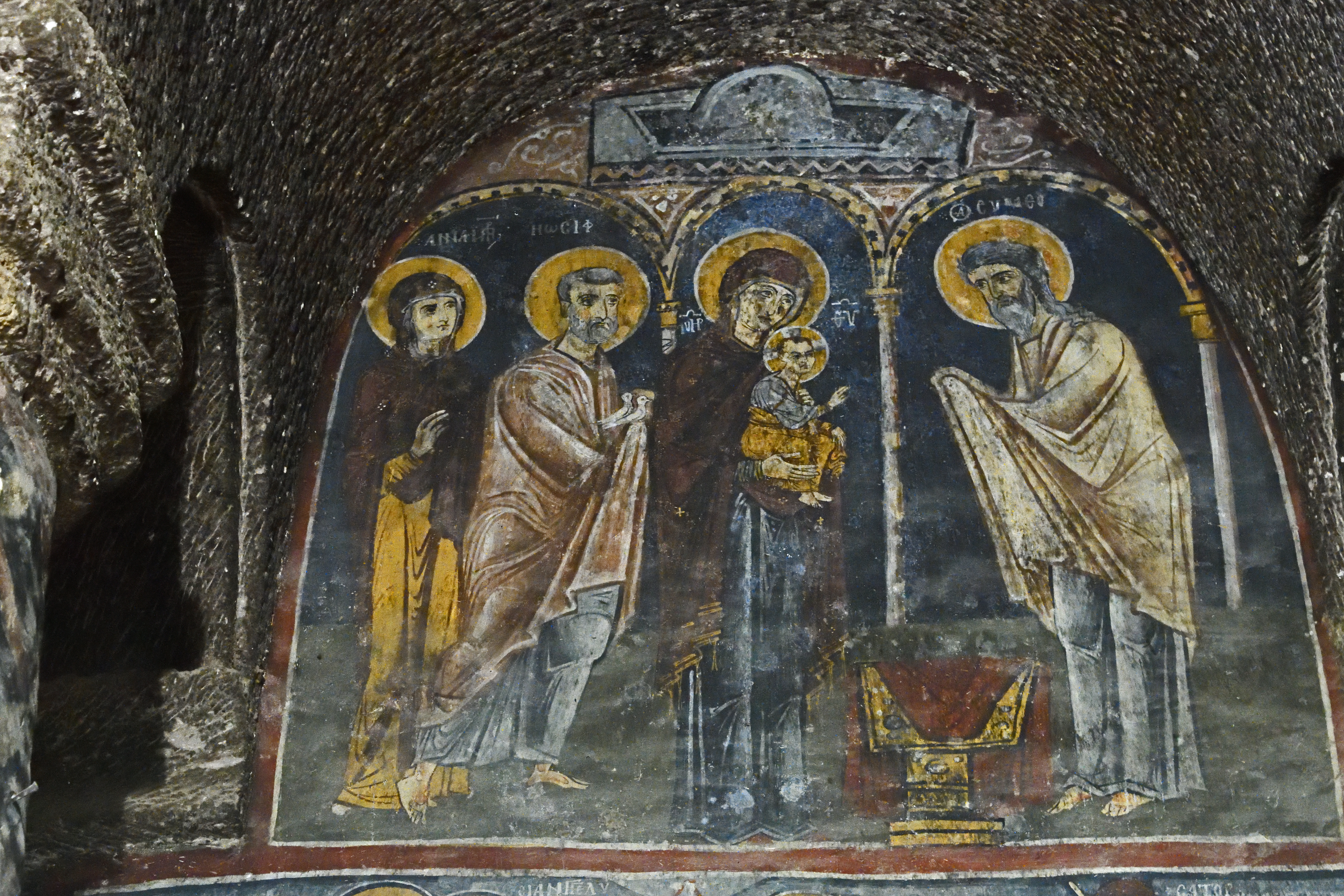
Niğde Gümüşler Monastery North aisle Presentation in temple

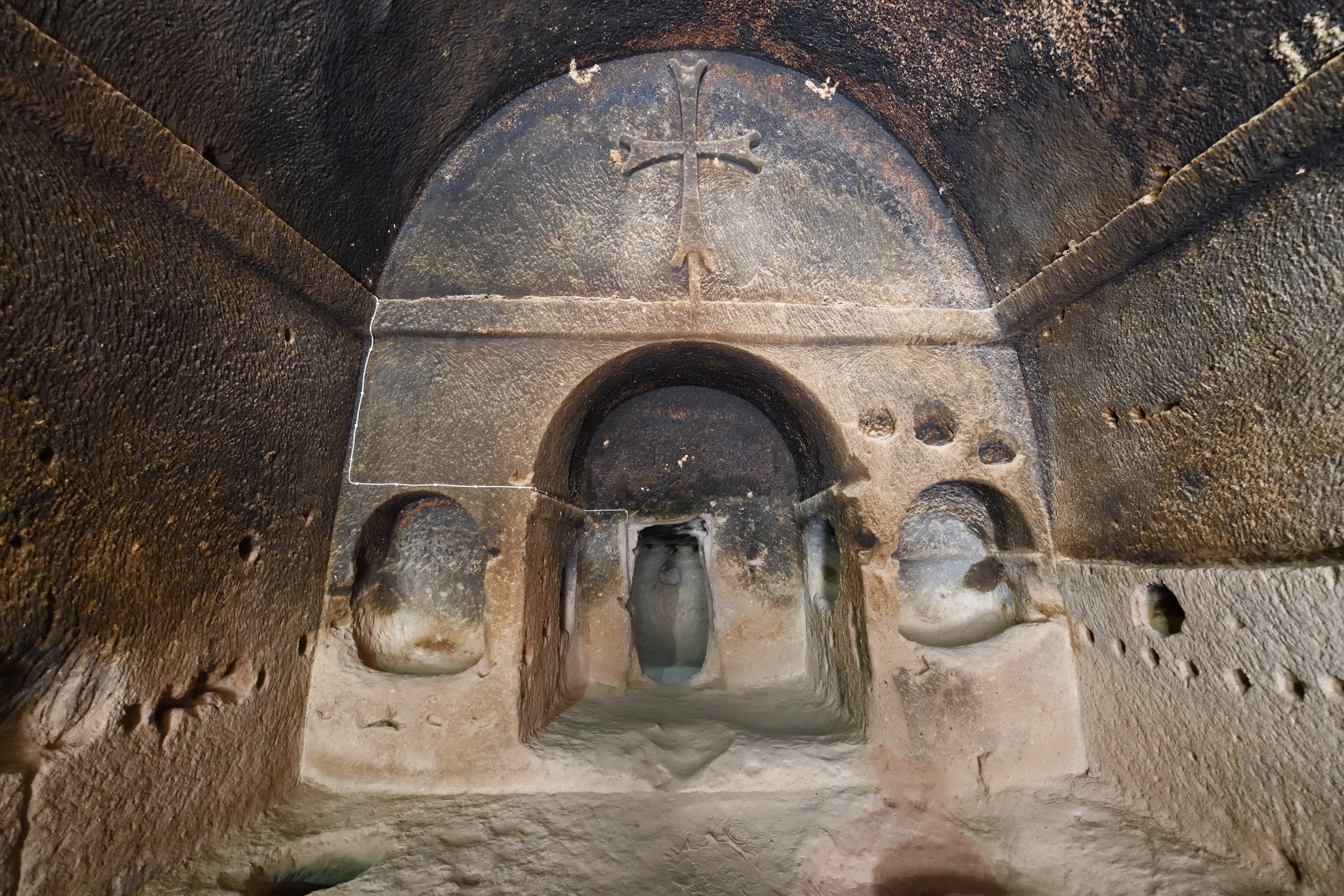
Niğde Gümüşler Monastery Room right of courtyard

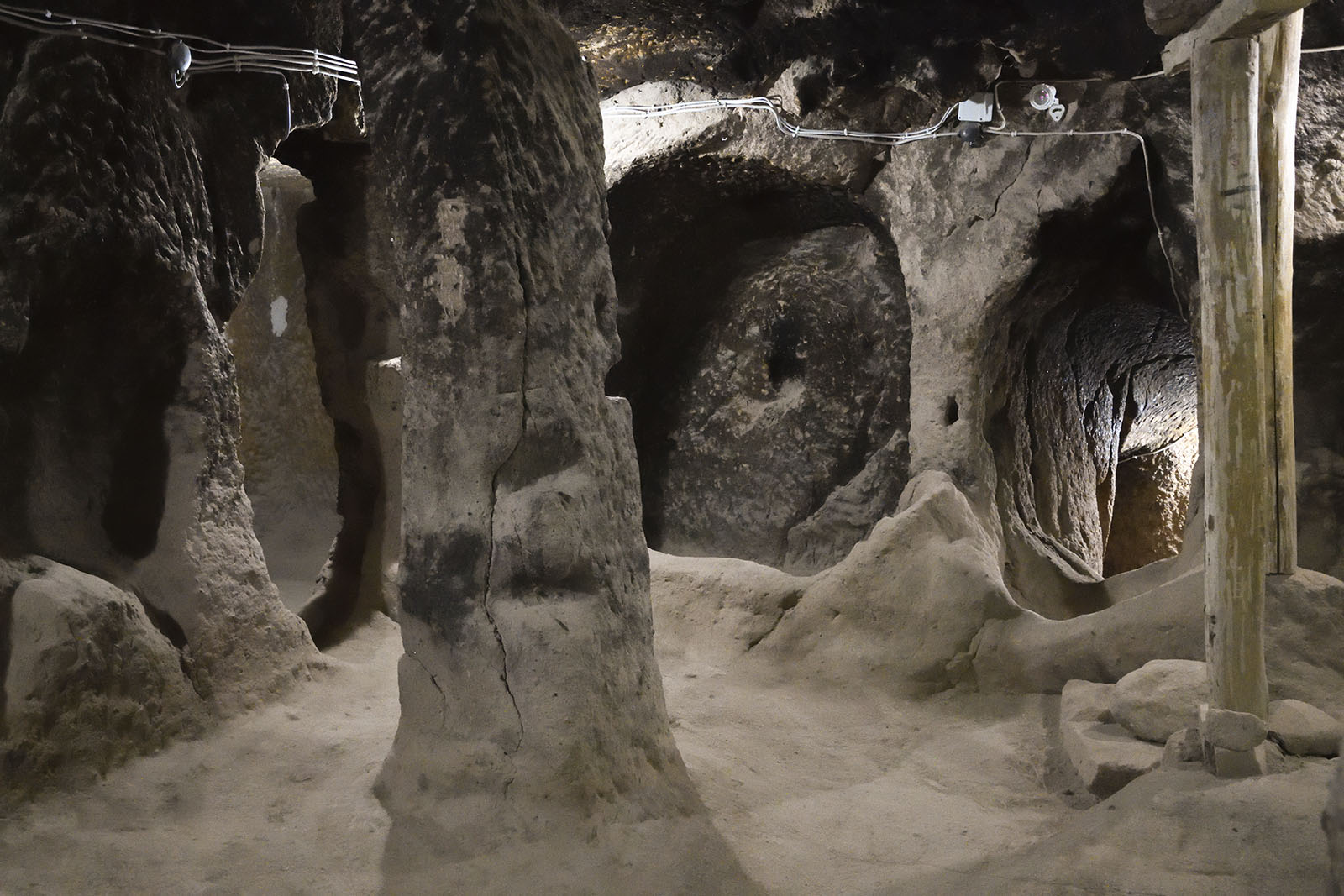
Niğde Gümüşler Monastery Underground area

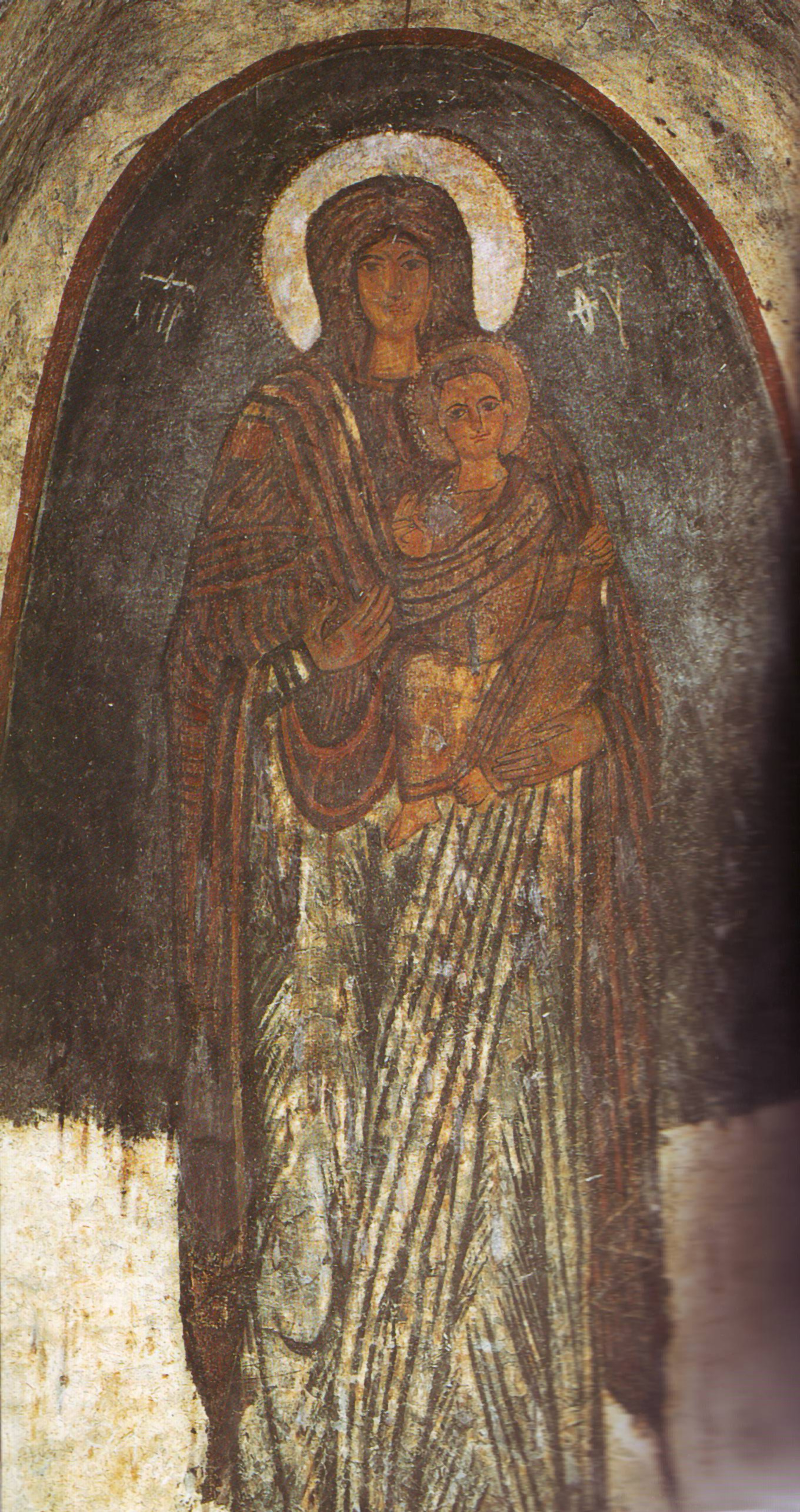
"Smiling" Three-handed Virgin Mary with Christ, the left side apse
