= Alay, Niğde =

Alay
- Municipality
- Location in Turkey Alay (Turkey Central Anatolia)
- Coordinates: 38°15′N 34°42′E
- Country: Turkey
- Province: Niğde
- District: Niğde
- Elevation: 1,305 m (4,281 ft)
- Population (2022): 3,038
- Time zone: UTC+3 (TRT)
- Postal code: 51010
- Area code: 0388

Alay is a town (belde) in the Niğde District, Niğde Province, Turkey. Its population is 3,038 (2022). It is situated 42 kilometres (26 mi) north of Niğde. The town may be very old. According to Mayor's page it was named after İsmail Bahri Mahmut, a commander of a regiment (Turkish: Alay). The settlement was declared a seat of township in 1988. The main crops of the town are potato and wheat.
