= Divarlı =

- Municipality
- Location in Turkey Divarlı (Turkey Central Anatolia)
- Coordinates: 38°12′16″N 34°27′55″E
- Country: Turkey
- Province: Niğde
- District: Çiftlik
- Population (2022): 4,198
- Time zone: UTC+3 (TRT)

Divarlı is a town (belde) in the Çiftlik District, Niğde Province, Turkey. Its population is 4,198 (2022).
