= Gümüşler, Niğde =

Gümüşler
- Municipality
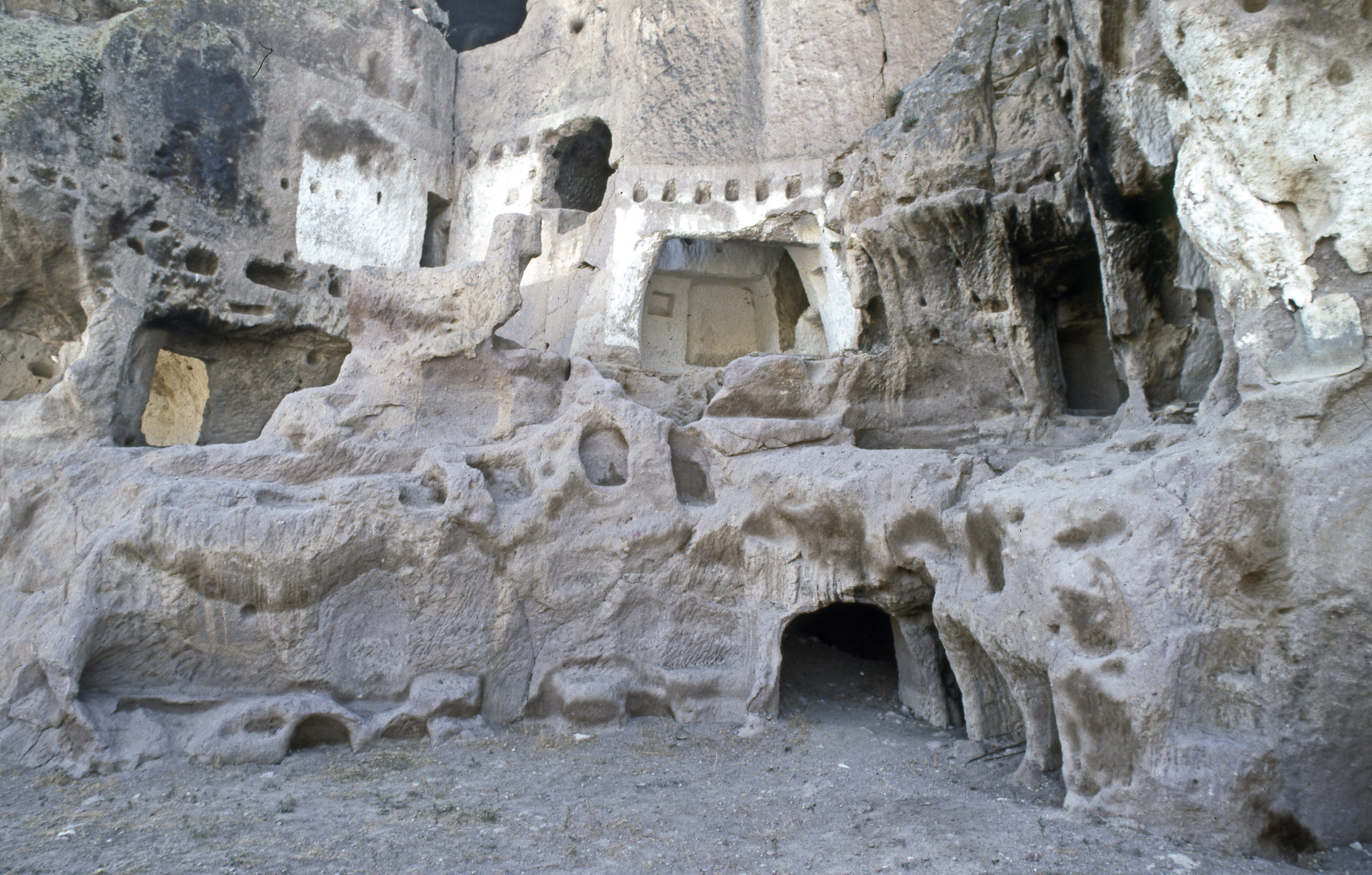
- Gümüşler Monastery

- Location within Turkey Location within Turkey Central Anatolia
- Coordinates: 38°00′N 34°46′E
- Country: Turkey
- Province: Niğde
- District: Niğde
- Elevation: 1,350 m (4,430 ft)
- Population (2022): 2,950
- Time zone: UTC+3 (TRT)
- Area code: 0388

Gümüşler is a town (belde) in the Niğde District, Niğde Province, Turkey. Its population is 2,950 (2022). It is 7 kilometres (4.3 mi) east of the city of Niğde. During the Byzantine era, its name was Tracias. The most important Byzantine building in the town is Gümüşler Monastery, which is a cave monastery.

== See also ==
- Gümüşler Monastery
- Gümüşler Dam
