= Edikli, Niğde =

Edikli
- Municipality
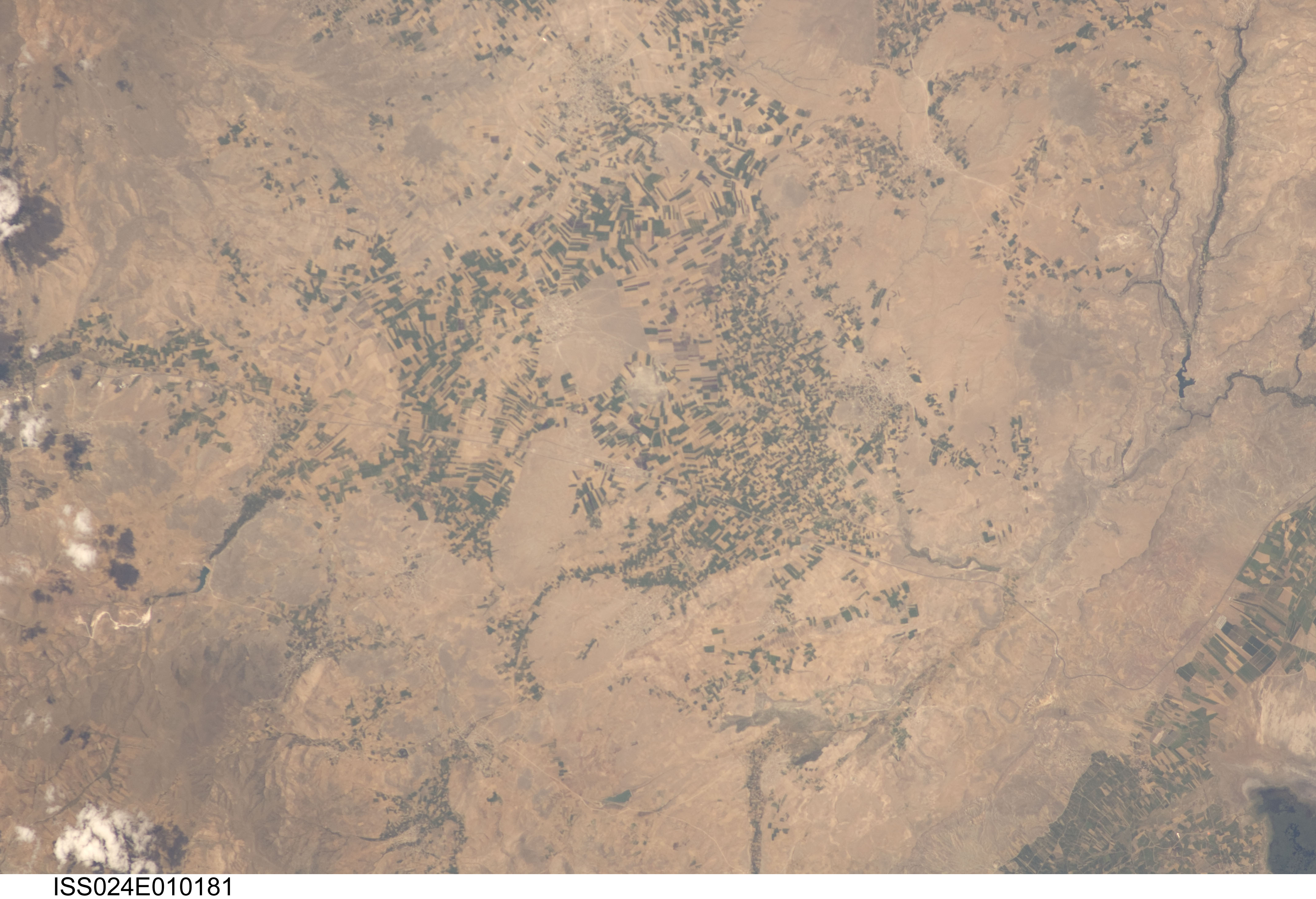
- Edikli and environs viewed from space

- Location within Turkey Location within Turkey Central Anatolia
- Coordinates: 38°15′N 34°57′E
- Country: Turkey
- Province: Niğde
- District: Niğde
- Elevation: 1,385 m (4,544 ft)
- Population (2022): 4,618
- Time zone: UTC+3 (TRT)
- Postal code: 51040
- Area code: 0388

Edikli is a town (belde) in the Niğde District, Niğde Province, Turkey. Its population is 4,618 (2022). It is at the east of Misli plains. Distance to Niğde is about 45 kilometres (28 mi). The settlement was known to be a Seljuk settlement. But it was ruined during the Mongol invasion in the 13th century. According to inscriptions on the oldest mosque of the town, the settlement was refounded in 1730s, during the Ottoman era. In 1970 it was declared a seat of township. Main agricultural product of the town is potato. Other crops like apple and nuts are also produced.
