= Gümüşköy, Germencik =

Gümüşköy
- Neighbourhood
- Country: Turkey
- Province: Aydın
- District: Germencik
- Population (2022): 252
- Time zone: UTC+3 (TRT)

Gümüşköy is a neighbourhood in the municipality and district of Germencik, Aydın Province, Turkey. Its population is 252 (2022). It is the site of the Gümüşköy Geothermal Power Plant.
