= Gümüşhane (disambiguation) =

Gümüşhane is a city and the capital district of Gümüşhane Province, Turkey.

Gümüşhane means "silver house" in Turkish. It may refer to:

- Gümüşhane Province, a province of Turkey
- Gümüşhane Airport, in the province
- Gümüşhane University, in the city
- Gümüşhanespor, a sports club based in the city
- Gümüşhane, Ardanuç, a village in the district of Ardanuç, Artvin Province, Turkey
