= Aktaş, Niğde =

Aktaş
- Municipality
- Location within Turkey Location within Turkey Central Anatolia
- Coordinates: 38°1′35″N 34°46′6″E
- Country: Turkey
- Province: Niğde
- District: Niğde
- Population (2022): 2,024
- Time zone: UTC+3 (TRT)

Aktaş is a town (belde) in the Niğde District, Niğde Province, Turkey. Its population is 2,024 (2022).

The town had around 2,000 Cappadocian Greek Christian inhabitants in the early 20th century, who spoke Cappadocian Greek until 1884.
