= Bağlama, Niğde =

Bağlama
- Municipality
- Location in Turkey Bağlama (Turkey Central Anatolia)
- Coordinates: 38°14′34″N 34°39′31″E
- Country: Turkey
- Province: Niğde
- District: Niğde
- Population (2022): 2,139
- Time zone: UTC+3 (TRT)

Bağlama is a town (belde) in the Niğde District, Niğde Province, Turkey. Its population is 2,139 (2022).
