= Konaklı, Niğde =

Konaklı
- Municipality
- Location in Turkey Konaklı (Turkey Central Anatolia)
- Coordinates: 38°10′19″N 34°50′57″E
- Country: Turkey
- Province: Niğde
- District: Niğde
- Population (2022): 2,884
- Time zone: UTC+3 (TRT)

Konaklı is a town (belde) in the Niğde District, Niğde Province, Turkey. Its population is 2,884 (2022). Before the 1920s population exchange between Greece and Turkey, it was named Misthi and was exclusively inhabited by Greek Orthodox Cappadocians who spoke the Cappadocian Greek dialect.
