= Bozköy, Çiftlik =

Bozköy
- Municipality
- Location in Turkey Bozköy (Turkey Central Anatolia)
- Coordinates: 38°14′10″N 34°29′2″E
- Country: Turkey
- Province: Niğde
- District: Çiftlik
- Population (2022): 3,793
- Time zone: UTC+3 (TRT)

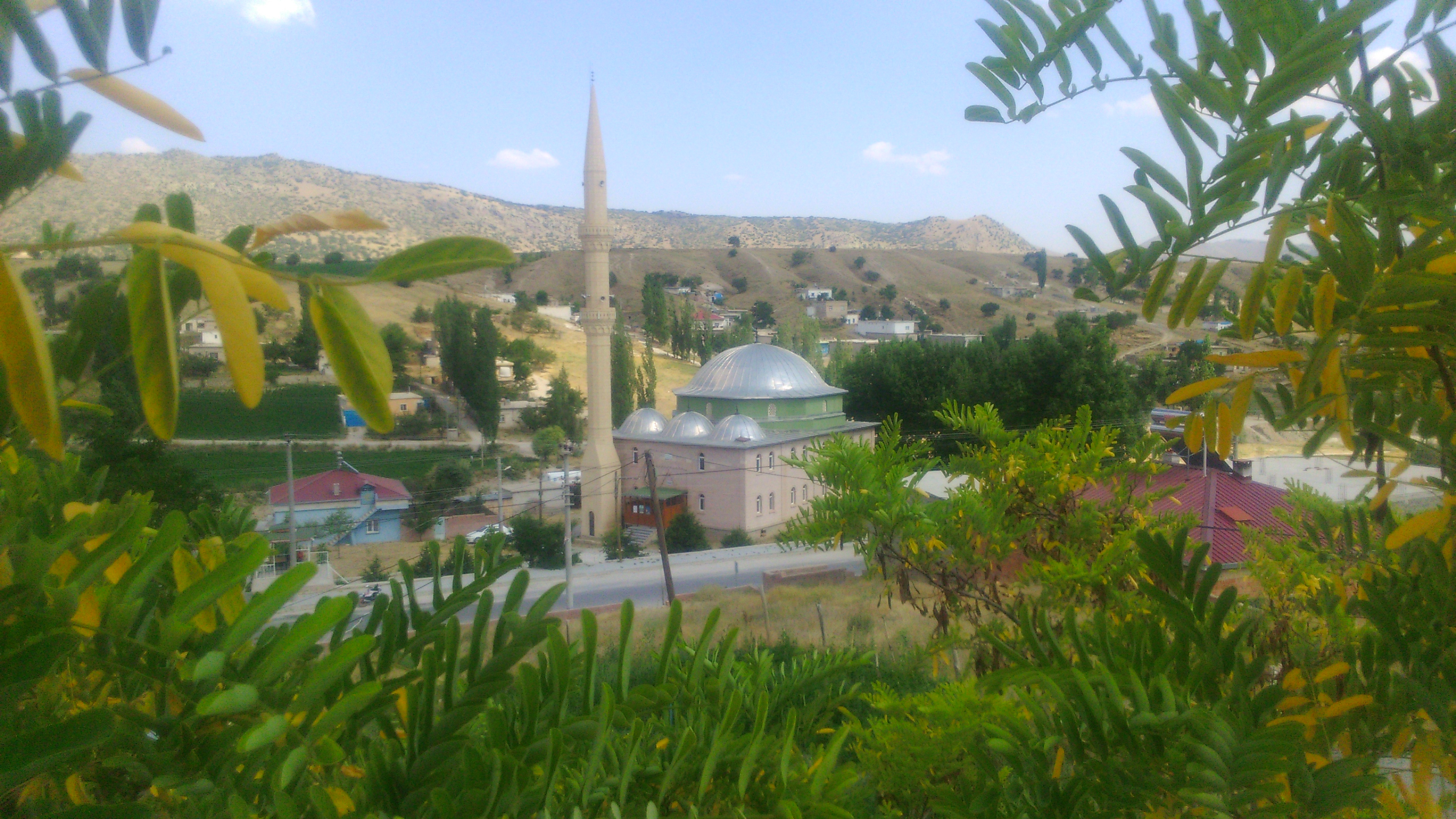
Bozköy Mehmet Akif Camii

Bozköy is a town (belde) in the Çiftlik District, Niğde Province, Turkey. Its population is 3,793 (2022).
