= Azatlı =

- Municipality
- Location in Turkey Azatlı (Turkey Central Anatolia)
- Coordinates: 38.168°N 34.5183°E
- Country: Turkey
- Province: Niğde
- District: Çiftlik
- Elevation: 1,665 m (5,463 ft)
- Population (2022): 3,670
- Time zone: UTC+3 (TRT)
- Postal code: 51820
- Area code: 0388

Azatlı is a town (belde) in the Çiftlik District, Niğde Province, Turkey. Its population is 3,670 (2022). It is situated at about 1,600 m (5,200 ft) elevation on the western slopes of a mountainous area. Its distance to Niğde is 65 kilometres (40 mi). In 1973 it was declared a seat of township. Main economic activity is agriculture and the main crop is potato.
