= Yeşilgölcük =

- Municipality
- Location within Turkey Location within Turkey Central Anatolia
- Coordinates: 38°13′N 34°47′E
- Country: Turkey
- Province: Niğde
- District: Niğde
- Elevation: 1,325 m (4,347 ft)
- Population (2022): 5,425
- Time zone: UTC+3 (TRT)
- Postal code: 51070
- Area code: 0388

Yeşilgölcük is a town (belde) in the Niğde District, Niğde Province, Turkey. Its population is 5,425 (2022). It is 35 kilometres (22 mi) north of Niğde.

Yeşilgölcük used to be the site of the ancient Greek town of Limnae (Ancient Greek: Λίμναι).

It had around 2,000 Cappadocian Greek Christian inhabitants and 650 Muslim Turkish inhabitants in the early 20th century. Its Christian inhabitants spoke Cappadocian Greek until 1880.
