= Orhanlı, Niğde =

Orhanlı
- Municipality
- Location in Turkey Orhanlı (Turkey Central Anatolia)
- Coordinates: 38°18′N 34°54′E
- Country: Turkey
- Province: Niğde
- District: Niğde
- Established: 1972
- Elevation: 1,450 m (4,760 ft)
- Population (2022): 2,384
- Time zone: UTC+3 (TRT)
- Postal code: 51280
- Area code: 0388

Orhanlı is a town (belde) in the Niğde District, Niğde Province, Turkey. Its population is 2,384 (2022). It is 53 kilometres (33 mi) north of Niğde. Like most other settlements in ancient Capadocia, the caves around the town were used as dwellings in the deep history of the town and in fact, the name of the town is probably a corrupt form of the phrase On hanlı ("with ten dwellings") referring to ten families settled in the caves.
