= Kiledere =

- Municipality
- Location in Turkey Kiledere (Turkey Central Anatolia)
- Coordinates: 38°18′26″N 34°41′25″E
- Country: Turkey
- Province: Niğde
- District: Niğde
- Population (2022): 5,469
- Time zone: UTC+3 (TRT)

Kiledere is a town (belde) in the Niğde District, Niğde Province, Turkey. Its population is 5,469 (2022).
