= Hacıabdullah =

- Municipality
- Location in Turkey Hacıabdullah (Turkey Central Anatolia)
- Coordinates: 38°10′33″N 34°38′12″E
- Country: Turkey
- Province: Niğde
- District: Niğde
- Population (2022): 1,871
- Time zone: UTC+3 (TRT)

Hacıabdullah is a town (belde) in the Niğde District, Niğde Province, Turkey. Its population is 1,871 (2022).
