= Gümüşköy Geothermal Power Plant =

Geothermal power plant in Turkey

- Location of Gümüşköy Geothermal Power Plant in Turkey
- Official name: Gümüşköy Jeotermal Elektrik Santralı
- Country: Turkey
- Location: Gümüşköy, Germencik, Aydın Province
- Coordinates: 37°51′20″N 27°27′48″E
- Status: Operational
- Construction cost: US$49.6 million

Geothermal power station
- Min. source temp.: 182 °C (360 °F)

Power generation
- Nameplate capacity: 13.20 MW

The Gümüşköy Geothermal Power Plant (Turkish: Gümüşköy Jeotermal Elektrik Santralı) is an air-cooled Organic Ranking Cycle (ORC) system geothermal power plant located at Gümüşköy village of Germencik district in Aydın Province, Turkey. The power plant feeds from the 182 °C Gümüşköy Geothermal Reservoir, which was discovered with the GK-1 geothermal well in October 2008.

The power plant has a gross installed power capacity of 13.20 MW divided in two units and uses two Ormat, Israel manufactured units for energy generation. Annual production is 108.24 GWh gross. The systems also feeds a CO_{2} purification and production plant having a 12-ton daily production capacity.

== Gümüşköy Geothermal Reservoir ==
The Gümüşköy Geothermal Reservoir was discovered by BM Geothermal Group in 2008, as the first private sector high enthalpy geothermal discovery in Turkey. The reservoir is a lithologically capped hydrothermal system with three layers of reservoirs underlying one another.

The first reservoir is located between 100- and 400-meter depths, with an average temperature of 100 °C. The second (interim) reservoir is located between 800- and 1400-meter depths, with an average temperature of 150 °C. The final reservoir is located around 2,000-meter depths with an average temperature of 180 °C.

The Gümüşköy Geothermal Power Plant produces from and re-injects into the interim and the bottom reservoirs.

== Geothermal fluid production ==
Full capacity operation requires 740 tons per hour of geothermal brine from the reservoir. The geothermal fluid is supplied from a total of 4 production wells, GK-1, GK-3, GK-7 and GK-9. Re-injection of the fluid into the reservoir is realized through two re-injection wells, R-GK-4 and R-GK-6. A third, temporary re-injection well R-GK-1 is kept standby at the power plant site.

Two production wells yielding a total of 450 tons per hour geothermal fluid are already completed. The production well GK-1 blows steam since January 2011.

== See also ==
- Geothermal energy in Turkey
