= Dündarlı =

- Municipality
- Location in Turkey Dündarlı (Turkey Central Anatolia)
- Coordinates: 38°05′N 35°11′E
- Country: Turkey
- Province: Niğde
- District: Niğde
- Elevation: 1,350 m (4,430 ft)
- Population (2022): 2,267
- Time zone: UTC+3 (TRT)
- Postal code: 51000
- Area code: 0388

Dündarlı is a town (belde) in the Niğde District, Niğde Province, Turkey. Its population is 2,267 (2022). It is situated in a basin along Kocaçay creek. The distance to Niğde is 61 kilometres (38 mi). The settlement was founded in the 16th century by a clan from Eymür tribe of Turkmens. In 1963 the settlement was declared a seat of township. The town economy depends on apple production. Animal breeding and carpet are secondary activities.
