= Değirmenli, Niğde =

Değirmenli
- Municipality
- Location in Turkey Değirmenli (Turkey Central Anatolia)
- Coordinates: 38°2′31″N 34°54′1″E
- Country: Turkey
- Province: Niğde
- District: Niğde
- Population (2022): 1,569
- Time zone: UTC+3 (TRT)

Değirmenli is a town (belde) in the Niğde District, Niğde Province, Turkey. Its population is 1,569 (2022).
