= Yıldıztepe, Niğde =

Yıldıztepe
- Municipality
- Location in Turkey Yıldıztepe (Turkey Central Anatolia)
- Coordinates: 38°10′34″N 34°40′37″E
- Country: Turkey
- Province: Niğde
- District: Niğde
- Population (2022): 1,932
- Time zone: UTC+3 (TRT)

Yıldıztepe is a town (belde) located in the Niğde District, Niğde Province, Turkey. As of 2022 its population is 1,932.
