= Karaatlı, Niğde =

Karaatlı
- Municipality
- Location in Turkey Karaatlı (Turkey Central Anatolia)
- Coordinates: 38°7′55″N 34°58′15″E
- Country: Turkey
- Province: Niğde
- District: Niğde
- Population (2022): 3,078
- Time zone: UTC+3 (TRT)

Karaatlı is a town (belde) in the Niğde District, Niğde Province, Turkey. Its population is 3,078 (2022).
