= Çiftlik, Niğde =

Çiftlik
- Municipality
- Location in Turkey Çiftlik (Turkey Central Anatolia)
- Coordinates: 38°10′N 34°29′E
- Country: Turkey
- Province: Niğde
- District: Çiftlik

Government
  - Mayor: Arif Çakıl (CHP)
- Elevation: 1,555 m (5,102 ft)
- Population (2022): 4,464
- Time zone: UTC+3 (TRT)
- Postal code: 51660
- Area code: 0388
- Website: ciftlik.zeplinx.com

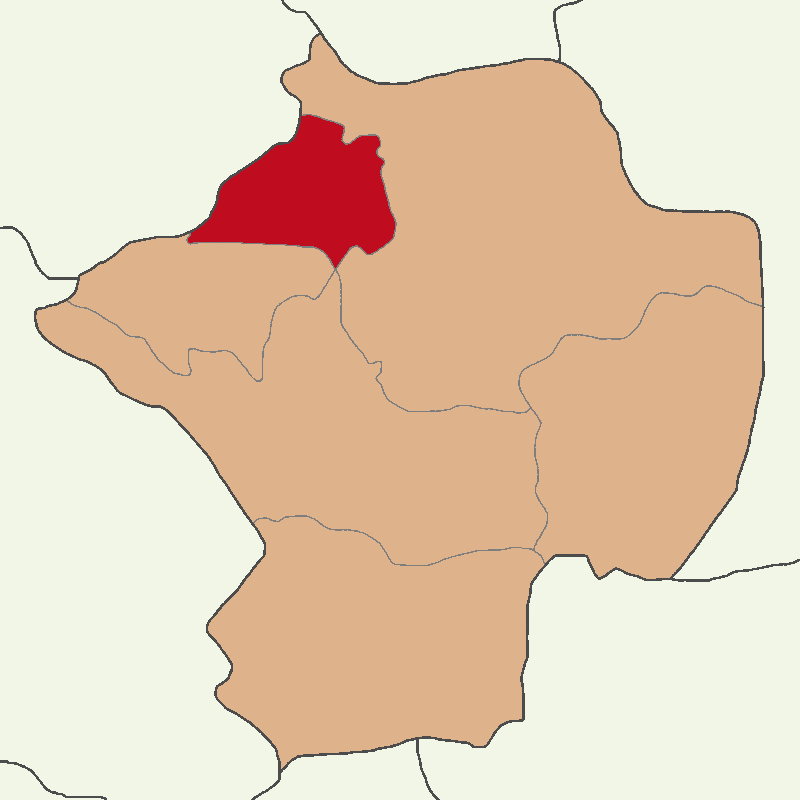
Location of Çiftlik district

Çiftlik is a town in Niğde Province in the Central Anatolia region of Turkey. It is the seat of Çiftlik District. Its population is 4,464 (2022). It is 67 km from the town of Niğde, and 65 km from Aksaray. There is a much shorter route over the mountains to Niğde but that road is often under snow and closed in winter. Its elevation is 1,555 m (5,102 ft).

Çiftlik is Turkish for farm, appropriately in this rural area which was previously known as Melendiz. Obsidian is found in the area.

== Places of interest ==
- A number of very ancient burial mounds höyük.
- The hot spring and crater lake near the village of Narköy.
