= Gümüşler Dam =

Dam in Niğde Province, Turkey

Coordinates: 38.0097°N 34.759°E

- Location: Turkey

Gümüşler Dam is a dam in Turkey. The development was backed by the Turkish State Hydraulic Works.

== See also ==
- List of dams and reservoirs in Turkey
