= Altunhisar =

- Municipality
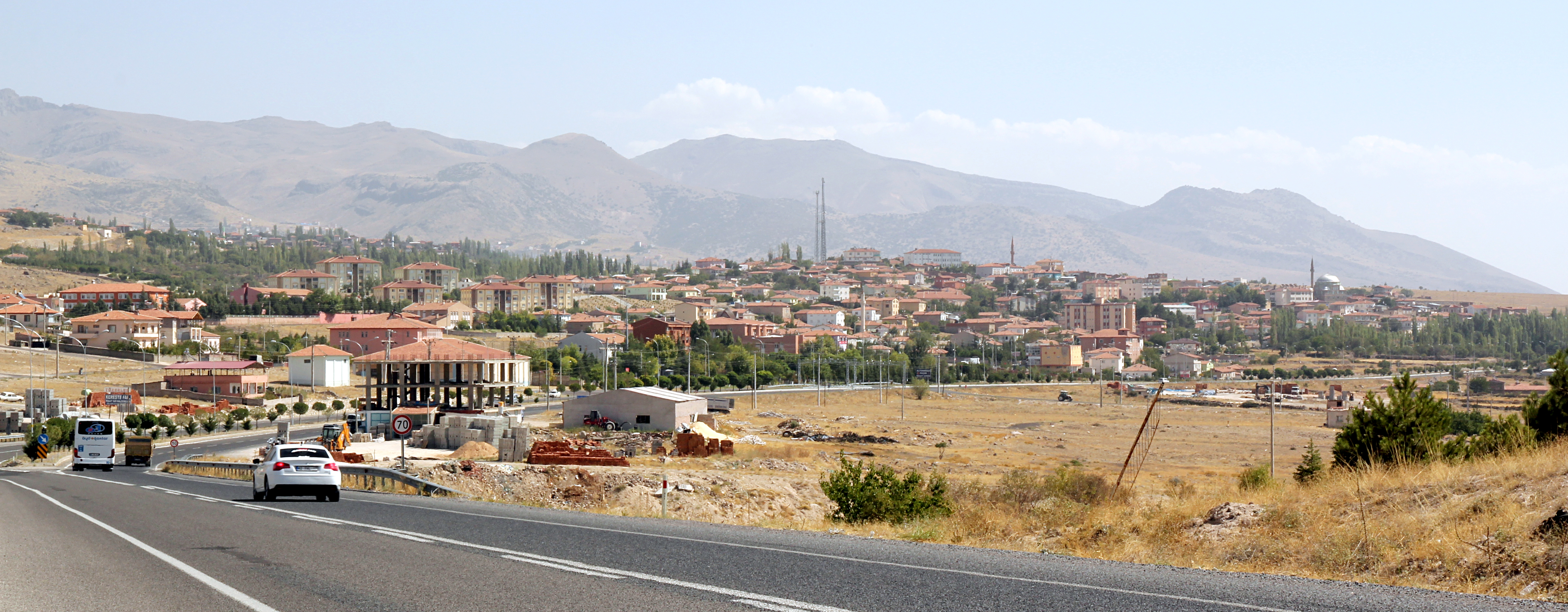
- General view of Altunhisar

- Location within Turkey Location within Turkey Central Anatolia
- Coordinates: 37°59′53″N 34°22′16″E
- Country: Turkey
- Province: Niğde
- District: Altunhisar

Government
  - Mayor: Neşet Doygun (AKP)
- Population (2022): 3,171
- Time zone: UTC+3 (TRT)
- Postal code: 51600
- Area code: 0388
- Website: altunhisar.bel.tr

Altunhisar is a town in Niğde Province in the Central Anatolia region of Turkey. It is the seat of Altunhisar District. Its population is 3,171 (2022).

Located on the Niğde plain to the north of the Melendiz mountains, 16 km for Bor and 30 km from the city of Niğde. Altunhisar is famous for its apples. The Cypriot company Unifrutti has invested heavily in the production of these and other fruits in the district.
