= Cappadocian Greeks =

Ethnic Greek subgroup

Έλληνες Καππαδόκες Kapadokyalı Rumlar
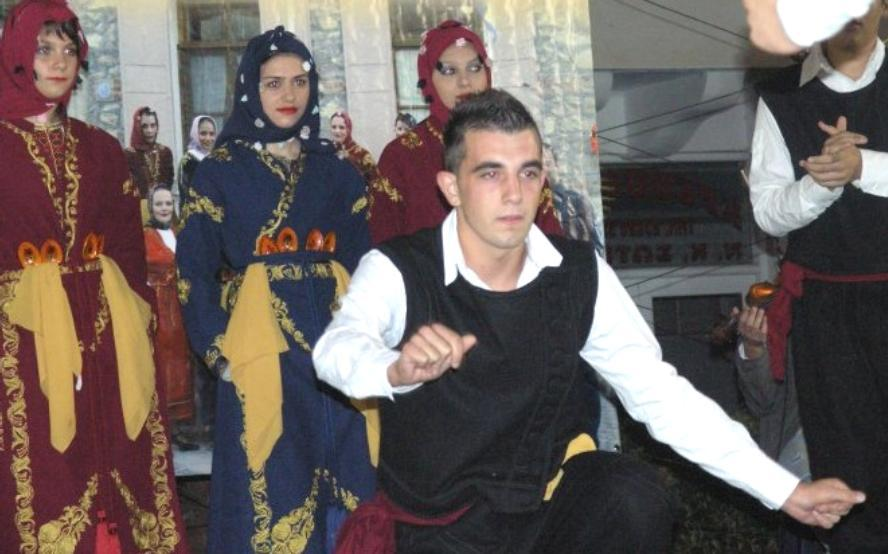
- Cappadocian Greeks in traditional clothing, Greece

Total population
- ~50,000

Regions with significant populations
- Greece (especially northern Greece)
- Greece: 44,432 (More than 50,000 including descendants) – around 50,000 (1920s estimate)

Languages
- Cappadocian Greek; Karamanli Turkish; Modern Greek

Religion
- Greek Orthodoxy

Related ethnic groups
- Other Asia Minor Greeks

The Cappadocian Greeks (Greek: Έλληνες Καππαδόκες; Turkish: Kapadokyalı Rumlar), or simply Cappadocians, are an ethnic Greek community native to the geographical region of Cappadocia in central-eastern Anatolia; roughly the Nevşehir, Kayseri, Konya provinces and their surroundings in modern-day Turkey. There had been a continuous Greek presence in Cappadocia since antiquity, and by at least the 5th century AD the Greek language had become the lingua franca of the region.

In the late 11th century, Seljuq Turks arriving from Central Asia conquered the region after the battle of Mantzikert, beginning its gradual shift in language and religion. In 1923, following the mass killing of Christian Ottomans across Anatolia, the surviving Cappadocian communities were forced to leave their native homeland and resettle in Greece by the terms of the Greek–Turkish population exchange. Today their descendants can be found throughout Greece and the Greek diaspora worldwide.

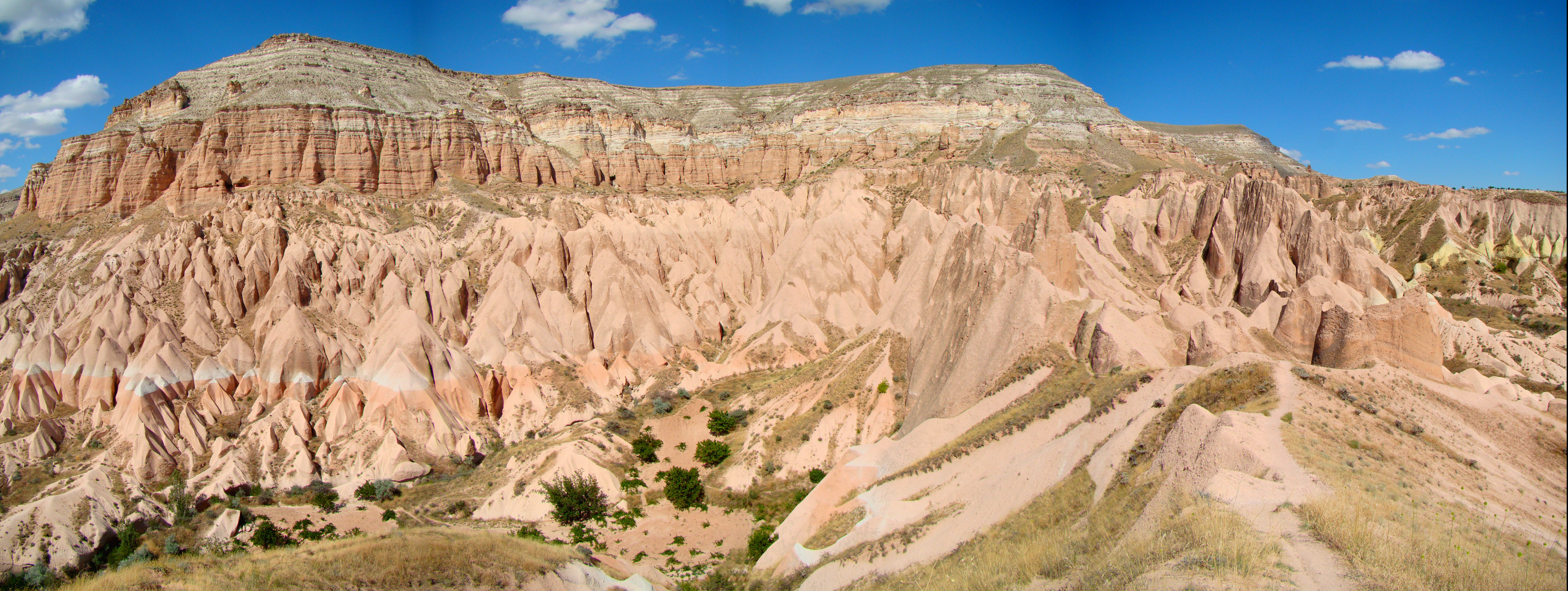
Mount Aktepe near Göreme and the Rock Sites of Cappadocia (UNESCO World Heritage Site)

== History ==
=== Early history ===
Before Greeks and Greek culture arrived in Asia Minor, the area was controlled by another Indo-European people, the Hittites. Mycenaean Greeks set up trading posts along the west coast around 1300 BC and soon started colonizing the coasts, spreading Hellenic culture and language.

The area known as Cappadocia today was known to the Ancient Persians as Katpatuka, a name which the Greeks altered into Καππαδοκία (Cappadocia). The word is essentially of unknown etymology, but some have argued that it means "the land of beautiful horses".

=== Hellenistic period ===
In the Hellenistic era, following the conquest of Anatolia by Alexander the Great, Greek settlers began arriving in the mountainous regions of Cappadocia at this time. This Greek population movement of the 3rd and 2nd centuries BC solidified a Greek presence in Cappadocia. As a result, Greek became the lingua franca of the region's natives. It would become the sole spoken language of the region's inhabitants within three centuries and would remain so for the next one thousand years.

After the death of Alexander the Great, Eumenes of Cardia, one of the Diadochi of Alexander the Great, was appointed satrap of Cappadocia, where he set up Greek settlements and distributed cities to his associates. Eumenes left behind administrators, judges and selected garrison commanders in Cappadocia. In the following centuries the Seleucid Greek Kings founded many Greek settlements in the interior of Asia Minor, and this region would become popular for the recruitment of soldiers. Unlike other regions of Asia Minor where Greeks would settle in cities, most of the Greek settlements in Cappadocia and other interior Anatolian regions were villages. The Hellenistic Kings would make new Greek settlements in Cappadocia and other surrounding regions in order to secure their hold on this volatile region; under their rule Greek settlements would increase in the Anatolian interior.

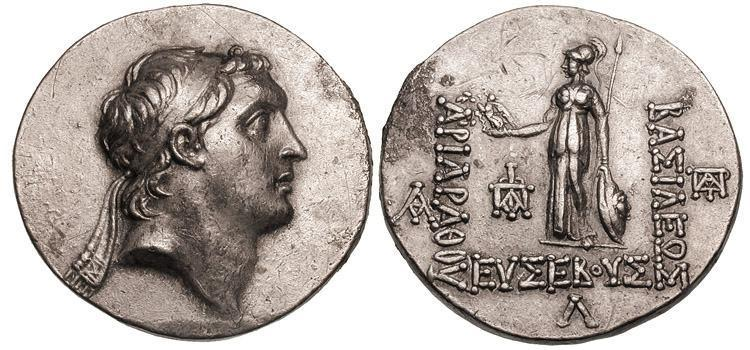
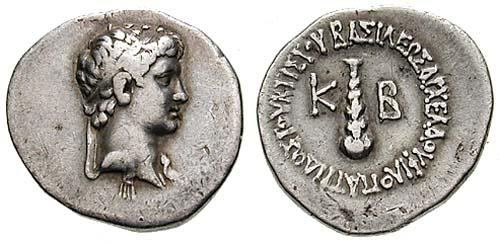
Kings of Cappadocia. (left) Ariarathes V of Cappadocia (ca. 163–130 BC) who is considered to have been the greatest king of Cappadocia and was predominantly Greek by descent. (right) Archelaus of Cappadocia (36 BC – 17 AD) was the last king of Cappadocia and was of Greek origin.

In the centuries following Alexander the Great's death, Ariarathes, the son of a Persian satrap who formerly controlled Cappadocia, gained control of the kingdom of Cappadocia and left it to a line of his successors, who mostly bore the name of the founder of the dynasty. These kings began to intermarry with neighboring Greek Hellenistic kingdoms, such as the Seleucids. During their reign Greek towns were beginning to appear in the southern regions of Cappadocia. Ariarathes V of Cappadocia who reigned from 163 to 130 BC is considered to have been the greatest of the Kings of Cappadocia. He was predominantly Greek by descent; his father Ariarathes IV of Cappadocia was half Greek Macedonian and Persian, and his mother was Antiochis, the daughter of the Seleucid Greek King Antiochus III of the Seleucid dynasty. By the 1st century BC, regions of Cappadocia had been ravaged by Armenian King Tigranes the Great, who had relocated a great number of Cilician and Cappadocian Greeks to Mesopotamia (geographically in modern Iraq, eastern Syria and south-eastern Turkey.)

Archelaus, who was a Roman client prince, was the last to rule as a king of Cappadocia. He was a Cappadocian Greek nobleman, possibly of Macedonian descent, and was the first king of Cappadocia of wholly non-Persian blood. He ruled over Cappadocia for many years before being deposed by Tiberius, who took possession of Cappadocia for Rome.

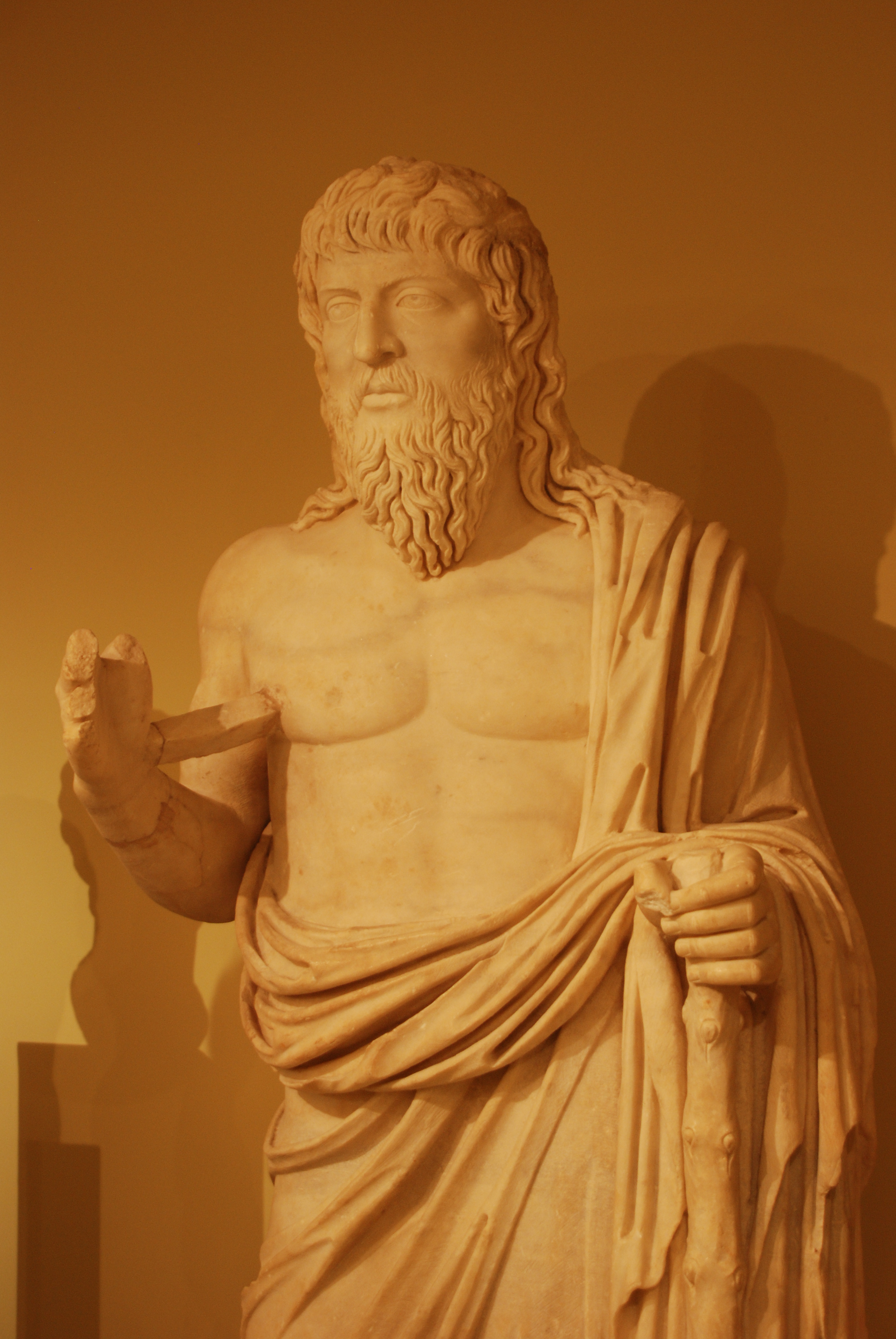
Apollonius of Tyana (1st century AD), a Greek Neopythagorean philosopher from the town of Tyana in Cappadocia

=== Roman and Byzantine period ===
The region of Cappadocia produced some notable Greek individuals in antiquity, such as Apollonius of Tyana (1st century AD) who was a Greek Neo-Pythagorean philosopher who became well known in the Roman Empire and Aretaeus of Cappadocia (81–138 AD) who was a native Greek, born in Cappadocia and is considered to have been one of the foremost surgeons in antiquity. He was the first to distinguish between diabetes mellitus and diabetes insipidus, and the first to provide a detailed description of an asthma attack.

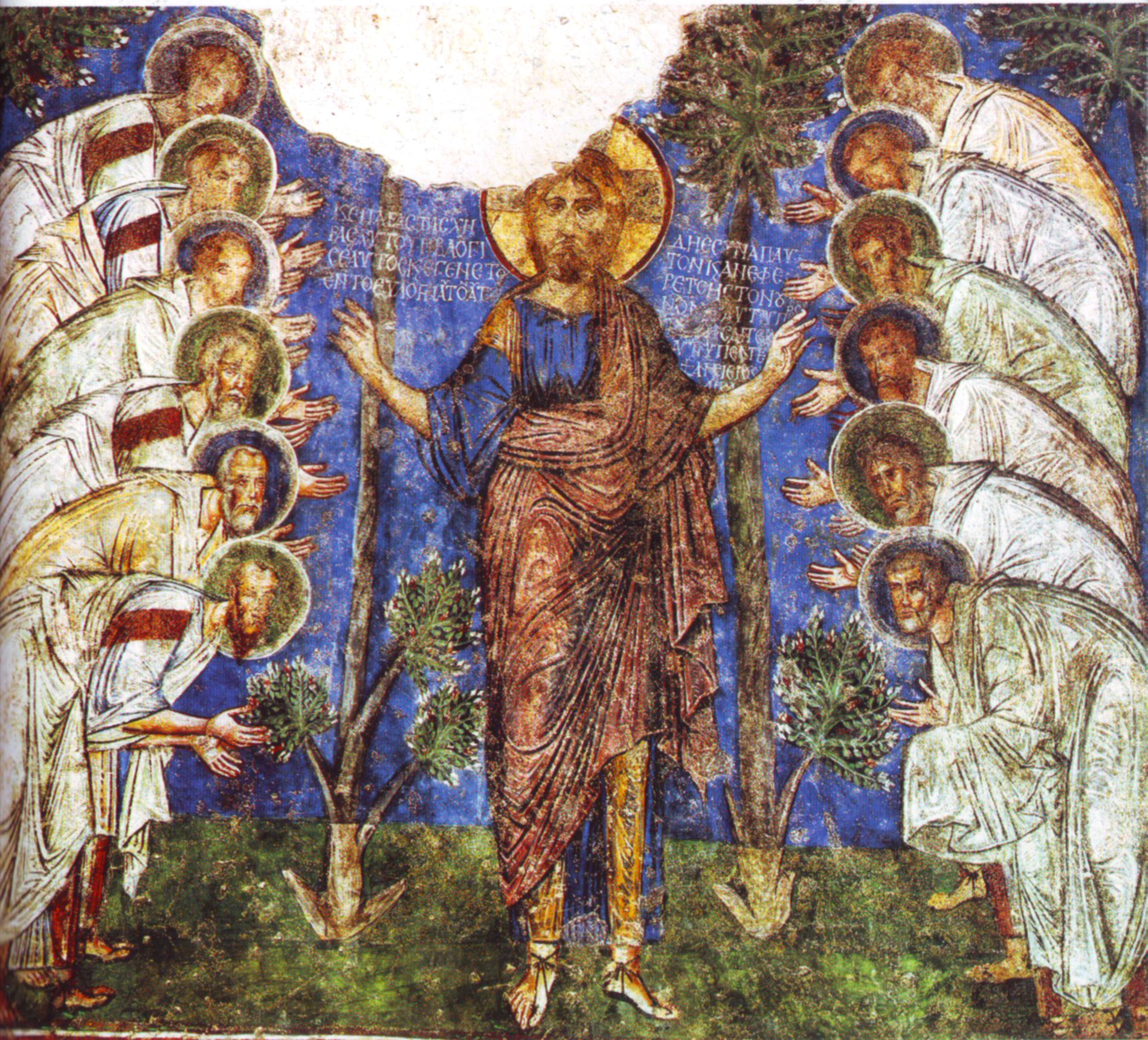
Medieval Byzantine fresco in a Cappadocian rock-cut church at Göreme depicting Jesus Christ with the twelve apostles

By late antiquity the Cappadocian Greeks had largely converted to Christianity. They were so thoroughly devout to Christianity that by the 1st century AD, the region of Cappadocia served as a stronghold for Christian Monasticism and was of significant importance in the history of early Christianity. In the early centuries of the Common Era Cappadocia produced three prominent Greek patristic figures, known as the Cappadocian Fathers. They were Basil the Great (c. 330–79), Bishop of Caesarea in Cappadocia. Gregory of Nazianzus (c. 330–c. 389) (later known as Saint Gregory the Theologian) and Gregory of Nyssa (died c. 394). These Cappadocian Greek fathers of the fourth century revered the ancient Greek cultural pursuit of virtue, even studying Homer and Hesiod and "stood squarely in the tradition of Greek culture".

By the fifth century the last of the Indo-European native languages of Anatolia ceased to be spoken, replaced by Koine Greek. At the same time the Greek communities of central Anatolia were becoming actively involved in affairs of the Eastern Roman Empire and some Greek Cappadocians such as Maurice Tiberius (r. 582–602) and Heraclius would even serve as Emperors.

The region became a key Byzantine military district after the advent of Islam and the subsequent Muslim conquest of Syria led to the establishment of a militarized frontier zone (cf kleisoura and thughur) on the border of Cappadocia. This lasted from the mid-7th to the 10th century during the Arab–Byzantine wars, immortalized in Digenis Akritas, the Medieval Greek heroic epic set in this frontier region. During this period, Cappadocia became crucial to the empire and produced numerous Byzantine generals, most notably the Phokas and Maleinos clans (see Nikephoros Phokas and his nephew John Tzimiskes), warlords (see Karbeas of Tephrike), and intrigue, most importantly the Paulician heresy. Because they were living in such a volatile region, the Cappadocian Greeks created elaborate underground cities in the volcanic formations of eastern Cappadocia and would take refuge in them during times of danger. The Cappadocian Greeks hid in these rock-cut underground towns from many raiders over the next millennium, from 9th century Arab invaders to 11th century Turkish conquerors to 15th century Mongols. As late as the 20th century the local Cappadocian Greeks were still using the underground cities as refuges (Greek: καταφύγια) from periodic waves of Ottoman persecution. The most famous of these ancient underground cities are at the Cappadocian Greek villages of Anaku-Inegi (Ανακού) and Malakopi-Melagob (Μαλακοπή). The Greeks were removed from these villages in 1923, and they are now known as Derinkuyu and Kaymakli. These underground cities have chambers extending to depths of over 80 meters.

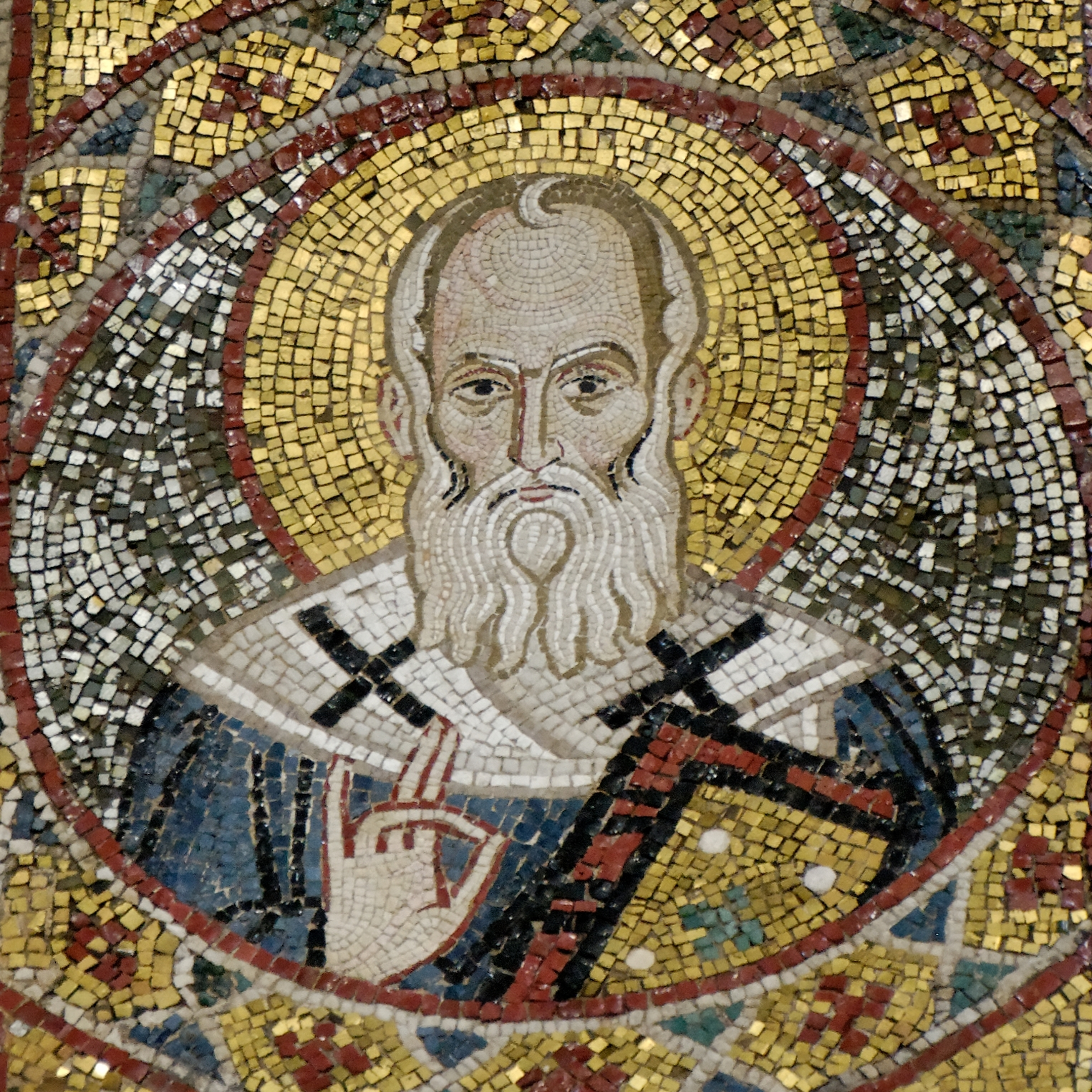
Gregory of Nazianzus (c. 330-c. 389 AD)

In the Middle Ages Cappadocia had hundreds of settlements and Byzantine rock-cut churches were carved out of the volcanic formations of eastern Cappadocia and decorated with painted icons, Greek writing and decorations. Over 700 of these Churches have been discovered and date from the period between the 6th century to the 13th century, many of these monasteries and churches continued to be used until the population exchange between Greece and Turkey 1920s.

The Greek inhabitants of these districts of Cappadocia were called Troglodytes. In the 10th century Leo the Deacon recorded a journey to Cappadocia by Nikephoros Phokas, in his writings he mentions that its inhabitants were called Troglodytes, as they “went underground in holes, clefts and labyrinths, as it were in dens and burrows”.

Byzantines re-established control of Cappadocia between the 7th and 11th centuries. During this period churches were carved into cliffs and rock faces in the Göreme and Soğanlı region. In the Middle Ages the Cappadocian Greeks would bury their religious figures in and around monasteries. In recent years mummified bodies have been found in abandoned Greek monasteries of Cappadocia, and many, including bodies of mummified babies, are on display in the Nigde Archaeological Museum. A well-preserved mummified corpse of a young Christian woman is popular with tourists; the blonde haired mummy is believed to be a nun and dates from the Byzantine era, from the 6th to the 11th century. It was discovered in a sixth-century Greek chapel in the Ihlara Valley of Cappadocia.

During the tenth century the Byzantine Empire had pushed east into formerly Arab-ruled lands, including most of Armenia, and had resettled thousands of Armenians into various regions of Cappadocia. This population shift intensified ethnic tensions between the Cappadocian Greeks and the Armenian newcomers in Cappadocia, and left Armenia largely devoid of native defenders.

=== Seljuk period ===
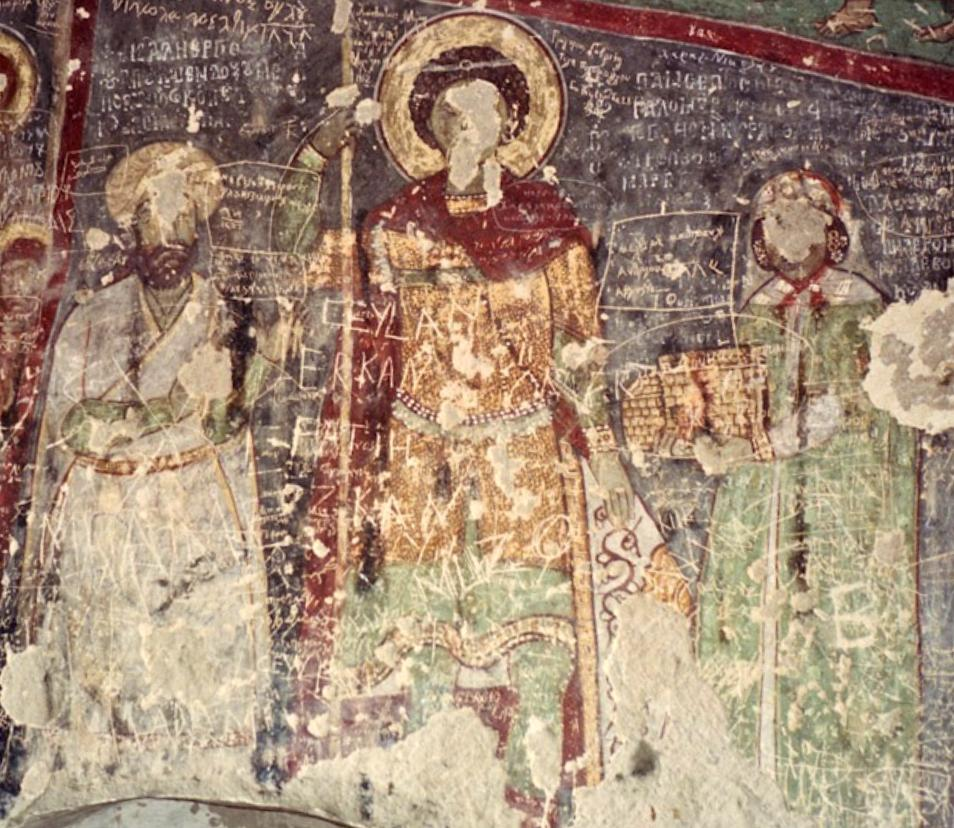
Basil Giagoupes (Bασίλειος Γιαγούπης), a 13th-century Cappadocian Greek feudatory lord who held the court title of general (amir arzi) in the army of Mesud II, Sultan of the Seljuk Sultanate of Rum.

In 1071 AD the Byzantine Empire suffered a considerable defeat at the Battle of Manzikert in Armenia. This defeat would open the interior of Anatolia to invasion by Central Asian Seljuq Turks who would overrun most of Byzantine Asia Minor. This began the transformation of Asia Minor from an entirely Christian and overwhelmingly Greek-populated region to a primarily Muslim and Turkish center. Several Armenian royal families, which included Gagik of Ani and Adom and Abu Sahl of Vaspurakan, sought vengeance on the local Greek Orthodox population after persecutions of the Armenians and Syriac Monophysites by the Byzantines. They used the opportunity provided by the Seljuq conquest to target the Greeks, they tortured and then assassinated the Greek Orthodox metropolitan of Kayseri and pillaged wealthy Greek owned estates. The local Greek landowners eventually killed the Armenian royal Gagik.

By the 12th century all of Anatolia was overrun by Turkmen tribes from Central Asia, these invading nomads had cleared many regions of Anatolia of indigenous Greeks. The Anatolian Greek population rapidly diminished under Turkish rule owing to mass conversions to Islam, slaughter or exile to Greek territories in Europe. Before the Turkish migration into Anatolia, Greeks as well as smaller numbers of Armenians, Syrians, and Georgians were all Christians, but by the 15th century more than 90% of Anatolia was Muslim, according to some researchers largely because of Christian conversions to Islam. Many Byzantine Greek leaders were also tempted to convert to Islam in order to join the Ottoman Turkish aristocracy, although in the beginning of the 20th century, the proportion of Christians in Anatolian population was more than 20%. During the centuries of Turkish rule in Asia Minor many Greeks and other peoples of Anatolia such as Armenians and Kurds adopted the Turkish language, converted to Islam, and came to be identified as Turks. Despite the turmoil in Anatolia, by the 13th century the Greeks of Cappadocia, Lycaonia and Pamphylia remained numerous, even under the pressure of the Turkmen nomads, possibly constituting majorities in some urban centers. During this chaotic period there is evidence that some native Cappadocian Greeks had joined the invading Turkish nomads. Some even managing to rise to levels of prominence in the Seljuq Sultanate of Rum, such as Basil Giagoupes (Bασίλειος Γιαγούπης), a wealthy Cappadocian Greek feudatory lord of a strongly Greek district who held the court title of general (amir arzi) in the army of the Seljuq sultan of Konya, Mesud II. He dedicated a church in the Peristrema (Belisırma) valley where his portrait, which was painted from life still survives to this day. 13th century Cappadocian Greek artists were renowned for their naturalistic paintings and were employed throughout the Seljuk Empire. Cappadocian Greeks were also employed as architects, such as Kalo Yianni, who was commissioned to build the Gök Medrese (Sivas) in 1271.

=== Ottoman period ===
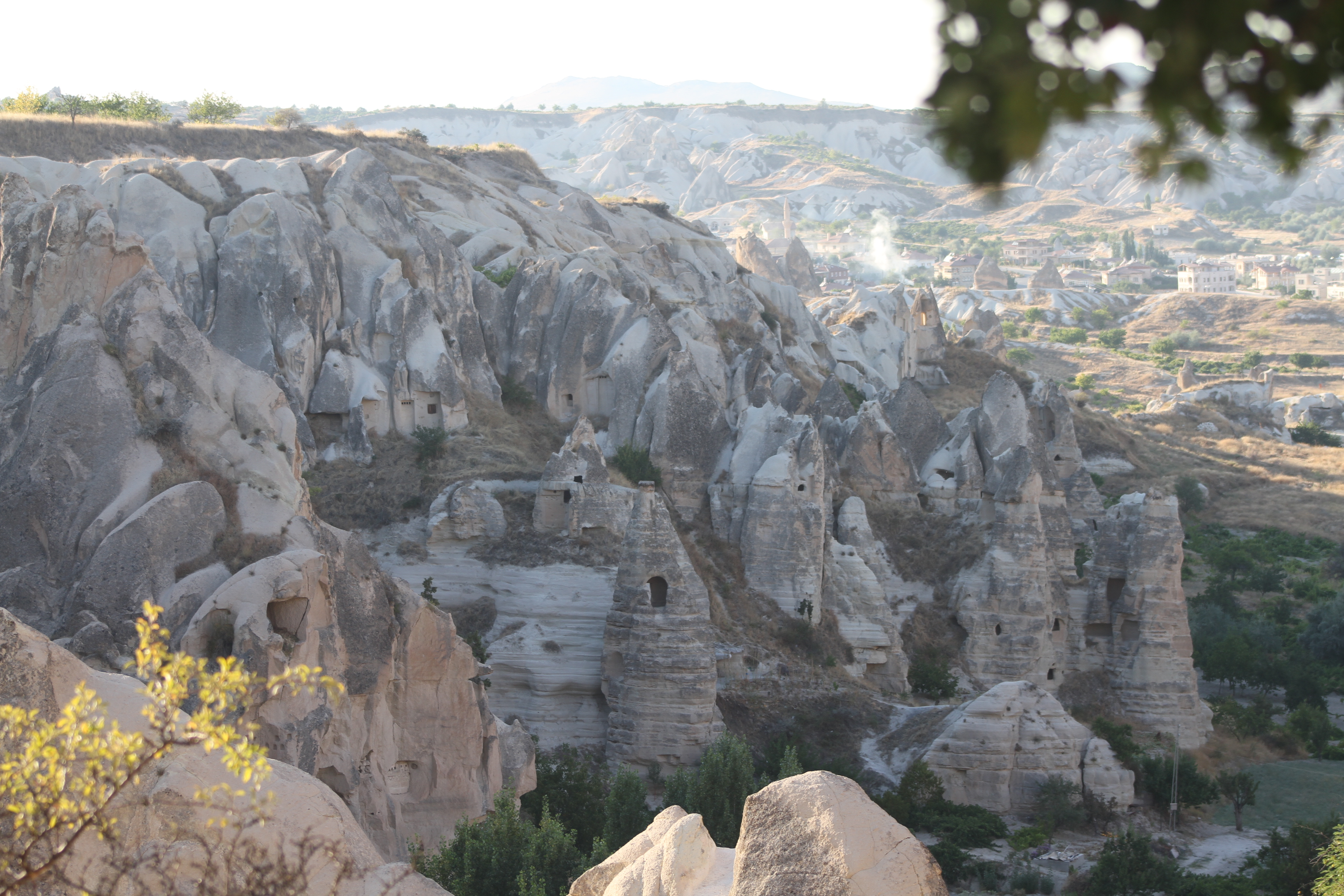
Abandoned Greek Orthodox churches carved into a solid stone cliff face, Göreme Open Air Museum, Cappadocia, Nevşehir/Turkey.

Over the course of the 15th century the Ottoman Turks conquered Cappadocia from the Seljuk Turks, the Cappadocian countryside remained largely Greek populated, with a smaller Armenian population even after the Ottoman conquest. During the reign of Ottoman Sultan Murad III (1574 to 1595) the region of Cappadocia became largely Turkified in culture and language through a gradual process of acculturation, as a result many Greeks of Anatolia had accepted the Turkish vernacular and some of whom later became known as Karamanlides. This name derives from the city called Karaman by the Turks in honor of the Turkish chieftain Karamanoglu, though the Greeks continued to call the region Laranda, its ancient Greek name. These Turcophone Greeks lived primarily in the region of Karamania although there were also significant communities in Constantinople and in the region of the Black Sea. Cappadocian Greeks living in remote less accessible villages of Cappadocia remained Greek-speaking and Christian, as they were isolated and consequently less affected by the rapid conversion of the bordering districts to Islam and Turkish speech. The Greek Cappadocians retained the original Greek names of many regions of Cappadocia which were renamed Turkish names during the Ottoman era, such as the town known as ‘Hagios Prokopios’ in the Middle Ages, and renamed ‘Urgup’ by the Turks was still called ‘Prokopion’ by the local Greeks of the early 20th century.

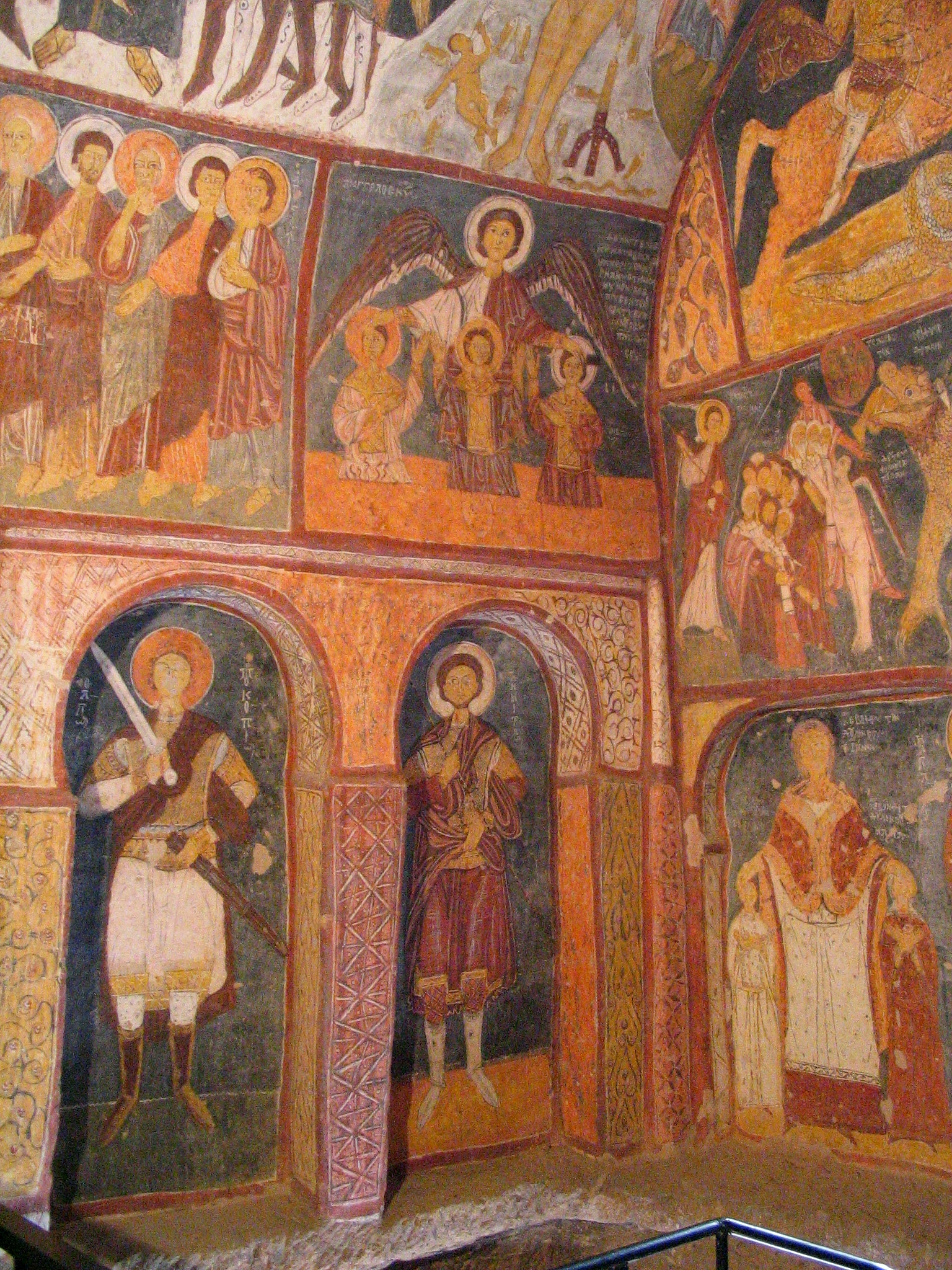
Frescoes in St. John (Gülşehir) Church, Cappadocia, Turkey.

Although the Karamanlides abandoned Greek when they learned Turkish, they remained Greek Orthodox Christians and continued to write using the Greek alphabet. They printed manuscript works in the Turkish language using the Greek alphabet, which became known as ‘Karamanlidika’. This was not a phenomenon that was limited to the Cappadocian Greeks, as many of the Armenians living in Cappadocia were also linguistically Turkified, although they remained Armenian Apostolic (Orthodox) Christians, they spoke and wrote in the Turkish language although still using the Armenian alphabet. Some Jewish inhabitants of the Ottoman Empire were also Turkified and although they retained their religion, they also wrote in the Turkish language but using Hebrew script. The Cappadocian Greeks, Armenians and Jewish minorities of the Ottoman Empire had created Graeco-Turkish, Armeno-Turkish, and Judeo-Turkish literatures by developing their own written traditions. Despite the fact that they had lost all knowledge of their own languages after they had been Turkified, the majority of Karamanlides and many Turkophone Armenians eventually revived their original native tongues. While most Cappadocian Greeks had remained Orthodox Christians a significant number of the Karamanlides even converted to Islam during this period. As with other Greek communities, these converts to Islam were considered "Turks", as being a Muslim was synonymous with being Turkish to the Greeks of the Ottoman Empire. Greek writers would erroneously describe Greek converts to Islam as tourkeuoun (τουρκεύουν) 'becoming Turks'. European visitors to the sultans' realms would also subjectively label any Muslim a "Turk" regardless of his or her mother tongue. The Greeks believed that by converting to Islam and losing his or her original Christian religion, the individual was also stepping out of the Greek national community. This way of thinking was even popular years after the dissolution of the Ottoman Empire.

Many shifts of population took place in central Anatolia during the period of Ottoman rule. Subsequent to the 1571 Ottoman conquest of Cyprus, the Ottoman Sultan Selim II decided to transfer Greeks from Cappadocia, particularly from the Kayseri region, to Cyprus. During this period the architect Sinan, who was born of Greek parentage and a native of Cappadocia wrote a letter to the Sultan asking for his family to be spared from this population transfer. During the Ottoman era, Cappadocian Greeks would migrate to Constantinople and other large cities to do business. By the 19th century, many were wealthy, educated and westernized. Wealthy Cappadocian Greek businessmen built large stone mansions in regions of Cappadocia such as Karvali (modern Güzelyurt) many of which can still be seen today. The Cappadocian Greeks wrote the earliest published novels in the Ottoman Empire in the 19th century, using the Greek Alphabet and Turkish language. Cappadocian Greeks from different regions would specialize in a particular profession, such as the caviar trade. Demetrius Charles Boulger later describes their work character, "Each village is connected with some particular guild in Constantinople; one supplies bakals or small storekeepers, another sellers of wine and spirits, another dryers of fish, another makers of caviare, another porters, and so forth."’

=== Modern period ===
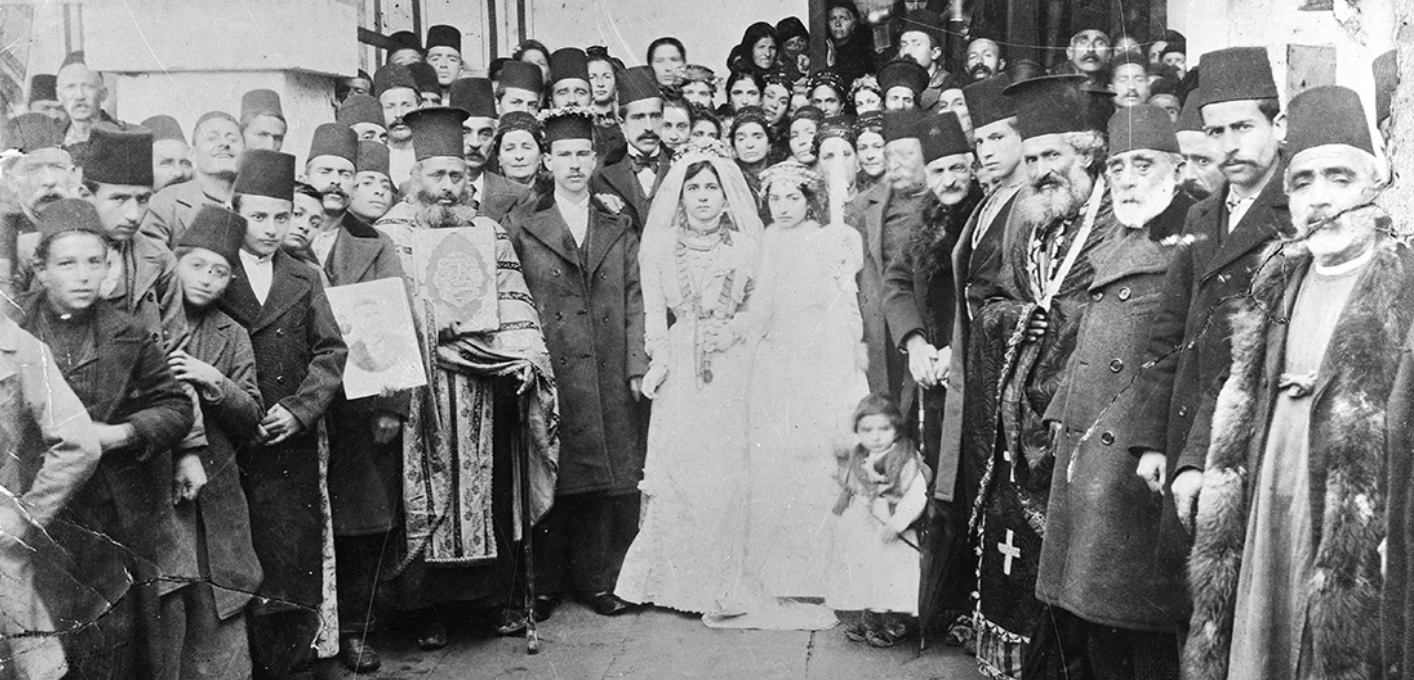
A Cappadocian Greek wedding in Kermira (Germir), Kayseri, Cappadocia, in 1902.

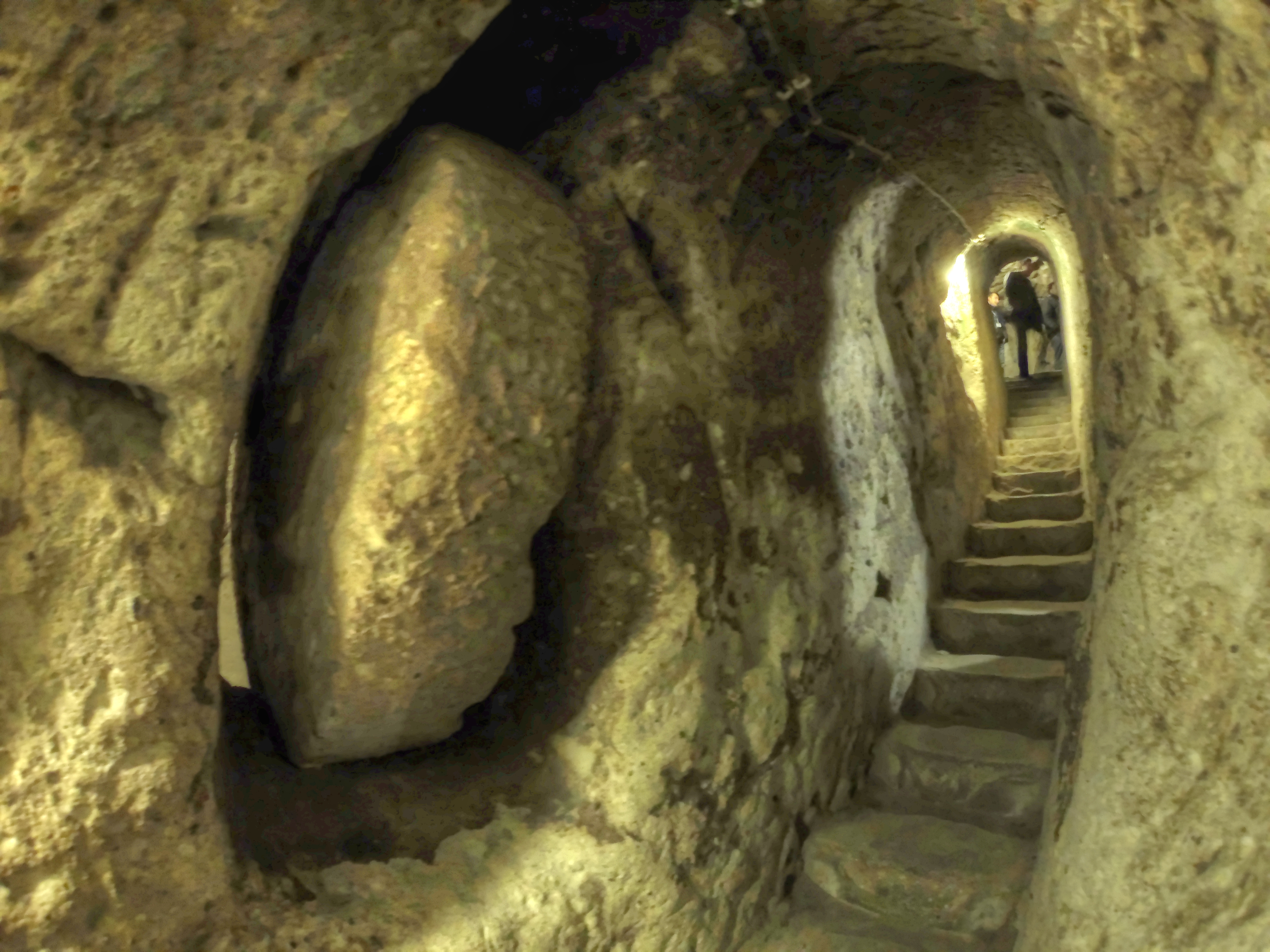
A passage in the Underground City

In the early 20th century, Greek settlements were still both numerous and widespread throughout most of today’s Turkey. The provinces of Cappadocia and Lycaonia had a large number of Greek settlements and sizeable populations in urban centres such as Kayseri, Nigde, and Konya. According to 1897 estimations, the sanjak of Konya had a total Greek population of 68.101 (6.6%) and according to Ottoman population statistics of 1914, the sanjak of Niğde had a total Greek population of 58.312 (20%) and the sanjak of Kayseri had a total of 26.590 (10,1%). The Cappadocian Greeks of the 19th and 20th centuries were renowned for the richness of their folktales and preservation of their ancient Greek tongue.

The underground cities continued to be used as refuges (Cappadocian Greek: καταφύγια) from the Turkish Muslim rulers. As late as the 20th century the locals were still using the underground cities to escape periodic waves of Ottoman persecution. Dawkins, a Cambridge linguist who conducted research on the Cappodocian Greek natives in the area from 1909–1911, recorded that in 1909,

when the news came of the recent massacres at Adana, a great part of the population at Axo took refuge in these underground chambers, and for some nights did not venture to sleep above ground.

Scholars passing through Cappadocia during the 19th century described the Cappadocian Greeks and their habits. In 1838 British scholar Robert Ainsworth wrote that "The Cappadocian Greeks are, generally speaking, pleasing and unreserved in their manners, and their conversation indicated a very high degree of intelligence and civilization, where there are so few books, and so little education, and consequently, little learning." Sir Charles William Wilson, British consul-general in Anatolia from 1879 to 1882, described their character:

The Cappadocian Greeks have a reputation throughout Asia Minor for energy and commercial activity; there are few towns in which a merchant from Kaisariyeh is not to be found; and the rocky nature of the country drives even the poorer classes to seek their living elsewhere. Perhaps the most interesting trait in the character of these Greeks is their intense love of their native country; the great ambition of every man is to earn sufficient money to enable him to build a house and settle down in his beloved Cappadocia. The young men go off to Constantinople for a few years, and then return to marry and build a house; a couple of years of married life sees the end of their savings, and they have to revisit the capital, sometimes remaining there ten or fifteen years, to earn sufficient to support themselves and their wives for the remainder of their lives…The people have no marked political aspirations such as those which prevail amongst the Greeks of the west coast; they dream, it is true, of a new Byzantine Empire, but any sympathies they can spare from an all-absorbing love of money and gain are devoted to the Russian. The south Cappadocian district, in which St. Gregory of Nazianzus once ministered, shows many signs of growing prosperity; building is going on, and the people are vacating, for houses above ground, the subterranean villages, to which they owe the preservation of their faith and language. These villages are known by Greek as well as by Turkish names; in some Greek is spoken by Moslem and Christian, in others a Graeco-Turk jargon, and in others Turkish only; and this mixture is found even in the churches, where the descriptive remarks on the holy pictures are often in Turkish written in Greek characters.

=== Persecution and population exchange ===
By the early 1900s the region of Cappadocia was still inhabited by Christian Cappadocian Greeks as well as Muslim Turks and also communities of Armenians and Kurds. By the beginning of the First World War, the Greeks of Anatolia were besieged by the Young Turks. Thousands of Greeks were massacred, approximately 750,000 Anatolian Greeks were massacred in an act of Genocide and 750,000 exiled. The Greeks were targeted prior to and alongside the Armenians and Assyrians. Ionian and Cappadocian Greek deaths alone totaled 397,000, while Pontian Greek deaths numbered 353,000 people. Turkish official Rafet Bey was active in the Genocide of the Greeks of the Anatolian interior, in November 1916 he stated "We must finish off the Greeks as we did with the Armenians ... today I sent squads to the interior to kill every Greek on sight ..." During the Greco-Turkish War (1919–1922) countless numbers of Greeks were deported by the Turks to the Mesopotamian desert where many perished. On January 31, 1917, Chancellor Theobald von Bethmann-Hollweg of Germany reported that:

The indications are that the Turks plan to eliminate the Greek element as enemies of the state, as they did earlier with the Armenians. The strategy implemented by the Turks is of displacing people to the interior without taking measures for their survival by exposing them to death, hunger, and illness. The abandoned homes are then looted and burnt or destroyed. Whatever was done to the Armenians is being repeated with the Greeks.

In 1924, after living in Cappadocia for thousands of years, the remaining Cappadocian Greeks were expelled to Greece as part of the population exchange between Greece and Turkey defined by the Treaty of Lausanne, the descendants of the Cappadocian Greeks who had converted to Islam were not included in the population exchange and remained in Cappadocia, some still speaking the Cappadocian Greek language. Many Cappadocian towns were greatly affected by the expulsion of the Greeks including Mustafapaşa (Sinasos), Ürgüp, Güzelyurt and Nevşehir as the Greeks constituted a significant percentage of the towns population. The Cappadocian Greeks were taken to the coastal town of Mersin in order to be shipped to Greece. Many would lose all of their belongings due to corrupt officials and looters. The Cappadocian Greeks who were migrating from Cappadocia were replaced by Muslims migrating from mainland Greece, mainly from Thrace; some of these Muslims were Greeks (see Greek Muslims), although most were of Slavic, Turkish and Gypsy origin. Many of the Cappadocian Greek churches were converted to mosques after the Greeks left in the population exchange of the 1920s. These include the Church of St Gregory known today as "Buyuk Kilise Camii (Big Church Mosque)".

During the population exchange, 44,432 Cappadocian Greeks refugees in total relocated to Greece in 1924; according to a 1924 census covering 61 out of their 74–81 settlements, 22,027 of them came from 39 Turkish-speaking communities, while another 17,590 came from 22 Greek-speaking communities. According to a fuller estimate, inner Asia Minor had 46,462 Greek Orthodox inhabitants, of whom 23,688 were Turkish-speaking and 22,774 Greek-speaking (Cappadocian, Pharasiot, Silliot, and Pontic).

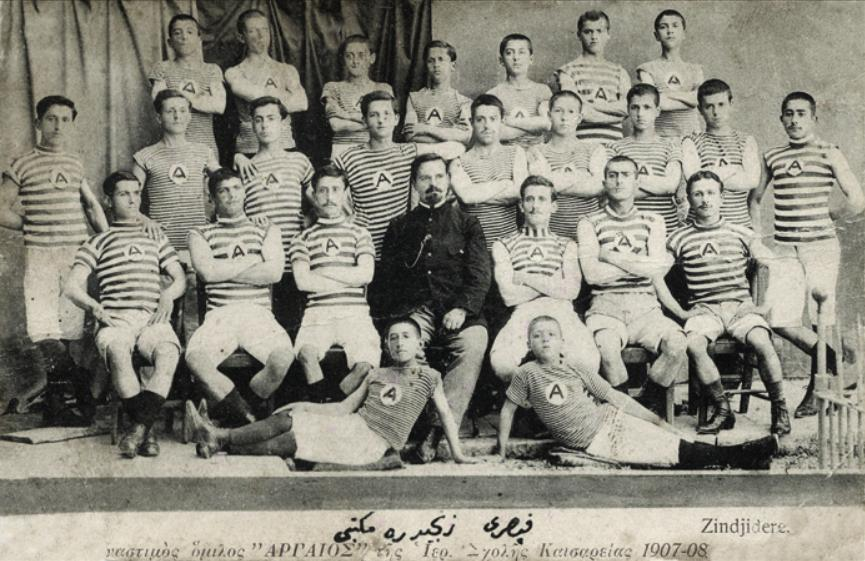
Cappadocian Greek athletic seminary team "Argaios" in Kayseri (1907). The team was named after Mt. Argaios, a famous volcano in Cappadocia.

Following the population exchange there was still a substantial community of Cappadocian Greeks living in Turkey, in Constantinople, they had settled there during the Ottoman era and formed enclaves of their native communities, the majority of whom also migrated to Greece following the Anti-Greek Istanbul Pogrom riots of 1955. On their arrival in mainland Greece, many Cappadocian Greeks settled in villages similar to their original Cappadocian villages; the new settlements were named after towns and villages left behind in Cappadocia, with the addition of the word “Nea” (New). For example, Cappadocian Greeks from Sinasos (present Mustafapaşa near Ürgüp) who settled in the northern part of the island of Euboea in Greece named their new settlement Nea Sinasos "New Sinasos". Other examples include Nea Karvali in northern Greece, and Neo Prokopi in central Greece. The regions of Greece with significant settlements of Cappadocian Greeks include the cities of Karditsa, Volos, Kilkis, Larisa, Chalkidiki, Kavala, Alexandroupoli and Thessaloniki. Today the descendants of the Cappadocian Greeks can be found throughout Greece, as well as in countries around the world particularly in Western Europe, North America and Australia as part of the Greek diaspora.

The modern region of Cappadocia is famous for the churches carved into cliffs and rock faces in the Göreme and Soğanlı valleys. The region is popular with tourists, many of whom visit the abandoned underground cities, houses and Greek churches carved and decorated by Cappadocian Greeks centuries ago. The formerly Greek town of Güzelyurt (Karvali) has become popular with tourists who visit the abandoned stone mansions built centuries ago by wealthy Cappadocian Greek businessmen. Today, more than 700 Greek Orthodox churches and over thirty rock-carved chapels, many with preserved painted icons, Greek writing and frescos, some from the pre-iconoclastic period that date back as far as the 6th century, can still be seen. As of 1985 these Greek cave churches were designated a UNESCO World Heritage Site.

== Language ==
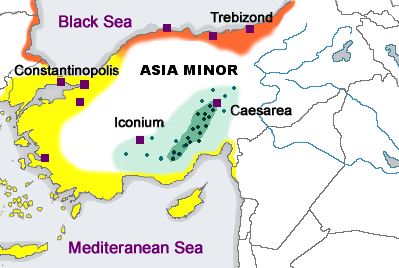
Anatolian Greek dialects until 1923. Demotic in yellow. Pontic in orange. Cappadocian in green, with green dots indicating individual Cappadocian Greek speaking villages in 1910.

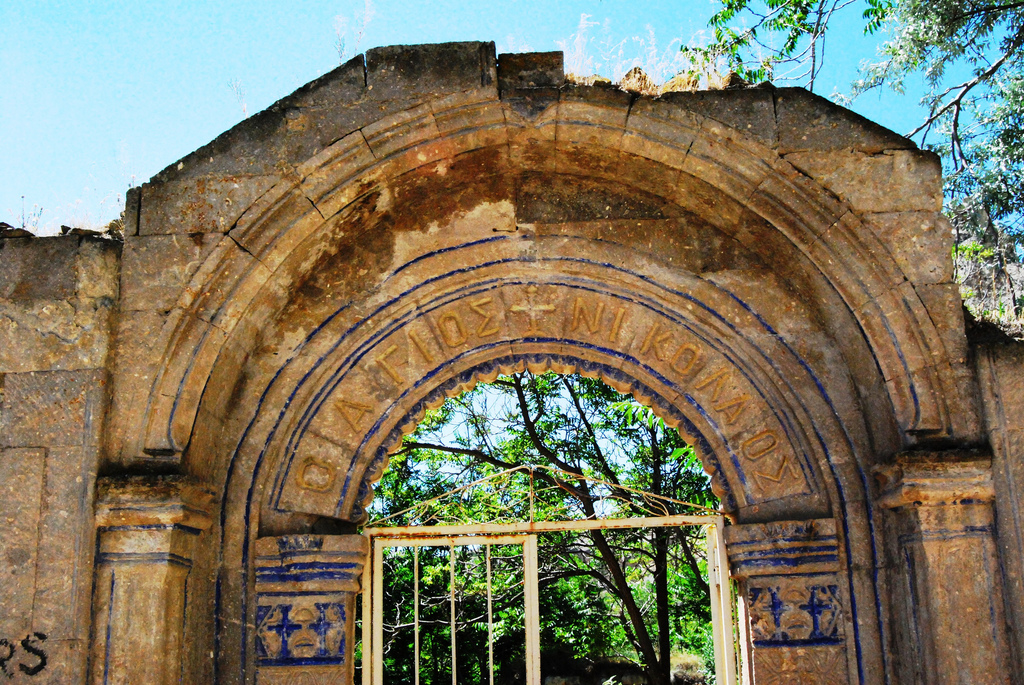
Greek inscription in Mustafapaşa, Nevşehir

The Cappadocian Greeks traditionally spoke a dialect of the Greek language known as Cappadocian Greek. Cappadocian Greek diverged from the other Byzantine Greek dialects early, beginning with the Turkish conquests of central Asia Minor in the 11th and 12th centuries, and so developed several radical features, such as the loss of the gender for nouns. However, having been isolated from the crusader conquests (Fourth Crusade) and the later Venetian influence of the Greek coast, it retained the Ancient Greek terms for many words that were replaced with Romance language ones in Demotic Greek. After centuries of Ottoman rule the Turkish language began to emerge as the dominant language of Cappadocia. Many Greeks began to speak Turkish as a second language and became bilingual; this was the case with the Kouvoukliotes, who were always Greek speakers and spoke Turkish with a strong Greek accent. At the beginning of the 20th century, the Cappadocian Greek language still had a strong presence at Gülşehir (formerly Arabison/Arapsu) north-west of Nevşehir, and in the large region southward as far down as Niğde and Bor. Greek was also still spoken at Silli north-west of Konya, in Pharasa (today Çamlıca village in Yahyalı district) and other villages in isolated communities in the interior of central Turkey prior to the Genocide of 1915 and subsequent population transfers. Many Cappadocian Greeks completely abandoned Greek when they learned Turkish, although in the western regions of Cappadocia many Greeks still retained their native language. John Robert Sitlington Sterrett travelled through Cappadocia in 1884 and noted: "Melegobi is a large and flourishing village, inhabited almost exclusively by Greek-speaking Greeks. The Greeks are numerous all through the western part of Cappadocia, and generally cling to their language with great tenacity, a fact worthy of notice, inasmuch as the Greeks in other parts of Asia Minor speak only Turkish. Instances of Greek-speaking towns are Niğde, Gelvere, Melegobi (Μελοκοπια), and Ortaköy in Soğanlı Deresi." During the 19th-century, British scholar John Pinkerton was informed by the Turkish-speaking Greeks that past Turkish rulers of Anatolia had caused them to lose the knowledge of the Greek language, Pinkerton reported that:

... the cruel persecutions of their Mahomedan masters have been the cause of their present degraded state of ignorance, even in regard to their native tongue; for that there was a time when their Turkish masters strictly prohibited the Greeks in Asia Minor even from speaking the Greek language among themselves, and that they cut out the tongues of some, and punished others with death, who dared to disobey this their barbarous command. It is an indisputable fact, that the language of their oppressors has long since almost universally prevailed, and that in a great part of Anatolia even the public worship of the Greeks is now performed in the Turkish tongue. The following works, in the Turkish language, but all in the Greek character, afford further proof of what I have now stated ... (John Pinkerton, 1817)

In the 1920s when the Cappadocian Greeks arrived in Greece, the Cappadocian Greek spoken by them was hardly intelligible with the Demotic Greek used in mainland Greece, as it had been cut off from the rest of the Greek-speaking world for centuries. The Cappadocian Greeks were more linguistically Turkified than the Greeks in Pontus and the western coastal regions of Turkey. Once in Greece though, they started using the modern Greek language, causing their ancestral Greek dialect, the Cappadocian Greek language, to go to the brink of extinction. The Cappadocian Greek language was believed by some scholars to have been extinct for many years. The language was then declared alive in 2005, when descendants of Cappadocian Greeks were discovered still speaking the language fluently in central and northern Greece. Today it is still spoken by mainly elderly Cappadocian Greeks in various regions of Greece including in Karditsa, Volos, Kilkis, Larisa, Thessaloniki, Chalkidiki, Kavala, and Alexandroupoli. Some Cappadocian Greeks who converted to Islam, allowing them to avoid the population exchanges of 1923, still speak the language in their traditional homeland in Turkey.

== Culture ==
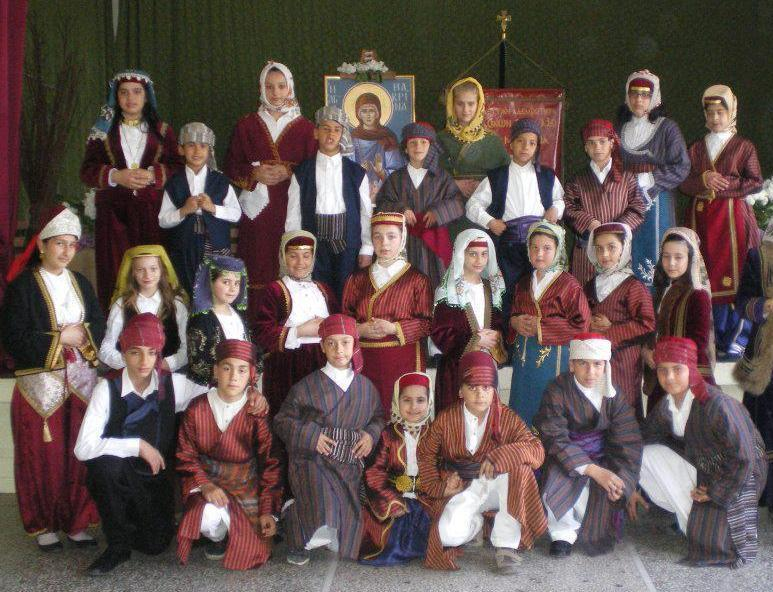
Cappadocian Greek children wearing traditional costumes in Greece.

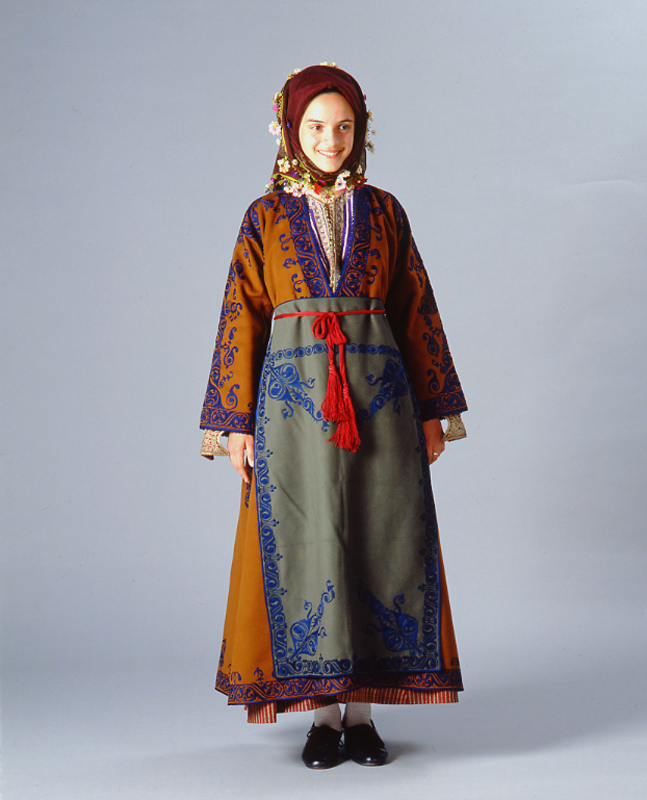
Female traditional costume from Niğde (PFF Collection, Nafplion).

The Cappadocian Greeks have been isolated from the rest of the Greek-speaking world for centuries and this has made their culture, way of life, and customs somewhat distinctive. Their culture has been strongly influenced by the topography of its different regions. In the middle of the 18th century, after the Hatt-i humayun, the Greek feeling was stimulated, more schools were founded in the area and Greek was taught above. In commercial cities like Kayseri and Malakopea upper-level education and arts flourished under the protection of a cosmopolitan middle class. The economy of Cappadocia was largely based upon agriculture and mining and the rural centers which lay upon the valleys and plains. The Cappadocian Greeks have distinctive traditional songs and dances which are still performed in Greece.

=== Literature ===
==== Early ====
The Persian poet Rumi (1207–1273), whose name means "Roman", referring to his residence amongst the "Roman" Greek speakers of Cappadocia, wrote a few poems in Cappadocian Greek. These verses are one of the earliest literary attestations of the spoken Cappadocian vernacular.

==== Contemporary ====
The Cappadocian Greek-American immigrant and renowned Hollywood director Elia Kazan wrote a book "America, America" about his uncle, who grew up in Cappadocia in an environment of increasing persecution. Sent on foot by his father as a teenager, with the entire family savings, to Istanbul, Elia's uncle was supposed to establish a new life and, eventually, to bring the rest of the family to the city. In the end Elia's uncle traveled much further, to America, later fulfilling his filial duty and bringing his family over as well. Kazan made his book into an Academy Award-winning movie America, America in 1963.

=== Cuisine ===
The Cappadocian Greeks continued a number of Anatolian culinary traditions passed down since Byzantine times. These include the preparing of wind-cured meats known as pastirma, a delicacy called in Byzantine times "paston", along with the use of the ubiquitous Central Anatolian spinach-like herb madimak to make dishes such as a variant of spanakopita.

== Settlements ==
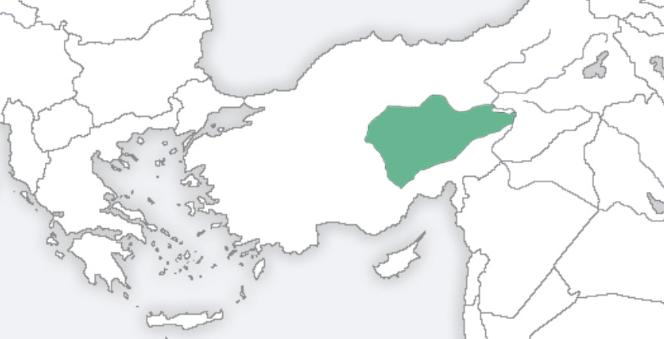
Original Cappadocian homeland

Settlements traditionally inhabited by Greek-speaking Cappadocian population in the past: (Note: Only the settlements where the Greek language was the main language of the Greek Christian population; in other places, Turkish was the primary language of the Greek Orthodox Cappadocian population.)

=== Nevşehir region ===
- Arapsun
- Sinasos
- Cemil
- Eneği
- Sylata
- Dila
- Malakopi
- Suvermez
- Potamia

=== Niğde region ===
- Trohos
- Akso
- Misti
- Çarıklı
- Semendire
- Uluağaç
- Delmason
- Aravani
- Fertek
- Kurdonos
- Bereketli Maden
- Karacaviran
- Kavuklu
- Ovacık
- Elmilik
- Buğamaden
- Limnae
- Andaval

=== Farasa-Develi region ===
- Farasa
- Afsar
- Kiska
- Hoşça
- Çukuryurt

=== Konya region ===
- Sille

== Notable Cappadocian Greeks ==
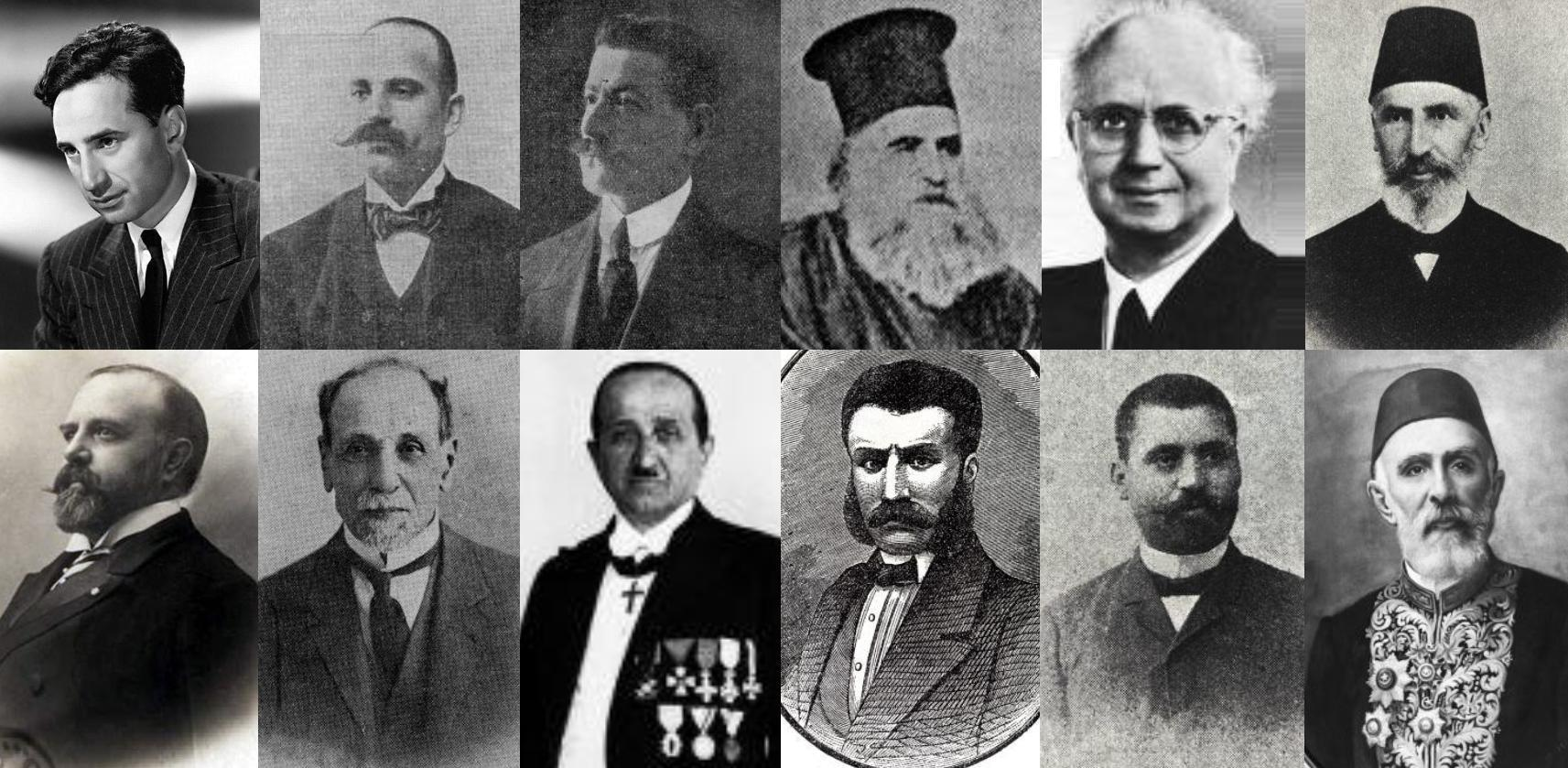
Twelve notable Cappadocian Greeks: (top row) Elia Kazan, Vasileios Stefanidis, Pantelis Georgiadis, Evgenios of Kayseri, Dimosthenis Daniilidis, Konstantinos Vagianis (bottom row) Ioannis Pesmazoglou, Pavlos Karolidis, Sofoklis Avraam Choudaverdoglou-Theodotos, Dimitrios Mavrofrydis, Ioakeim Valavanis, Georgios Georgiadis.

- Ariarathes V of Cappadocia (r. 163–130 BC) king of Cappadocia, predominantly Greek by descent.
- Archelaus (Pontic army officer) (2nd century BC) a Greek from Cappadocia who was a leading military general of the King Mithridates VI of Pontus.
- Neoptolemus (Pontic army officer) (died by 63 BC) was a distinguished general of King Mithridates VI of Pontus.
- Archelaus of Cappadocia (flourished 1st century BC & 1st century – died 17 AD) a descendant of Archelaus (Pontic army officer) who was the last king of Cappadocia
- Aretaeus of Cappadocia (81–138 AD) a native Cappadocian Greek, who was one of the leading surgeons of antiquity.
- Apollonius of Tyana (1st century AD) from Tyana, Cappadocia (modern day Bor in southern Turkey), a Neo-Pythagorean philosopher who became a mythical hero during the Roman Empire. He was born into a wealthy Cappadocian Greek family.
- Saint George (3rd–4th century AD) Soldier of the Roman army and Christian martyr
- Ulfilas (ca. 311 – 383) a Goth who originally came from a Cappadocian Greek family, translated the Holy Gospel into the Gothic vernacular.
- Saint Sarkis the Warrior (flourished 4th century, died 362–363) also known as Saint Sarkis the Greek is an Armenian Orthodox Saint who served as a Centurion in the Roman Empire.
- Cappadocian Fathers
  - Saint Basil (c. 329 – 379), of Cappadocia was Greek.
  - Gregory of Nazianzus (c. 330–c. 389 AD), Greek prelate and theologian Born of Greek parents in Cappadocia.
  - Gregory of Nyssa (c. 335 – c. 394), one of the most prominent Cappadocian Greek patristic figures
- Maurice Tiberius, Byzantine Emperor from Cappadocia. He was the first ethnically Greek Byzantine (Eastern Roman) Emperor (c. 582–602 AD)
- Sabbas the Sanctified (439–532 AD) a Cappadocian Greek monk, priest and saint.
- Modestus of Jerusalem (6th century) a Greek Orthodox Patriarch of Jerusalem from Sebasteia
- Heraclius, Byzantine Emperor from Cappadocia, possibly of mixed Greek-Armenian descent (610–641 AD).
- Constantine Maleinos (10th century) a Byzantine general, uncle of the emperor Nikephoros II Phokas.
- Nikephoros II Phokas (c. 912 - 969), Byzantine emperor who belonged to the Phokades, a Byzantine aristocratic clan from Cappadocia with distinguished generals.
- John I Tzimiskes (c. 925 - 976), Byzantine emperor, of mixed Greek-Armenian descent from Cappadocia, a member of the Kourkouas family, and son of the sister of Nikephoros II Phokas that was member of the Phokas family.
- Basil Giakoupes (13th century AD) Greek feudatory lord who held the court title of general (amir) in the Seljuk Sultanate of Rum.
- Sinan – (1489–1588) Grand Architect of the Ottoman court, born in Ağırnas in Cappadocia.
- Patriarch Paisius II of Constantinople Ecumenical Patriarch of Constantinople for four times in the 18th century.
- Hadji-Georgis the Athonite (1809–1886), a Cappadocian Greek Orthodox monk and ascetic
- Konstantinos Adosidis – (1818–1895) Ottoman-appointed Prince of Samos from 1873 to 1874, and again from 1879 to 1885.
- Theodoros Kasapis – Greek newspaper editor and educator (1835–1905)
- Patriarch Germanus V of Constantinople (1835–1920)
- Arsenios the Cappadocian – (1840–1922), a Greek Orthodox priest and saint from Çamlıca.
- Pavlos Karolidis – Greek historian (1849–1930)
- Avraam Vaporidis – (1855–1911) a distinguished Greek author, scholar and historian born in Fertek, Niğde province in Central Anatolia.
- Georgios Kourtoglou – (b. 1856, Nigde), a Greek political, legal and social activist who was deputy of Niğde in the late Ottoman Empire.
- Nikolaos Tsourouktsoglou – (1861–1922) a lawyer and journalist who was city councillor and a member of the Board of Governors of Smyrna in the late Ottoman Empire. His family was originally from Kayseri in Cappadocia.
- Sofoklis Avraam Choudaverdoglou-Theodotos – (1872–1956) an eminent Greek scholar, historian, stenographer and a member of the Ottoman Parliament. His family originate from the city of Tyana (modern Kemerhisar) Cappadocia.
- Ioannis Pesmazoglou – (1857–1906) a Greek banker, economist and politician whose family originate from Enderlik, Cappadocia.
- Leonidas Kestekides – (1876–1954) a chocolate manufacturer from Nigde, Cappadocia and founder of the internationally famous Leonidas company in Belgium.
- Prodromos Bodosakis-Athanasiadis - (1890–1979) was one of the most important figures in 20th century Greek industrial history, he was born in the region of Bor, Cappadocia.
- Petros Petridis – (1892–1977), a prominent Greek composer and conductor, born in Nigde (Cappodocia).
- Aristotle Onassis – (1906–1975) Greek business magnate, whose distant ancestry was from Talas, Kayseri
- Elia Kazan – (1909–2003) Greek-American film director whose family originated from Kayseri in Cappadocia.
- Saint Paisios of Mount Athos (1924–1994) born Arsenios Eznepidis, a well-known Athonite monk from Pharasa, Cappadocia.

== Video ==
The Cappadocian Greek-American immigrant and renowned Hollywood director Elia Kazan made an Academy Award-winning movie America, America about his uncle, who grew up in Cappadocia and then was sent on foot as a teenager, with the entire family savings, to escape persecution and establish a new life in Istanbul, and eventually, to bring the rest of the family there.
