= Vaporidis =

Vaporidis is a surname. Notable people with the surname include:

- Avraam Vaporidis (1855–1911), Greek author
- Nicolas Vaporidis (born 1981), Italian actor
