= Sophocles (disambiguation) =

Sophocles was an ancient Greek playwright.

Sophocles may also refer to:

- Sophocles (given name), a list of people named Sophocles or Sofoklis
- Evangelinos Apostolides Sophocles (1807–1883), professor of classics and Modern Greek, and lexicographer
- SS Ionic (1883), a cargo liner renamed Sophocles in 1900
- SS Sophocles (1921), an ocean liner
- Sophocles (crater), on the planet Mercury
- Sophocles (software), film and television screenwriting software
- Sophocles, a character from the Pokémon franchise
