= Nikolaos Tsourouktsoglou =

Greek lawyer, journalist and political and social activist

- Born: 1861; Smyrna, Ottoman Empire
- Died: September 21, 1922 (aged 60); Smyrna, Ottoman Empire

Nikolaos Tsourouktsoglou (Greek: Νικόλαος Τσουρούκτσογλου; Turkish: Nikolaki Çürükçüoğlu Efendi; Smyrna, 1861–1922) was a distinguished Greek lawyer and journalist who was a political and social activist. He was a city councillor and a member of the board of governors of Smyrna. He was also founder and editor of the French and Greek newspapers La Réforme and Imerisia in the late Ottoman Empire.

== Biography ==
Nikolaos Tsourouktsoglou was born in Smyrna (modern İzmir, Turkey) in 1861 to a Cappadocian Greek family originally from Kayseri in Cappadocia. As a child he attended and eventually graduated from the Evangelical School of Smyrna. After graduation, he studied at the Ludwig-Maximilians-Universität München and graduated with a law degree. After graduation, Nikolaos moved back to Smyrna where he eventually founded a French language newspaper called La Réforme in 1900. In 1901, he co-founded a Greek language newspaper called Imerisia (Ημερησία). Through his media outlets and Law background Nikolaos fought for the defence of his compatriots rights in the late Ottoman Empire. He was a member of the board of governors and council of elders of Smyrna in the Vilayet of Aydin.

During the Greco-Turkish War in August 1922, the Greek military was defeated, and the Turkish army entered the city of Smyrna. Tsourouktsoglou was arrested, along with other prominent Greek members of the city including the Metropolitan of Smyrna Chrysostomos Kalafatis and also Georgakis Klimanoglou. The Turkish military officer Nureddin Pasha ordered the execution of Tsourouktsoglou who was beheaded. Nikolaos Tsourouktsoglou's decapitated corpse was eventually discovered in Smyrna along with the corpses of other high-profile Greeks of the city.
