= Sophocles (given name) =

Sophocles is a Greek masculine given name.

Sophocles or Sofoklis may refer to:

== Sophocles ==
- Sophocles (c. 497/6–406/5 BC), ancient Greek playwright
- Sophocles (fl. 431-404 BC), Athenian general (see Thucydides 3.115.5, 4.2.2, 4.46.1, 4.65.3)
- Sophocles Papas (1893 or 1894–1986), Greek classical guitar pedagogue and music publisher
- Sophocles Sophocleous (born 1962), Cypriot politician
- Sophocles Sophocleous (academic), Cypriot academic

== Sofoklis ==
- Sofoklis Avraam Choudaverdoglou-Theodotos (1872–1956), Greek scholar, historian, stenographer and member of the Ottoman Parliament
- Sofoklis Dousmanis (1868–1952), Greek admiral, twice chief of the Greek Navy General Staff, and Minister for Naval Affairs
- Sofokli Lazri (1923–2002), Albanian diplomat, journalist and suspected KGB agent
- Sofoklis Schortsanitis (born 1985), Greek former basketball player
- Sofoklis Venizelos (1894–1964), Greek politician, three times Prime Minister of Greece
