= Ioannis Pesmazoglou =

Greek banker, economist, and politician

Ioannis Pesmazoglou Ιωάννης Πεσμαζόγλου
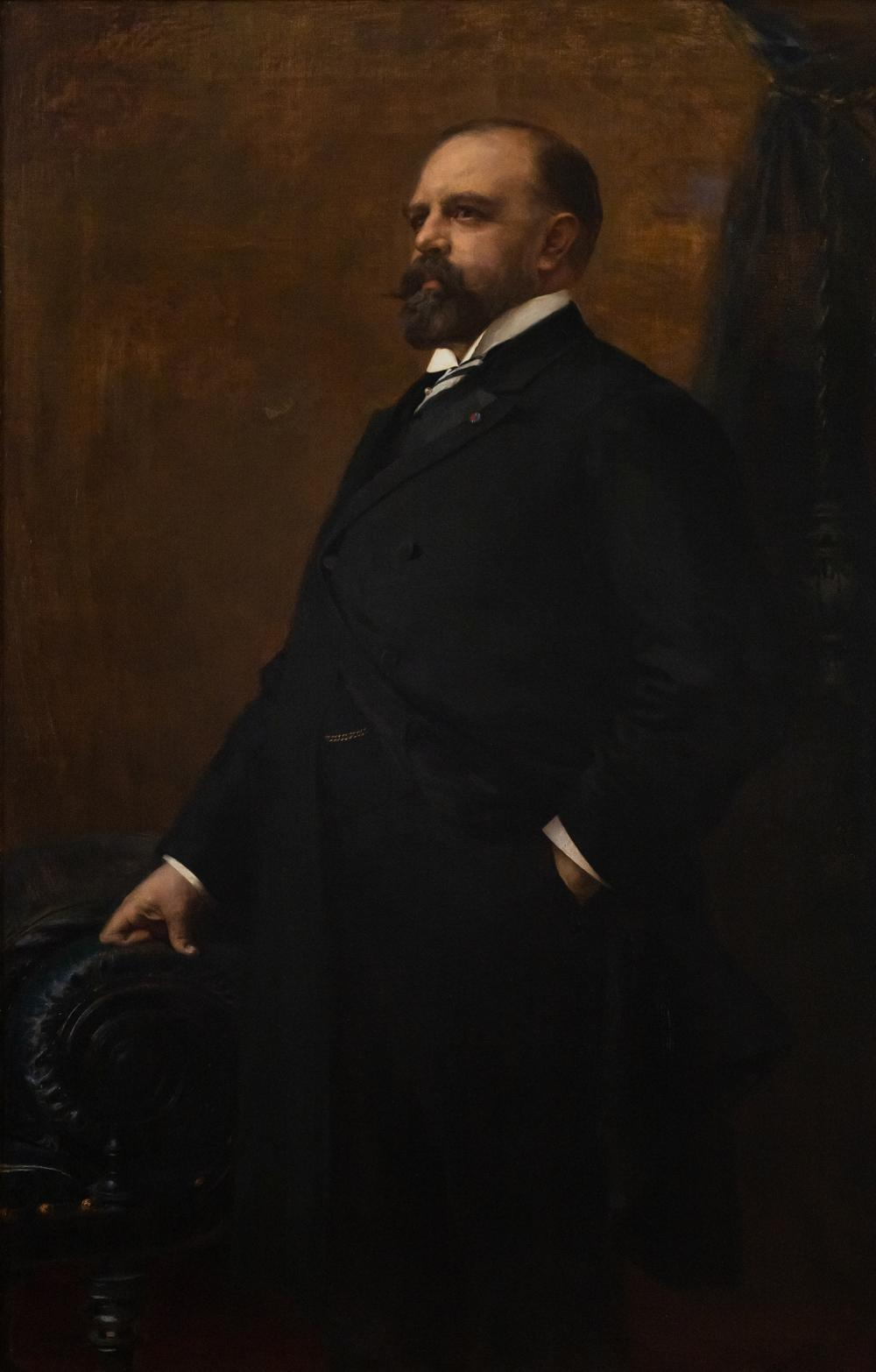
- Born: 1857
- Died: 1906 (aged 48–49)
- Occupations: Banker and politician

Ioannis Pesmazoglou (Greek: Ιωάννης Πεσμαζόγλου; 1857–1906) was an ethnic Greek banker, economist and politician who lived in the Ottoman Empire and Egypt before emigrating to Greece in about 1882.

Ioannis Pesmazoglou was from Constantinople (now Istanbul), although his family originate from Enderlik, in Cappadocia. Pesmazoglou studied economic sciences in Paris and in the beginning, he was employed at the Crédit Lyonnais bank in Alexandria, Egypt. In 1882, he became head of the Anglo-Egyptian Bank, before moving to Athens, where he founded his own bank. In 1897, Pesmazoglou's bank was merged with the Bank of Athens, of which he now became chairman. Pesmazoglou remained a member of the board of the Bank of Athens until his death.

Pesmazoglou also founded the Privileged Company for the Protection of Currants (Eniaia or Eniea) as well as the Wine and Alcohol Company as measures to combat the acute financial crisis resulting from the plummeting prices of Corinthian raisins, one of the country's chief exports. He also funded the establishment of night schools for the Athens Trade Employees Union. From 1900 he became involved in politics, being elected a member of the Greek Parliament in 1905 and 1906, representing Athens, Elis and Messenia.

His sons were Andreas, Stefanos and Georgios. His son Andreas entered the Greek Navy and died in 1927 at age 27 and Stefanos became a journalist, founding the newspaper Proia.

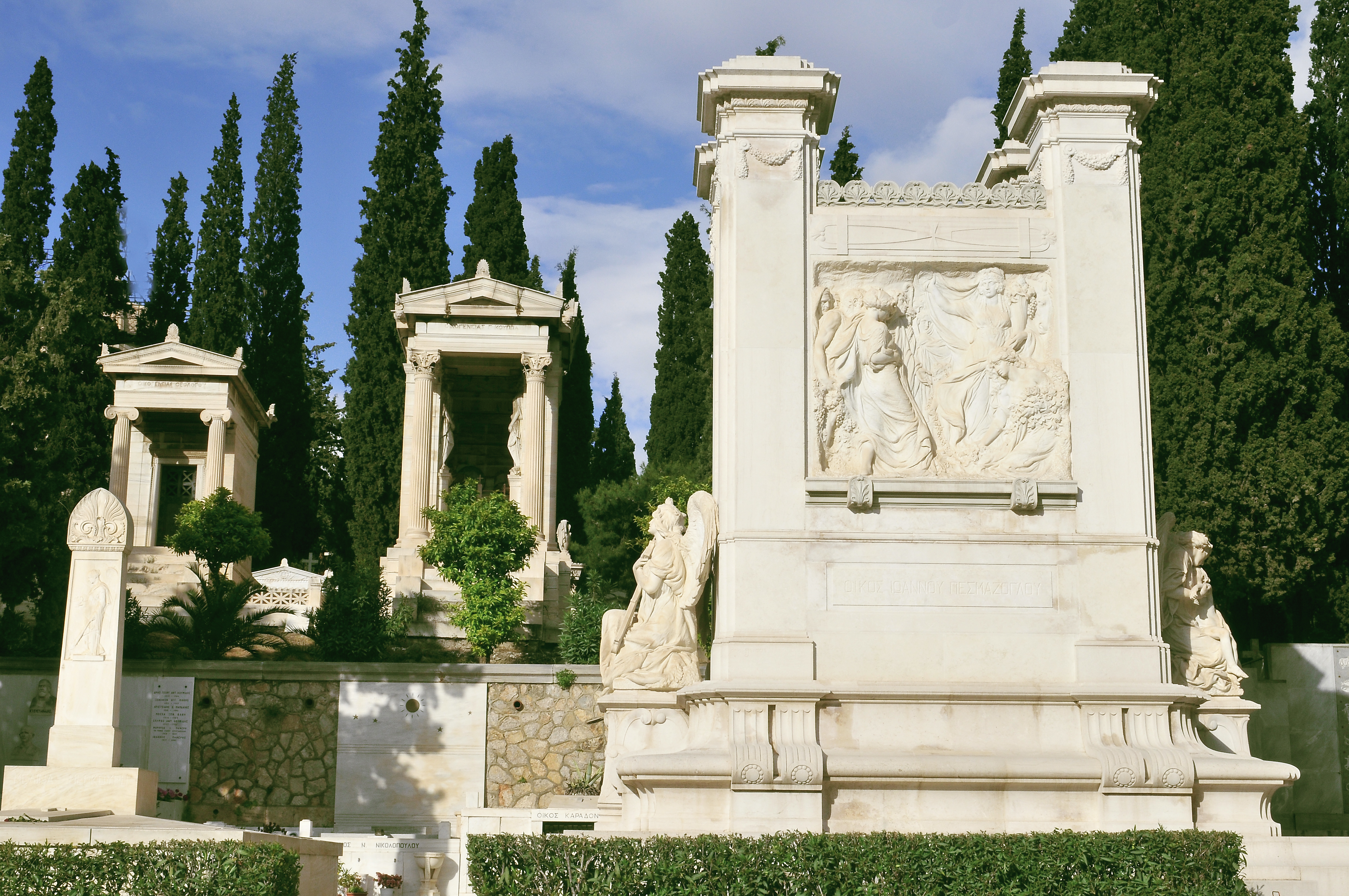
Tomb of Ioannis Pesmazoglou family (right), First Cemetery of Athens

The tomb of Ioannis Pesmazoglou and family is in the First Cemetery of Athens, Greece.
