= Sofoklis Avraam Choudaverdoglou-Theodotos =

Greek scholar, historian, stenographer, and politician

Sofoklis Choudaverdoglou-Theodotos
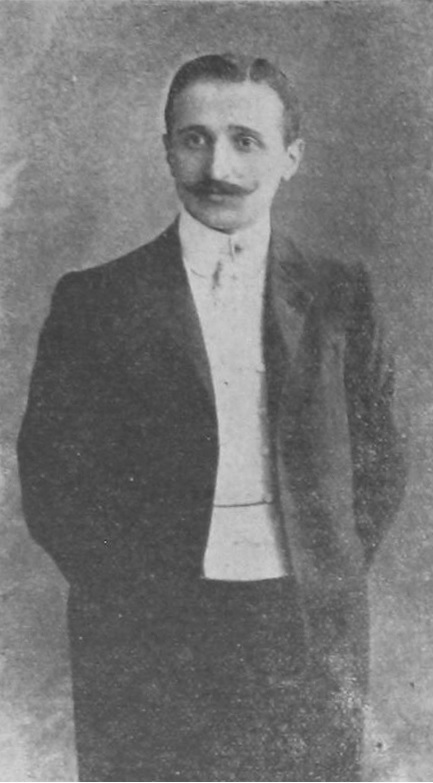
- Sofoklis Choudaverdoglou-Theodotos
- Born: October 24, 1872; Constantinople, Ottoman Empire
- Died: September 21, 1956 (aged 83); Athens, Kingdom of Greece

Sofoklis Avraam Choudaverdoglou-Theodotos (Greek: Σοφοκλής Αβραάμ Χουδαβερδόγλους Θεόδοτος; Turkish: Sofakles Hüdaverdioğlu) also known simply as Sofoklis Choudaverdoglou (1872, Constantinople – 1956, Athens), was an eminent Greek scholar, historian, stenographer and a member of the Ottoman Parliament.

== Biography ==
Sofoklis Avraam Choudaverdoglou-Theodotos was born on 24 October 1872 to a Cappadocian Greek family in Chalcedon (Kadıköy), Constantinople. His father, Avraaam-Plato Choudaverdoglou-Theodotos and mother Katerina Choudaverdoglou were natives of Tyana (modern Kemerhisar) in Cappadocia. The Choudaverdoglou family traced their descent to an aristocratic Byzantine family. The original Greek family surname was "Theodotos" (Θεόδοτος) and was translated to Ottoman Turkish in the early Ottoman period. As a child he studied at the Urban Chalcedon School and was then admitted to Phanar Greek Orthodox College and graduated in 1890 with honours. He was fluent in various languages including Greek, Turkish, English, French and German.

Sofoklis went abroad where he studied stenography. In 1893, on his return to Constantinople he was served as secretary general manager of the Ottoman Railway Company. During his employment at the Ottoman Railway Company, he frequently made trips to Cappadocia, where he began his personal interest in the history, folklore, ethnology and archaeology of the area. In January 1900 he was appointed major of a large tobacco company based in Istanbul, a position he held until 1920. During this period Sofoklis married Katerina Tzivanopoulou, with whom he had a son. Sofoklis actively participated in various educational, charitable and community Greek organisations in Istanbul and Tyana. He was also an active member of a secret Greek organisation, and from 1918 he worked at the Greek Military Mission in Constantinople.

Following the Greco-Turkish War of 1919–1922 and subsequent Asia Minor Catastrophe Sofoklis fled to Greece. He continued to be active in educational fields where he continued his activities and various international shorthand conferences. He was a member of several scientific societies and associations in Athens and was appointed director of Byzantine Studies. from 1928 until World War II he worked as a secretary and interpreter in the Hungarian embassy in Athens. Sofoklis published several books and articles in scientific magazines and newspapers. Moreover, he undertook the writing of various associations and institution Regulations. Sofoklis died on 11 January 1956 in Athens, Greece.
