= 1906 Greek parliamentary election =

- 26 March 1906

All 177 seats in the Hellenic Parliament 89 seats needed for a majority
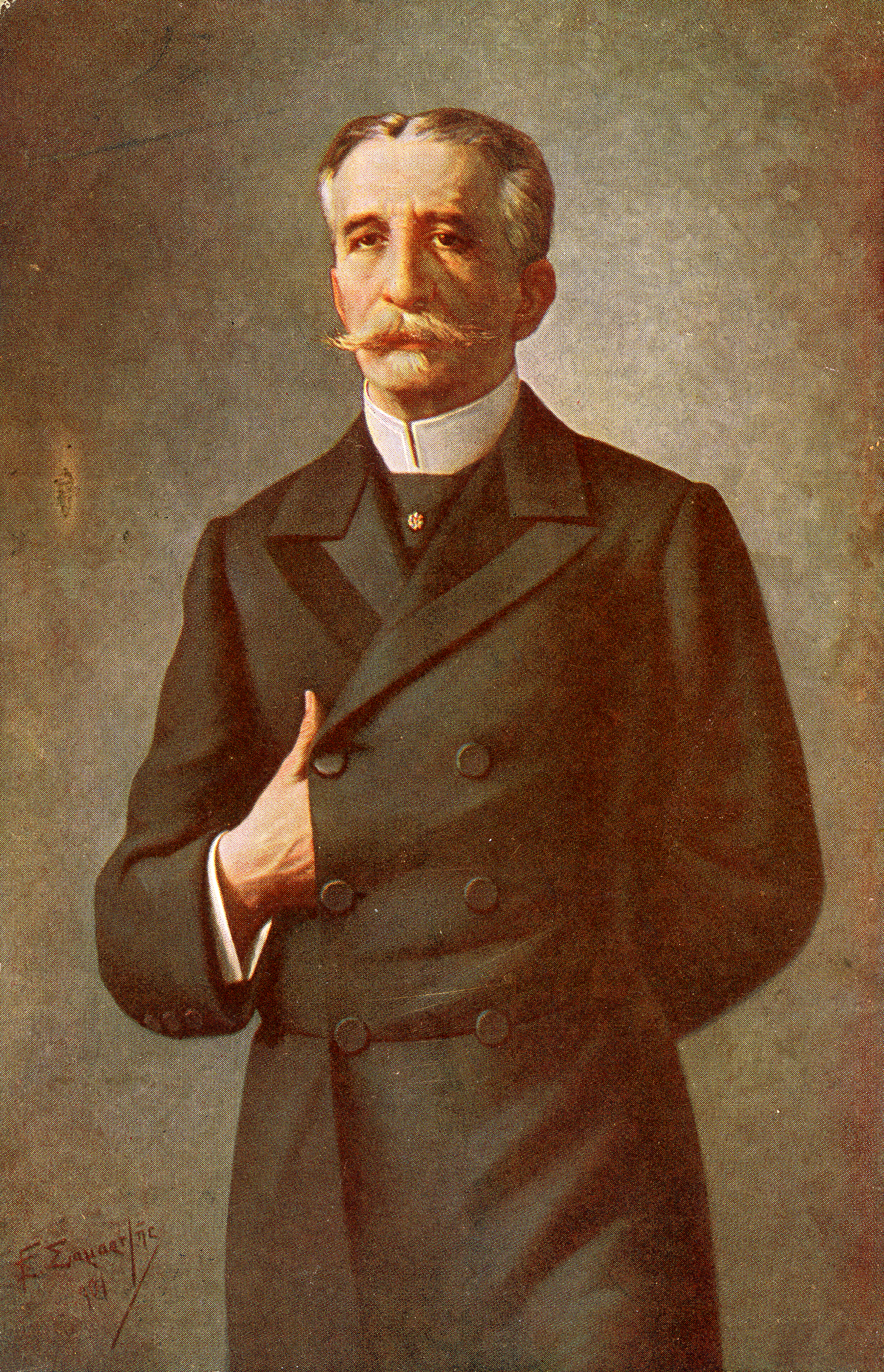

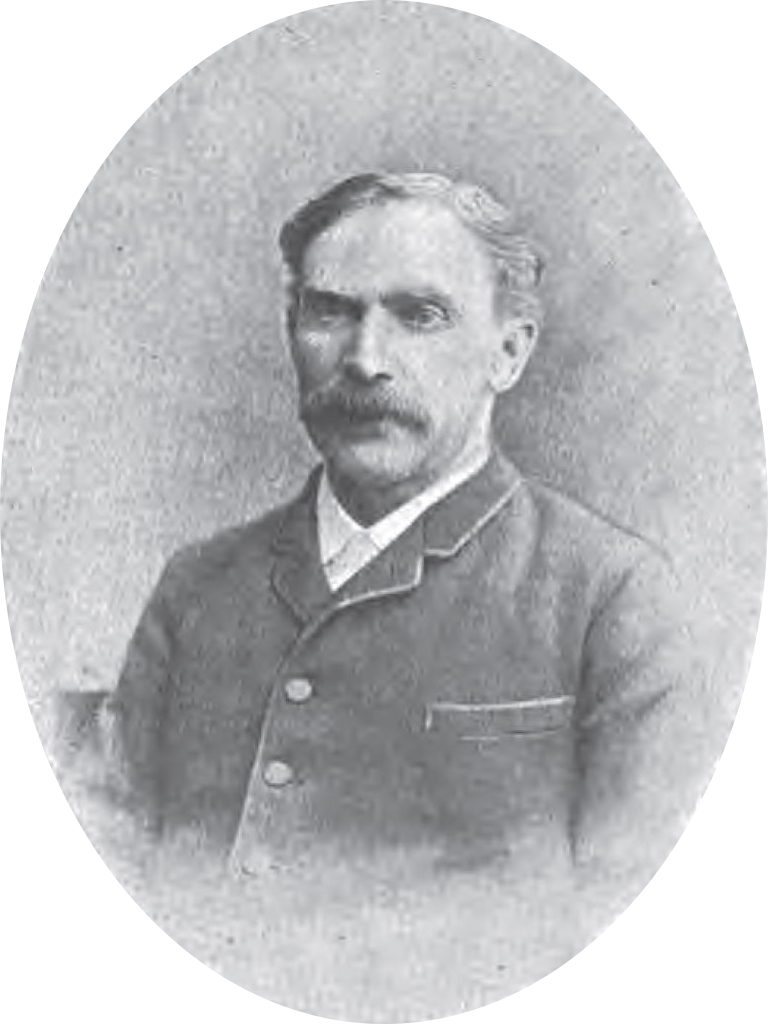

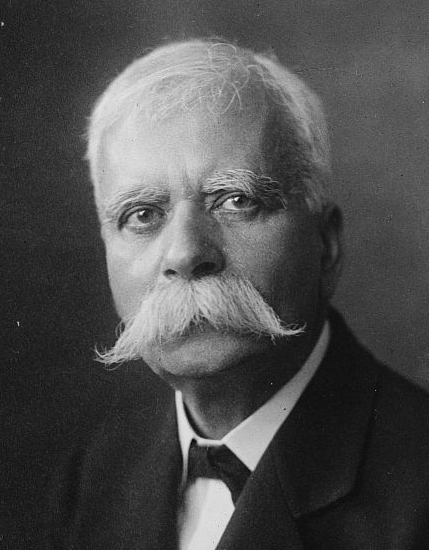

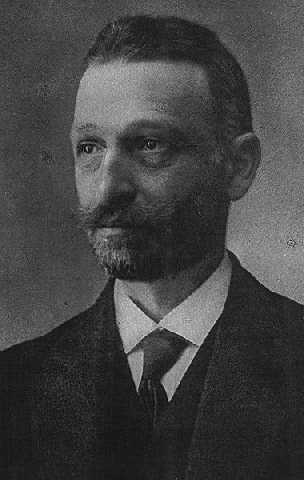
Leader	Georgios Theotokis	Dimitrios Rallis
Seats won	112–114	47
Leader	Alexandros Zaimis	Dimitrios Gounaris
Seats won	7	4–6
Prime Minister before election
Georgios Theotokis
New Party
Prime Minister after election
Georgios Theotokis
New Party

Parliamentary elections were held in Greece on 26 March 1906. Supporters of Georgios Theotokis emerged as the largest bloc in Parliament, with between 112 and 114 of the 177 seats. Theotokis remained Prime Minister after the election, having originally assumed office on 21 December 1905.

== Results ==
Party	Seats
Supporters of Georgios Theotokis	112–114
Supporters of Dimitrios Rallis	47
Supporters of Alexandros Zaimis	7
Supporters of Dragoumis and Gounaris	4–6
Independents	6
Total	177
Source: Nohlen & Stöver
