= Avraam Vaporidis =

Greek author, scholar and historian

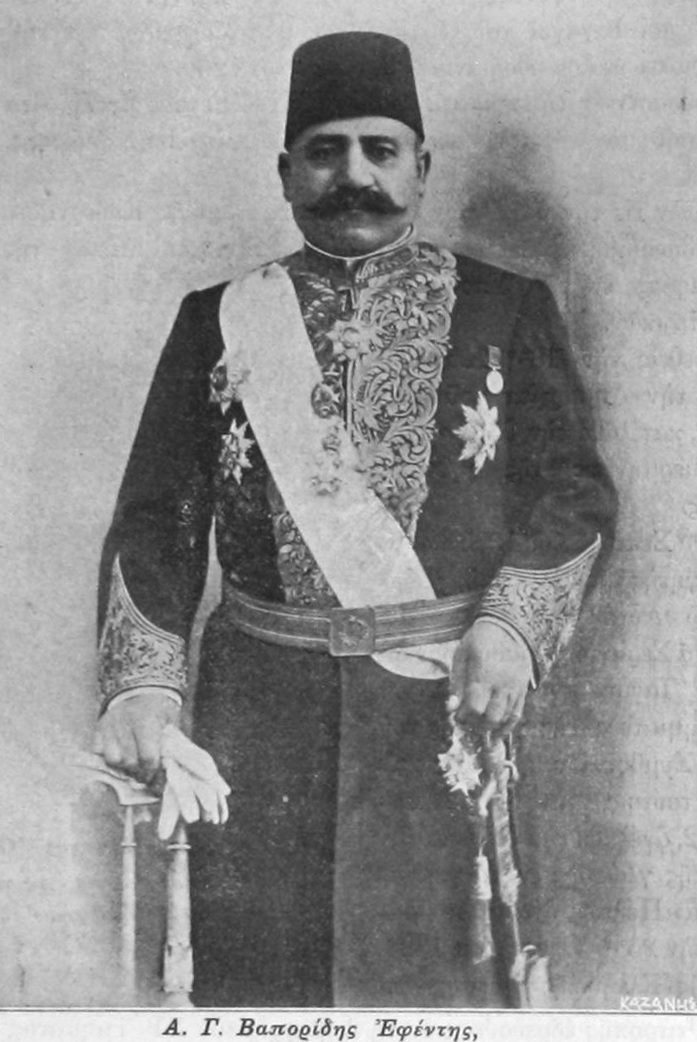
- Avraam Vaporidis
- Born: 1855; Fertek, Konya Vilayet, Ottoman Empire
- Died: 1911 (aged 55–56); Constantinople, Ottoman Empire

Avraam Vaporidis (Greek: Αβραάμ Βαπορίδης (Εφέντη); Turkish: Avraam Vaporidi Efendi) also known as Avraam Efendi (1855, Fertek – 1911, Constantinople), was a distinguished ethnic Greek author, scholar and historian living in the Ottoman Empire. He was a high-ranking dignitary of the late Ottoman Empire who also served as a senior Government official and was an inspector (Matbaalar Müfettişi) of the Court of the Imperial Ministry of Education.

== Biography ==
Avraam Vaporidis was born in 1855 to a Cappadocian Greek family in the city of Fertek, Niğde province in Central Anatolia. Vaporidis worked at the ministry of education and published biographies of the Ottoman Sultans and the history of the Ottoman Empire for publications in Greek schools in the late nineteenth century.
