= Historical and Ethnographical Museum of the Cappadocian Greeks =

Museum in Nea Karvali, Greece

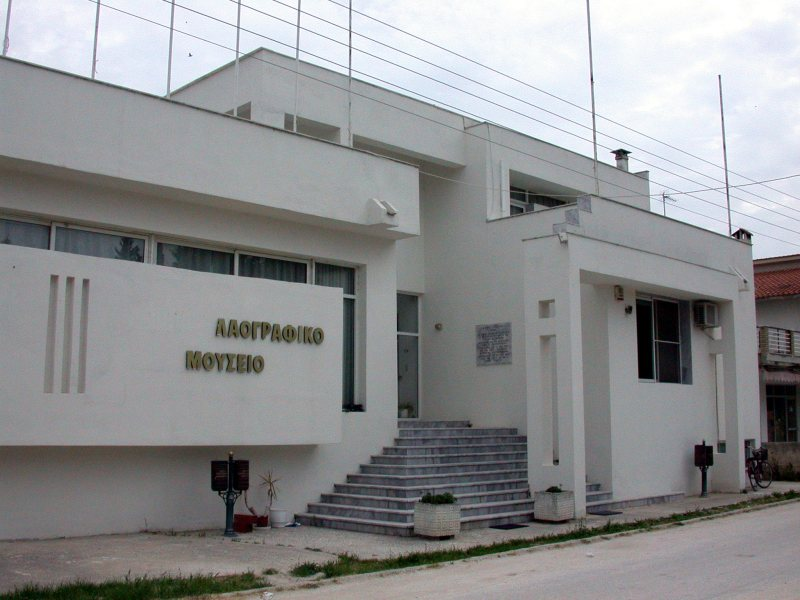
- Street view
- Coordinates: 40°57′48″N 24°30′43″E
- Website: www.stegi-karvalis.gr

Historical and Ethnographical Museum of the Cappadocian Greeks is located in the village of Nea Karvali just north of the Kavala–Xanthi national road (EO2), about 8 km from Kavala in Eastern Macedonia, Greece. In this village the local youth founded in 1981 the Nea Karvali House of Culture in order to improve the cultural heritage. At the same time they began to collect relics of the past and objects of everyday life, such as documents, books, photographs, costumes, pictures, icons and folk culture.

== Location ==
The museum is housed in a building which opened in 1995, behind the Church of Agios Grigorios. It was founded by the Nea Karvali Cultural Centre with the aim of preserving and disseminating Cappadocian Greek culture. In 1997, the European Union declared it ‘Museum of the Year’.

== Displays ==
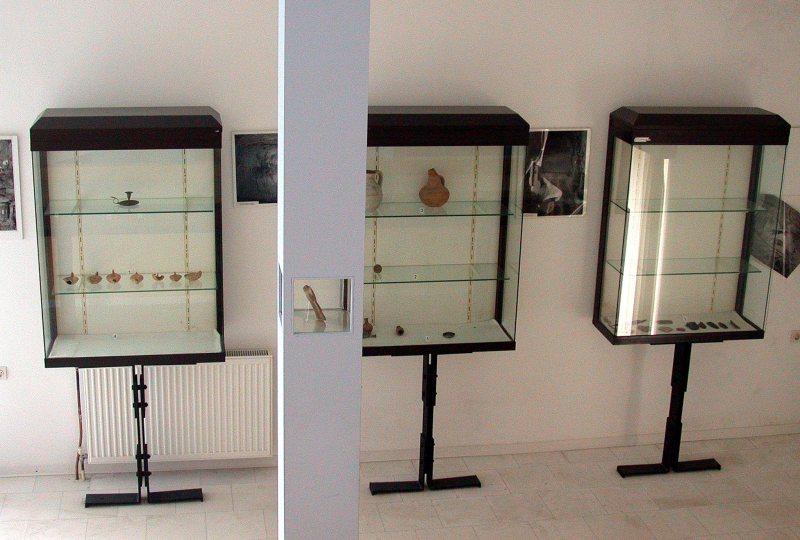
Showcases displaying artefacts of the Hittite civilization

It displays men’s and women’s traditional Cappadocian dress; tsouhades (rugs decorated with lions and plane leaves) for holidays and weddings; the Cappadocian lyre known as the kemeni; tools and objects used in men’s occupations (farming, commerce, quilt-making, pottery); the skilfully made and decorated Cappadocian receptacles known as lik-lik that were used as water and wine pitchers.

The treasures from the Cappadocian churches which the refugees brought with them in 1924 are very important, as are the old newspapers, periodicals, and schoolbooks written in karamanlidika, Turkish in Greek script. All this reflects the lifestyle of the Greek population which lived in the depths of Asia Minor, particularly in Karvali in Cappadocia. There are also some showcases displaying artefacts of the culture of the Hettae, an ancient culture which developed in Cappadocia. Last but not least, in the museum can be found a rare collection of books (14th, 15th, 18th, 19th centuries).

== Programs ==
The museum runs educational programmes for schoolchildren, mainly on the theme of rugs and rug-making.
