= Transanatolia Rally Raid =

Turkish rally raid

Transanatolia Rally Raid is an annual rally raid held in Turkey. First run in 2010, the event starts in Antalya and crosses the Taurus Mountains, Cappadocia and the Aladağlar, covering more than 2,000 km. Entrants compete in rally, raid and adventure classes, on motorcycles, cars and buggies.

In the third edition, on 7 September 2012, Turkish rider Kemal Merkit and Dutch rider Wouter Vaarkamp were killed in a collision on the Meke Gölü stage; the rally continued after a tribute convoy.
