= Kızılkaya (mountain) =

Mountain peak in Turkey

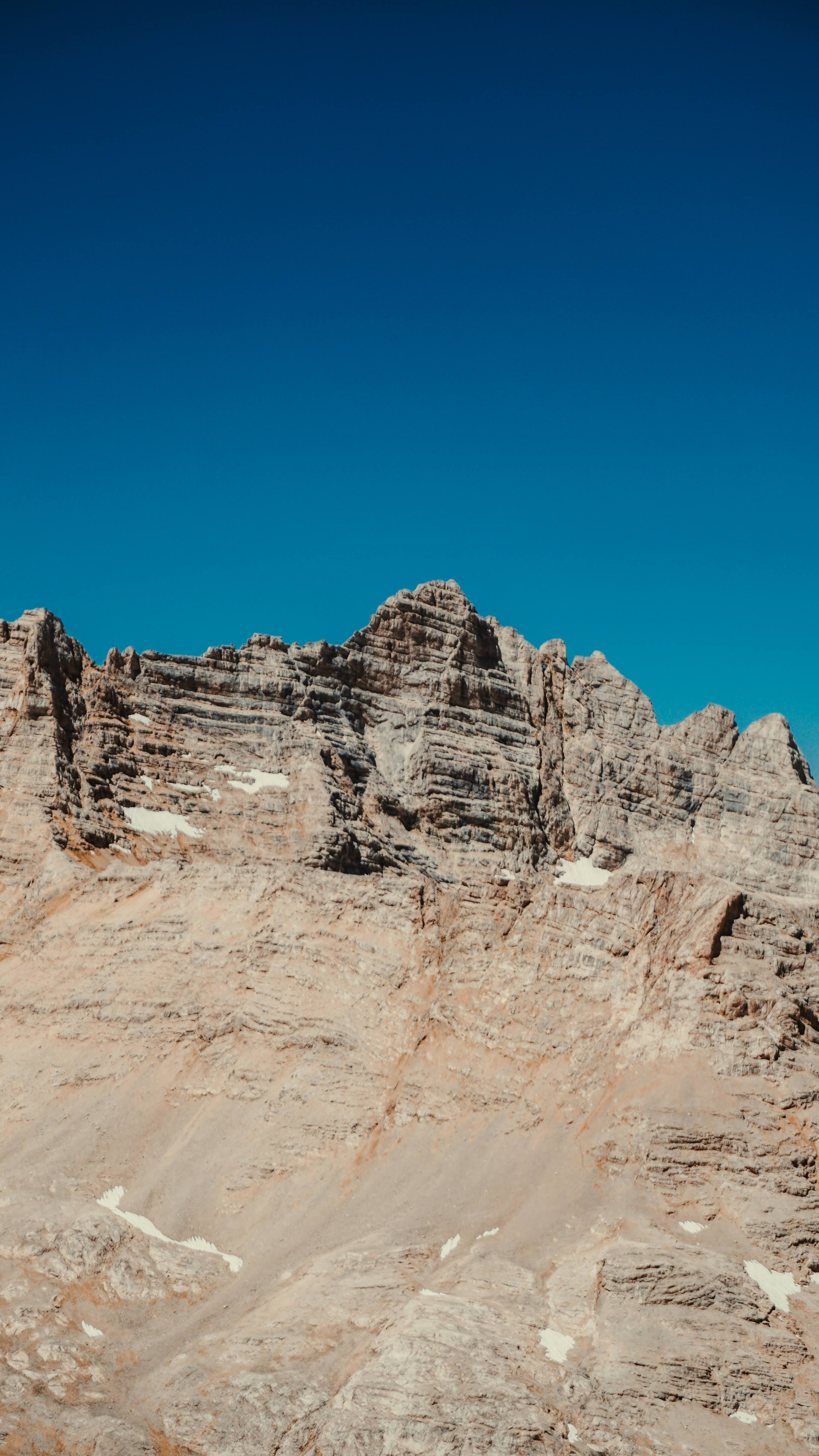

Highest point
- Elevation: 3,767 m (12,359 ft)
- Prominence: 2,347 m (7,700 ft)
- Coordinates: 37°47′48″N 35°9′25″E

Geography
- Location within Turkey
- Location: Niğde and Kayseri Province, Turkey
- Parent range: Anti-Taurus Mountains

Kızılkaya, also called Kızılkaya Peak (Turkish: Demirkazık Dağı), is a summit located in Aladağlar National Park between the provinces of Niğde and Kayseri, Turkey.

At a height of 3,767 m (12,359 ft), it is the highest peak of the Anti-Taurus Mountains. Until recently, the highest peak there was Demirkazık Peak, but in 2008, the height of Kızılkaya was registered as 3771.418 meters in GPS measurements made with the initiative of the General Directorate of Mapping and the Turkish Mountaineering Federation.
