= Bademdere =

Settlement in Turkey

- Village
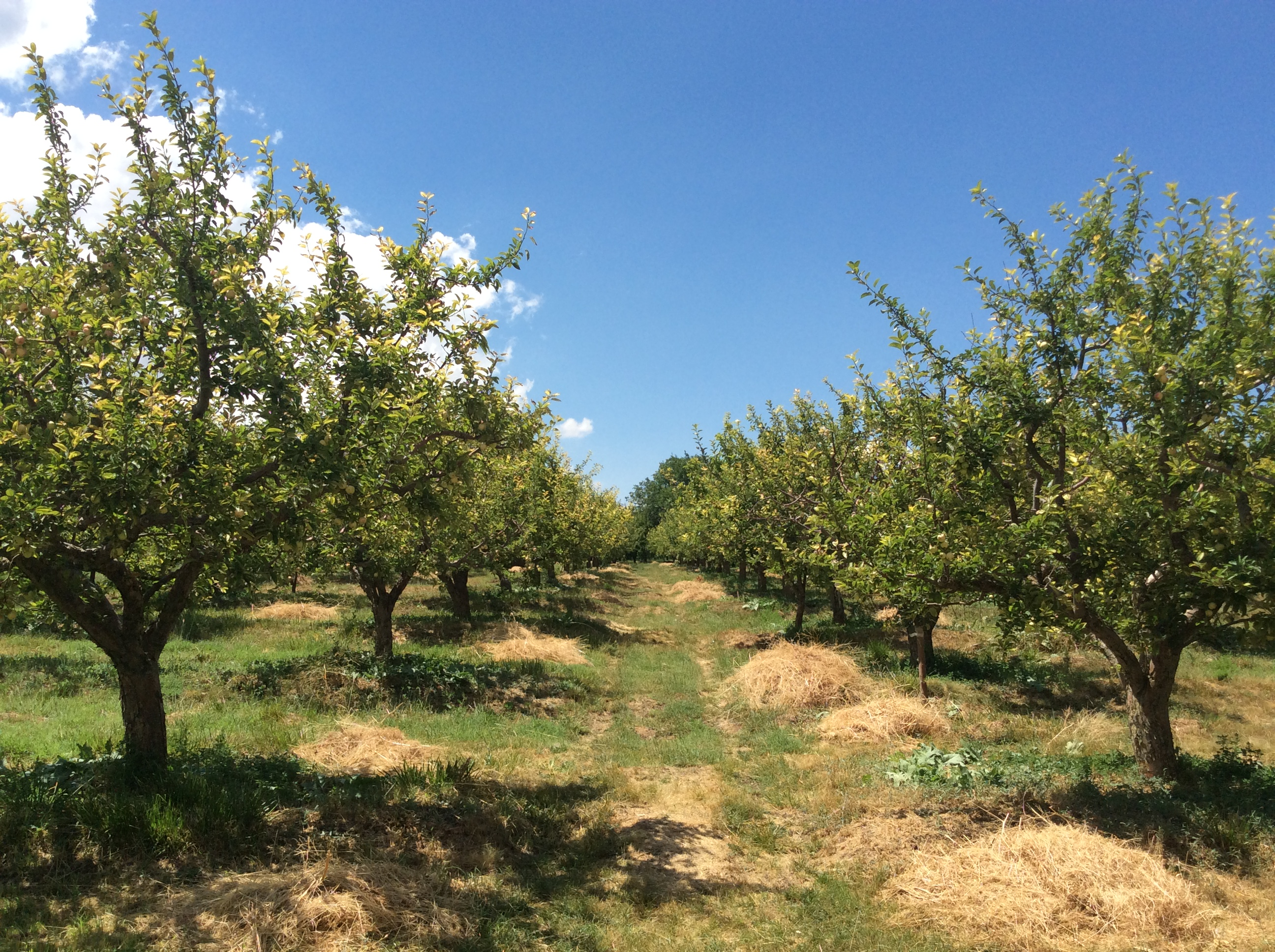
- Apple orchard in Bademdere

- Location within Turkey Location within Turkey Central Anatolia
- Coordinates: 37°55′12″N 35°04′00″E
- Country: Turkey
- Province: Niğde
- District: Çamardı
- Elevation: 1,640 m (5,380 ft)
- Population (2022): 1,042
- Time zone: UTC+3 (TRT)
- Postal code: 51670
- Area code: 0388

Bademdere is a village in Çamardı District, Niğde Province, Turkey. Its population is 1,042 (2022). Before the 2013 reorganisation, it was a town (belde).

== Geography ==
The distance to Çamardı is 16 km (9.9 mi) and to Niğde is 54 km (34 mi). The town is on the northern slopes of Taurus Mountains with an average altitude of 1,640 m (5,380 ft).

== History ==
The settlement was established in the 18th century by miners from Gümüşhane Province in the Black Sea region who worked in mines in the Taurus Mountains. In 1972 the settlement was declared a township.
