= Aladağlar National Park =

National park in Turkey

- Aladağlar Milli Parkı
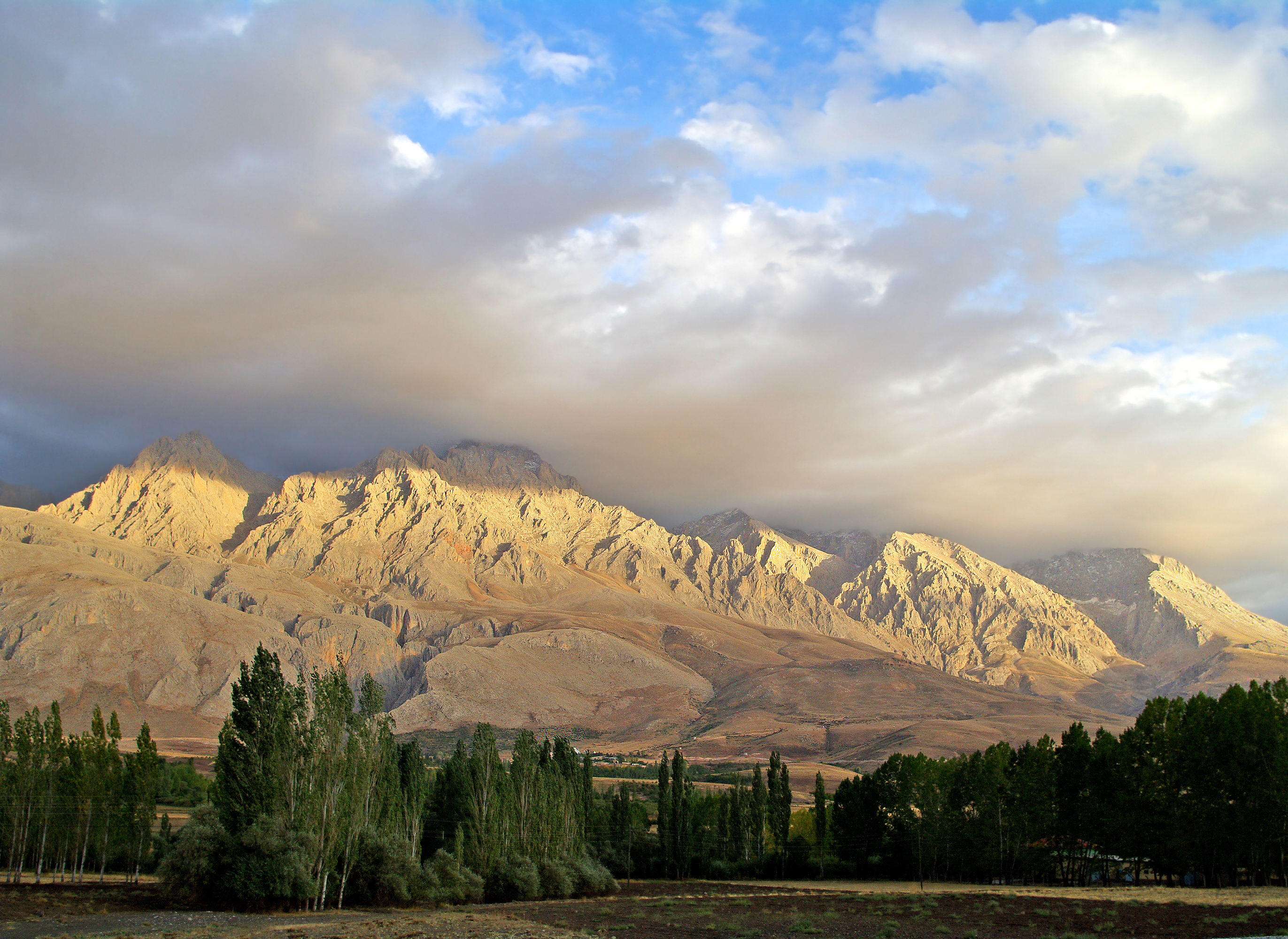
- A view of the Aladağlar.

- Location within Turkey
- Location: Yahyalı, Kayseri Province-Çamardı, Niğde Province-Aladağ, Adana Province, Turkey
- Coordinates: 37°49′22.63″N 35°10′15.15″E
- Area: 55,065 ha (136,070 acres)
- Established: April 21, 1995
- Governing body: Ministry of Forest and Water Management
- Website: www.milliparklar.gov.tr/mp/aladaglar/index.htm

The Aladağlar National Park (Turkish: Aladağlar Milli Parkı), established on April 21, 1995, is in southern Turkey. Its name, meaning Crimson Mountains, is said to have been given to it because of the rusty colour the mountains acquire towards sunset. A part of the Anti-Taurus Mountains, the national parks covers 55,065 ha (136,070 acres) at an average elevation of 3,500 m (11,500 ft) above sea level spreading over parts of the districts of Yahyalı in Kayseri province, Çamardı in Niğde province and Aladağ in Adana province.

The Aladağlar contains four climbable peaks that are higher than 3700m. The highest peak is Kızılkaya with a height of 3767m.

Many lakes and waterfalls form here once the snow melts in early spring.

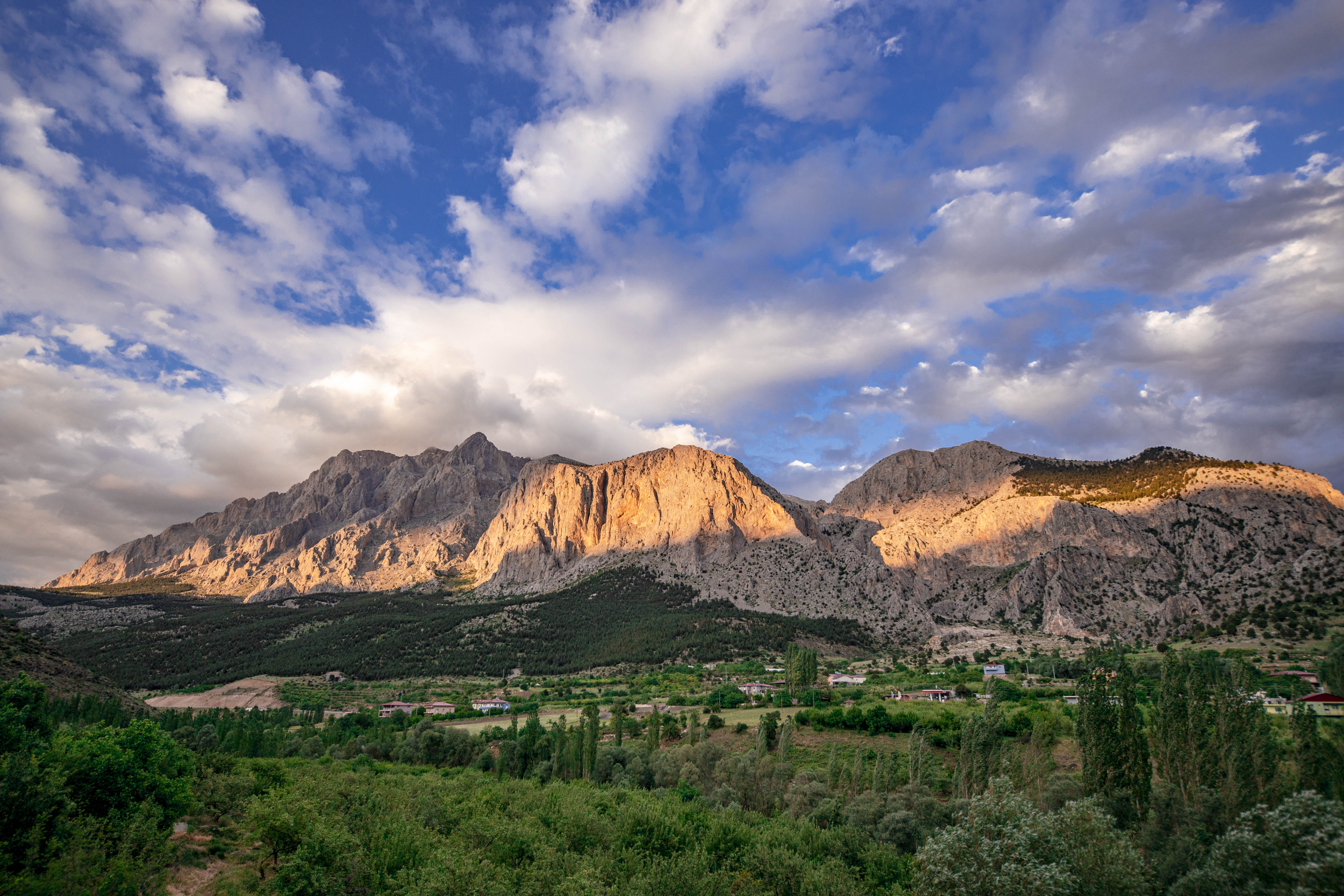
Yelatan village Aladağlar
