= Eynelli =

- Village
- Location within Turkey Location within Turkey Central Anatolia
- Coordinates: 37°56′N 35°01′E
- Country: Turkey
- Province: Niğde
- District: Çamardı
- Elevation: 1,678 m (5,505 ft)
- Population (2022): 694
- Time zone: UTC+3 (TRT)

Eynelli is a village in Çamardı District of Niğde Province, Turkey. Its population is 694 (2022). It is situated in northern slopes of the Toros Mountains. The village is at the north of Çamardı.
