= Demirkazık Peak =

Mountain peak in Turkey

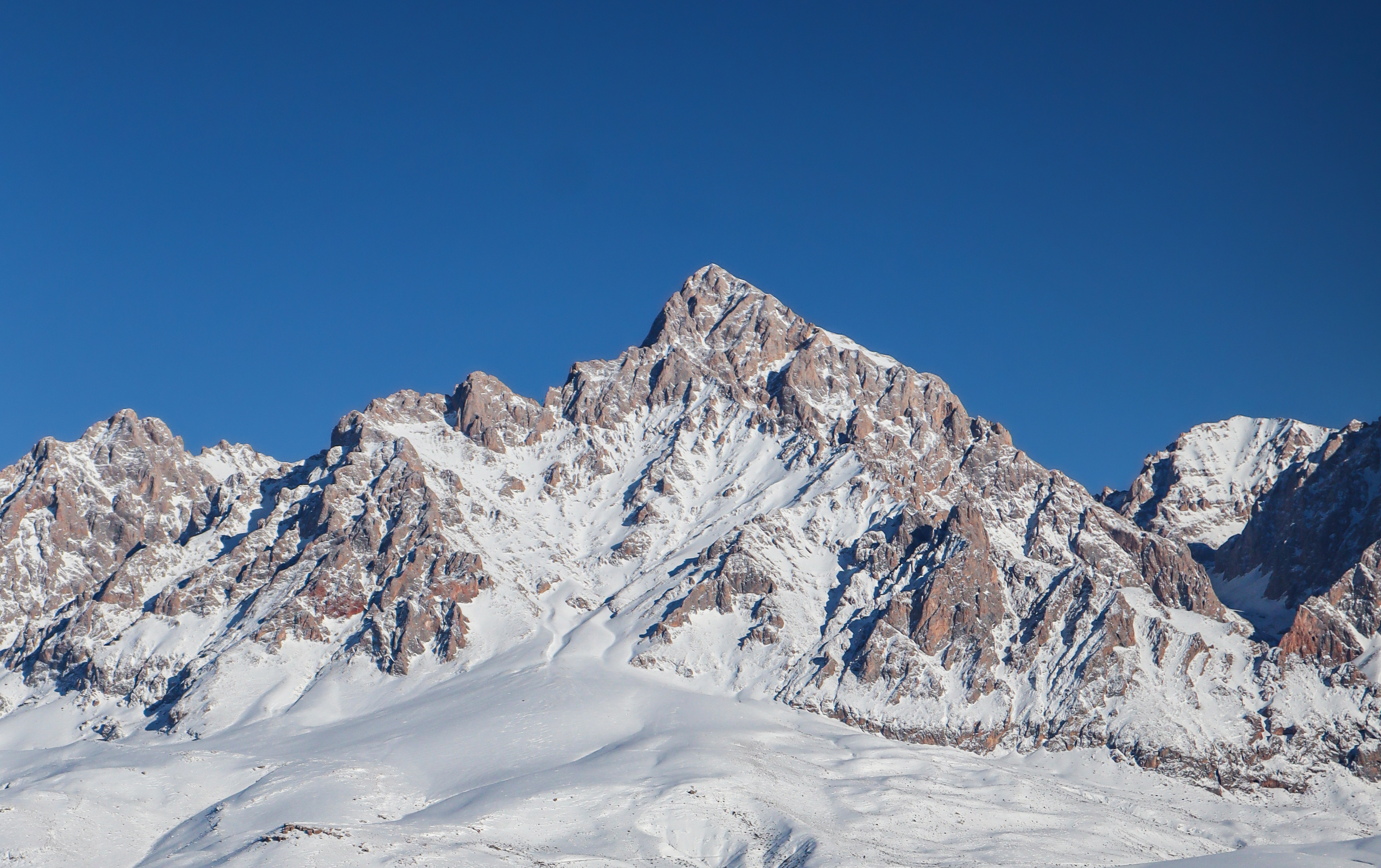
- Demirkazık Peak

Highest point
- Elevation: 3,756 m (12,323 ft)
- Coordinates: 37°47′47″N 35°09′20″E

Geography
- Location within Turkey
- Location: Çamardı, Niğde Province, Turkey
- Parent range: Toros Mountains

Demirkazık Peak (Turkish: Demirkazık Dağı) is a summit in Aladağlar a portion of Toros Mountains, Turkey. ("Demirkazık", literally "iron post" is the name of several summits in Turkey) Administratively, it is a part of Çamardı ilçe (district) of Niğde Province at 37°47′47″N 35°09′20″E. Turkish Geography Atlas gives its altitude as 3,756 metres (12,323 ft). Being a conical mountain, it is a famous peak among mountaineers. However, it may not be the highest point of the mountain range.

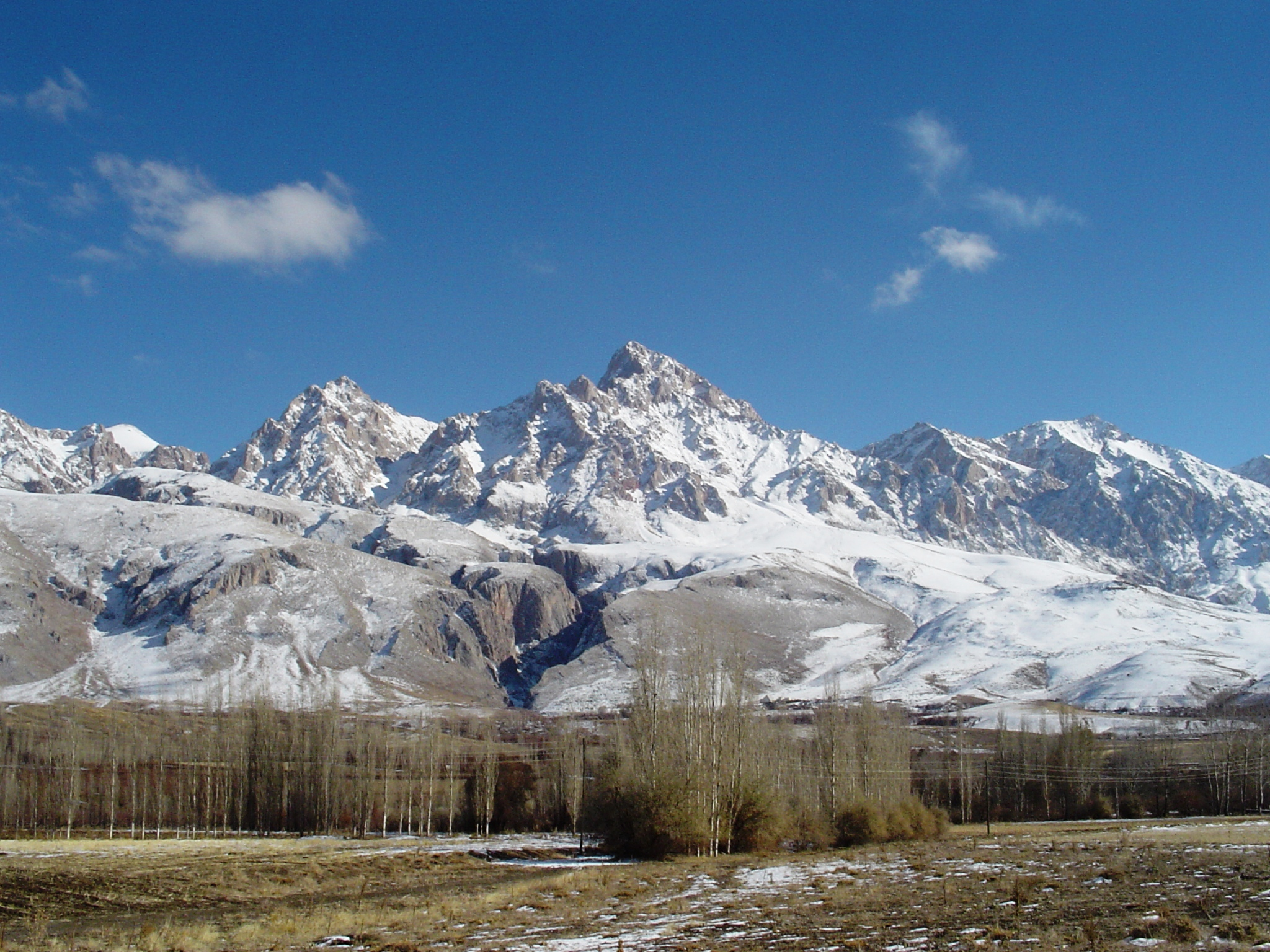
West side view of the Peak Demirkazik

The first successful ascent was by Georg Künne, Wilhelm Martin, his wife Marianne, Veli Çavuş and their guide Yunus in July 1927.

== Gallery ==
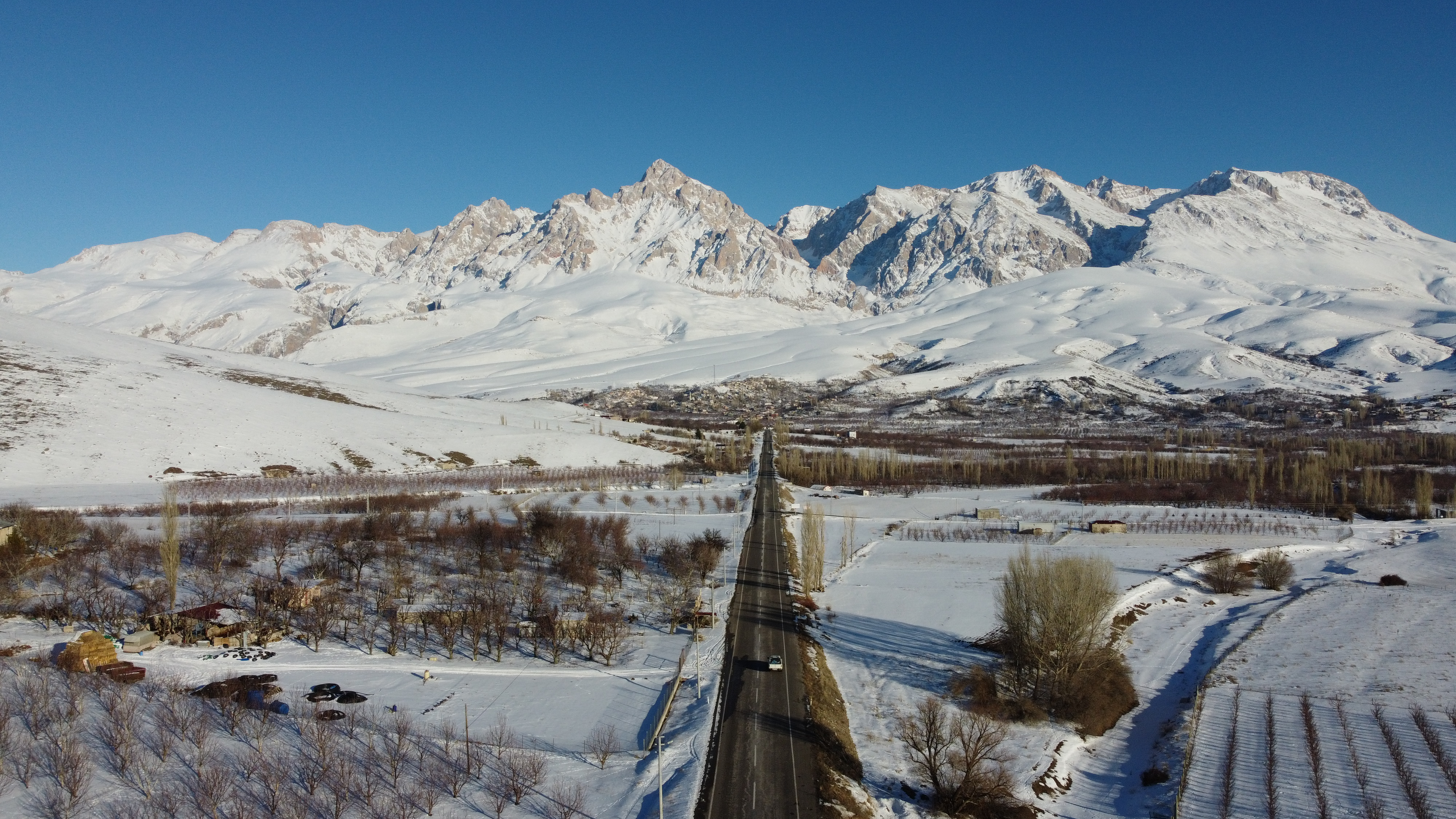
Çukurbağ village and Demirkazık

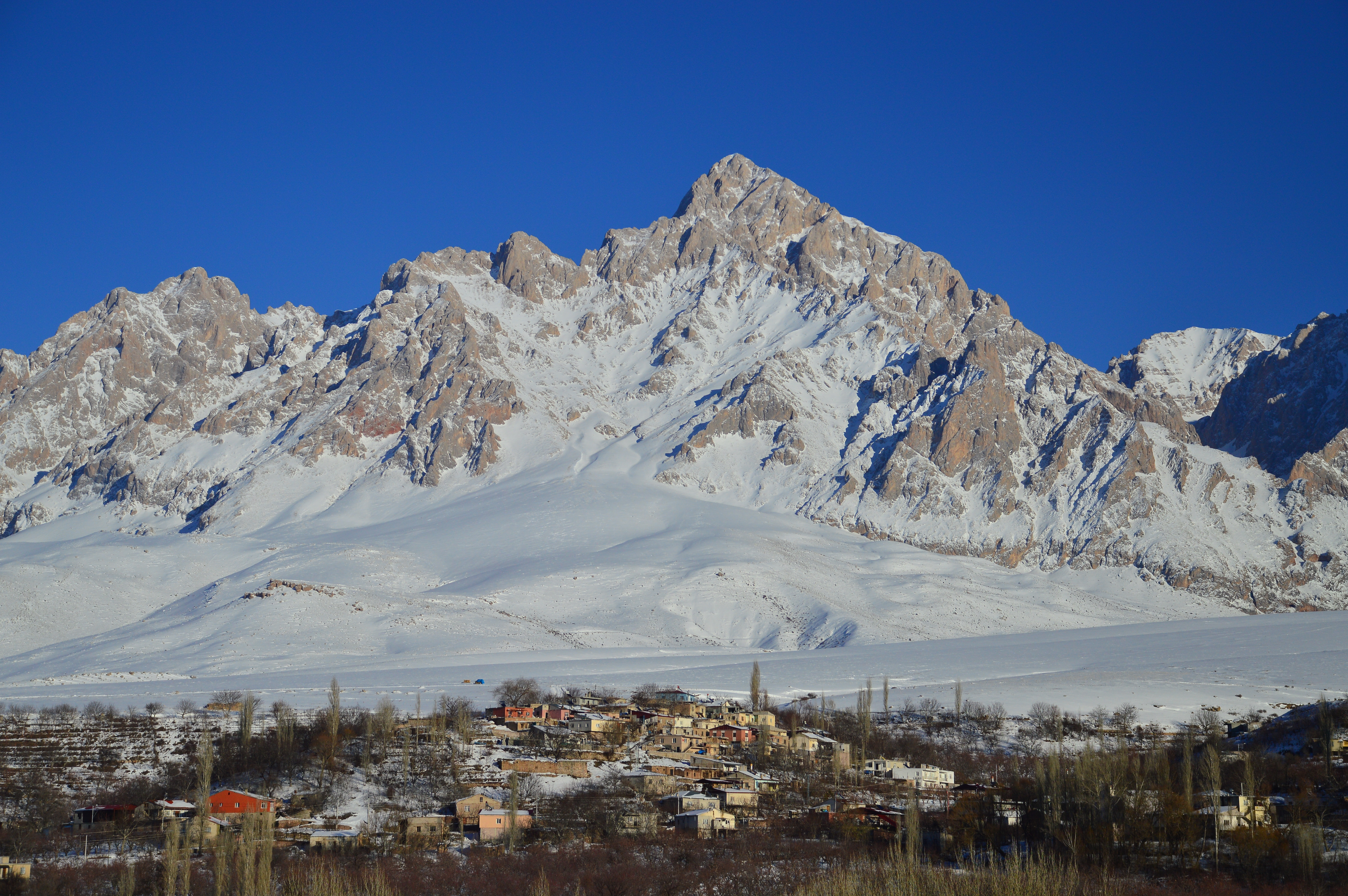
Çukurbağ village

== See also ==
- List of ultras of West Asia
