= Yeniköy, Çamardı =

Yeniköy
- Village
- Location within Turkey Location within Turkey Central Anatolia
- Coordinates: 37°42′44″N 34°55′11″E
- Country: Turkey
- Province: Niğde
- District: Çamardı
- Population (2022): 487
- Time zone: UTC+3 (TRT)

Yeniköy is a village in the Çamardı District of Niğde Province, Turkey. Its population is 487 (2022).
