= Çamardı District =

District of Niğde Province, Turkey

- District
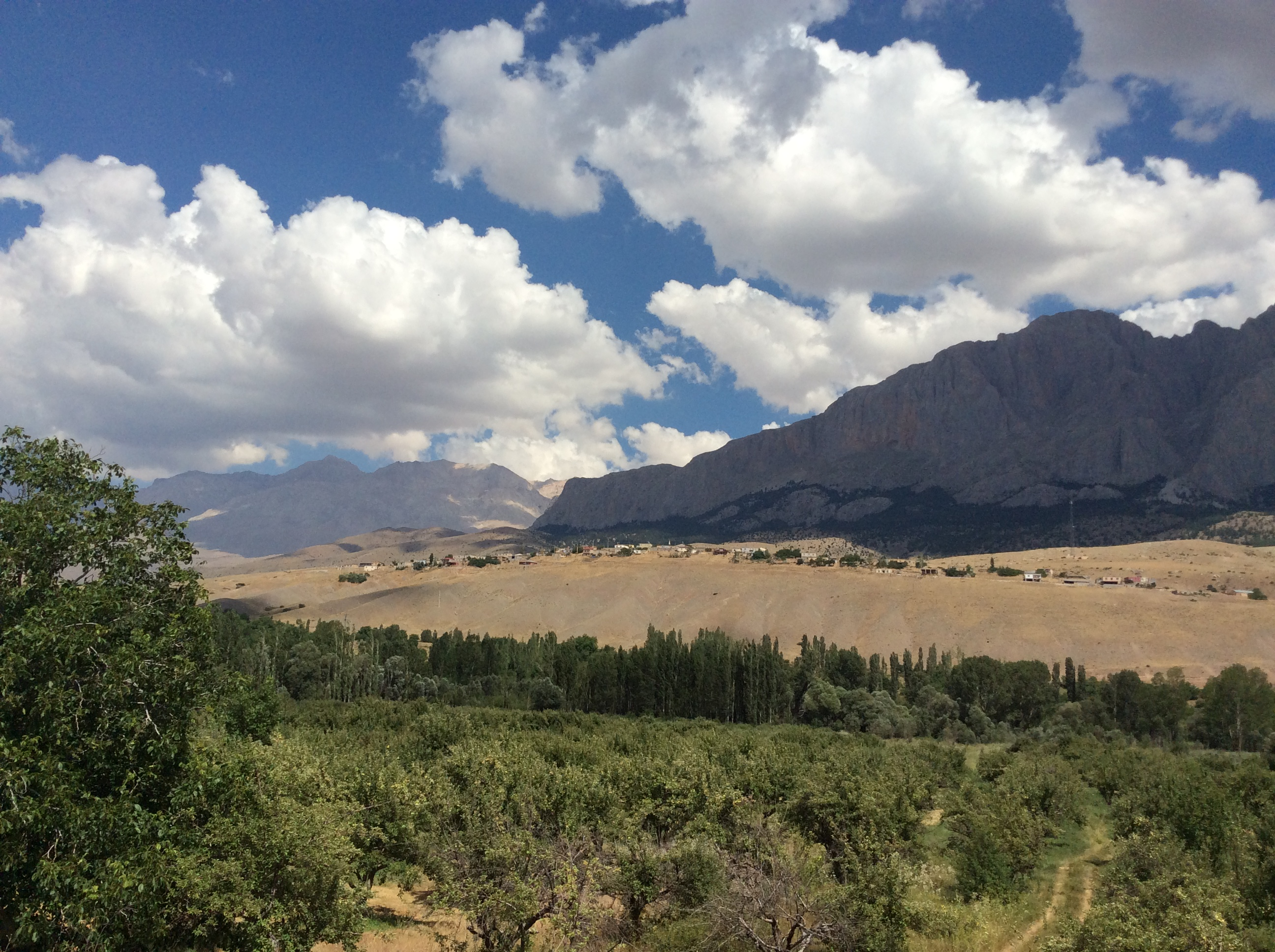
- Elekgölü and hills, Çamardı

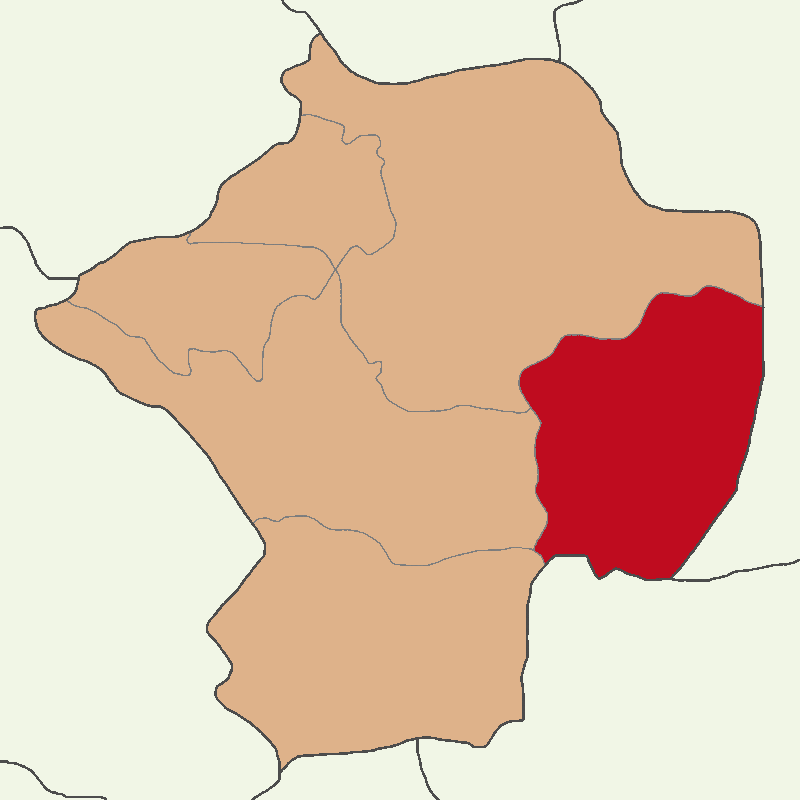
- Map showing Çamardı District in Niğde Province

- Location within Turkey Location within Turkey Central Anatolia
- Coordinates: 37°50′N 34°59′E
- Country: Turkey
- Province: Niğde
- Seat: Çamardı

Government
  - Kaymakam: İlhan Kayaş
- Area: 1,163 km^{2} (449 sq mi)
- Population (2022): 11,495
  - Density: 9.884/km^{2} (25.60/sq mi)
- Time zone: UTC+3 (TRT)
- Website: www.camardi.gov.tr

Çamardı District is a district of the Niğde Province of Turkey. Its seat is the town of Çamardı. Its area is 1,163 km^{2}, and its population is 11,495 (2022).

== Composition ==
There is one municipality in Çamardı District:

- Çamardı

There are 21 villages in Çamardı District:

- Bademdere
- Bekçili
- Beyazkışlakçı
- Burç
- Çardacık
- Celaller
- Çukurbağ
- Demirkazık
- Elekgölü
- Eynelli
- Kavaklıgöl
- Kavlaktepe
- Kocapınar
- Mahmatlı
- Örenköy
- Orhaniye
- Pınarbaşı
- Sulucaova
- Üçkapılı
- Yelatan
- Yeniköy
