= Yelatan =

- Village
- Location within Turkey Location within Turkey Central Anatolia
- Coordinates: 37°42′N 35°00′E
- Country: Turkey
- Province: Niğde
- District: Çamardı
- Elevation: 1,383 m (4,537 ft)
- Population (2022): 858
- Time zone: UTC+3 (TRT)

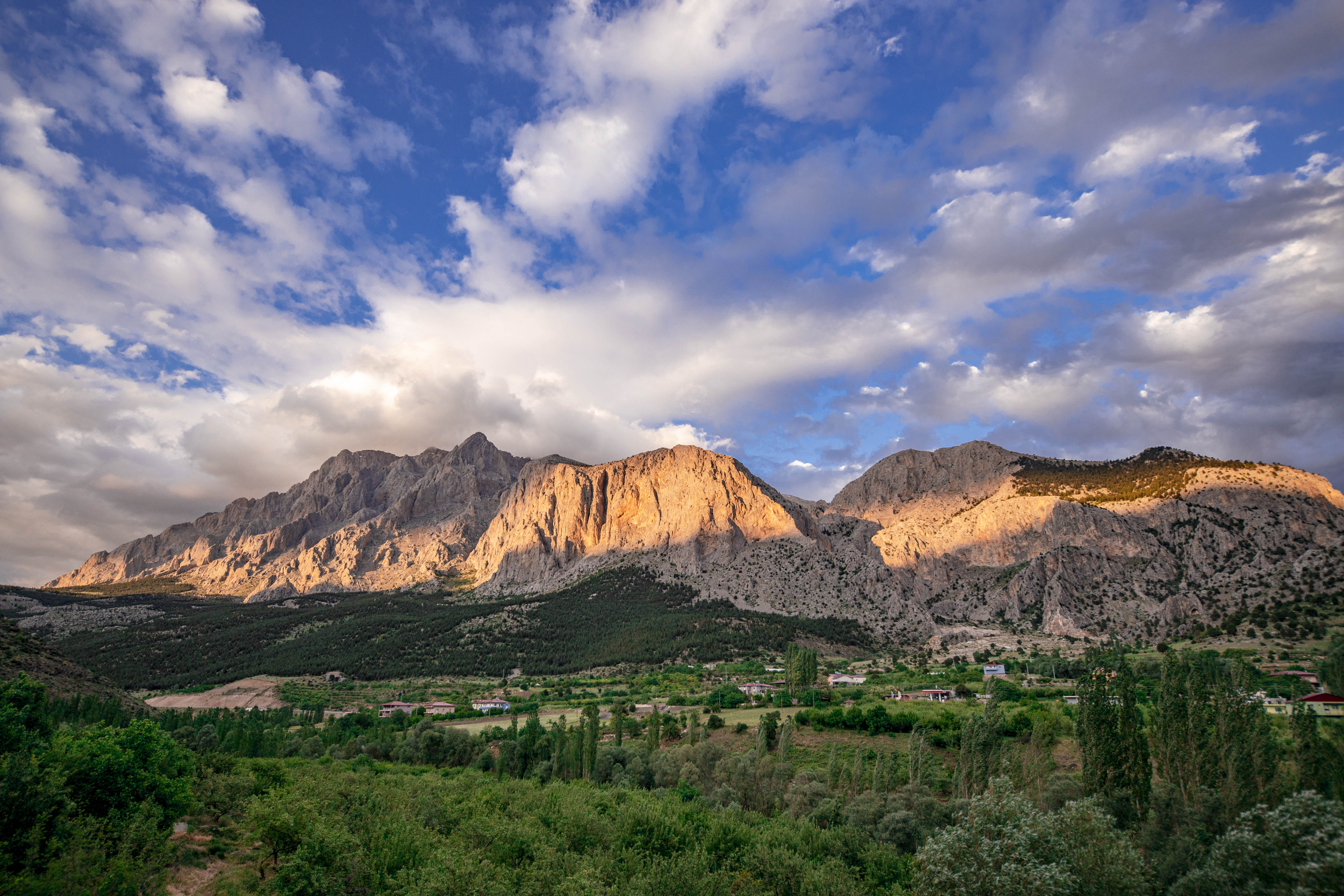
Yelatan village

Yelatan is a village in Çamardı District of Niğde Province, Turkey. Its population is 858 (2022). It is situated in the Taurus Mountains. The village is at the south of Çamardı.
