= Kemal Merkit =

Turkish motorcycle racer (1960–2012)

- Nationality: Turkish
- Born: 7 June 1960; Istanbul, Turkey
- Died: 7 September 2012 (aged 52); Meke Gölü, Konya, Turkey
- Bike number: 55

Mustafa Kemal Merkit (7 June 1960 – 7 September 2012), nicknamed "Desert Tiger" (Turkish: Çöl Kaplanı), was a Turkish motorcycle racer who competed in motocross and enduro. He was the first Turkish rider to take part in the Dakar Rally, starting the event nine times, and was killed in a crash during the 2012 Transanatolia Rally Raid.

== Career ==
Merkit grew up in Istanbul and studied business administration in Vienna. He began racing motorcycles in the 1980s and 1990s while living in Bodrum, and was a founding member of the Bodrum Motorcycle Club in 1998.

In 2002 he became the first Turkish rider to compete in the Dakar Rally in the motorcycle class. He entered the event nine times and finished it six times, taking first place in the "riders without service support" category in 2010 and second in the same category in 2011.

== Death ==
On 7 September 2012, during the third day of the Transanatolia Rally Raid, Merkit and Italian rider Mirco Miotto had stopped on the Meke Gölü stage to check their roadbooks. A 19-year-old Dutch rider, Wouter Vaarkamp, hit them from behind at high speed in heavy dust. Merkit and Vaarkamp were killed; Miotto escaped with minor injuries. The organisers and competitors decided that the rally would continue, and a tribute convoy was held.

== Legacy ==
The opening round of the 2013 Turkish Enduro Championship in Bodrum was dedicated to Merkit.
