= Çamardı =

- Municipality
- Location in Turkey Çamardı (Turkey Central Anatolia)
- Coordinates: 37°50′11″N 34°59′34″E
- Country: Turkey
- Province: Niğde
- District: Çamardı

Government
  - Mayor: Ali Pınar (AKP)
- Elevation: 1,532 m (5,026 ft)
- Population (2022): 3,408
- Time zone: UTC+3 (TRT)
- Area code: 0388
- Website: www.camardi.bel.tr

Çamardı is a town in Niğde Province in the Central Anatolia region of Turkey, at the foot of Aladağ in the Taurus Mountains. It is the seat of Çamardı District. Its population is 3,408 (2022). Its elevation is 1,532 m (5,026 ft).
