= Anti-Taurus Mountains =

Mountain range in southern and eastern Turkey

Coordinates: 37°49′N 35°10′E

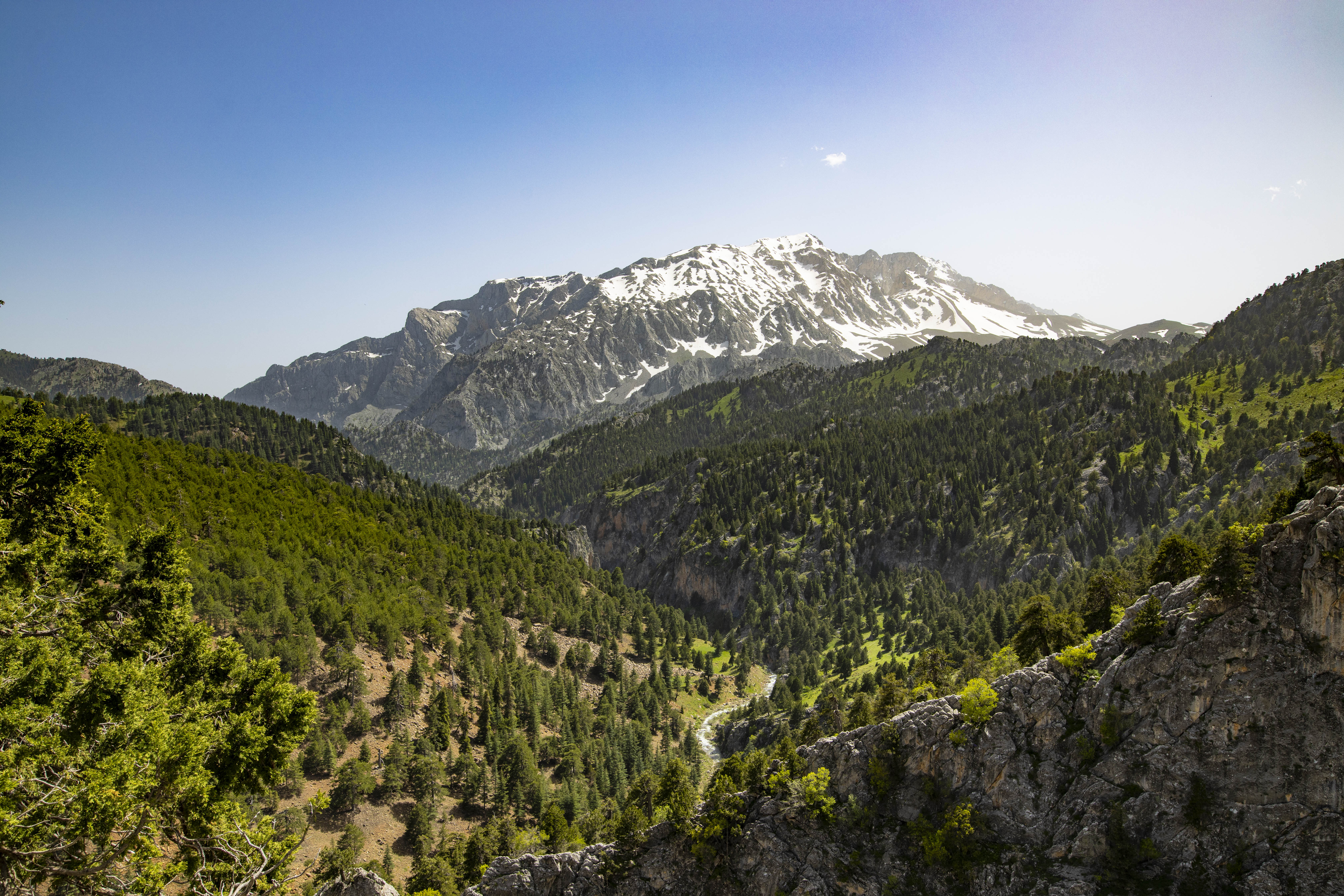
Aladağlar National Park

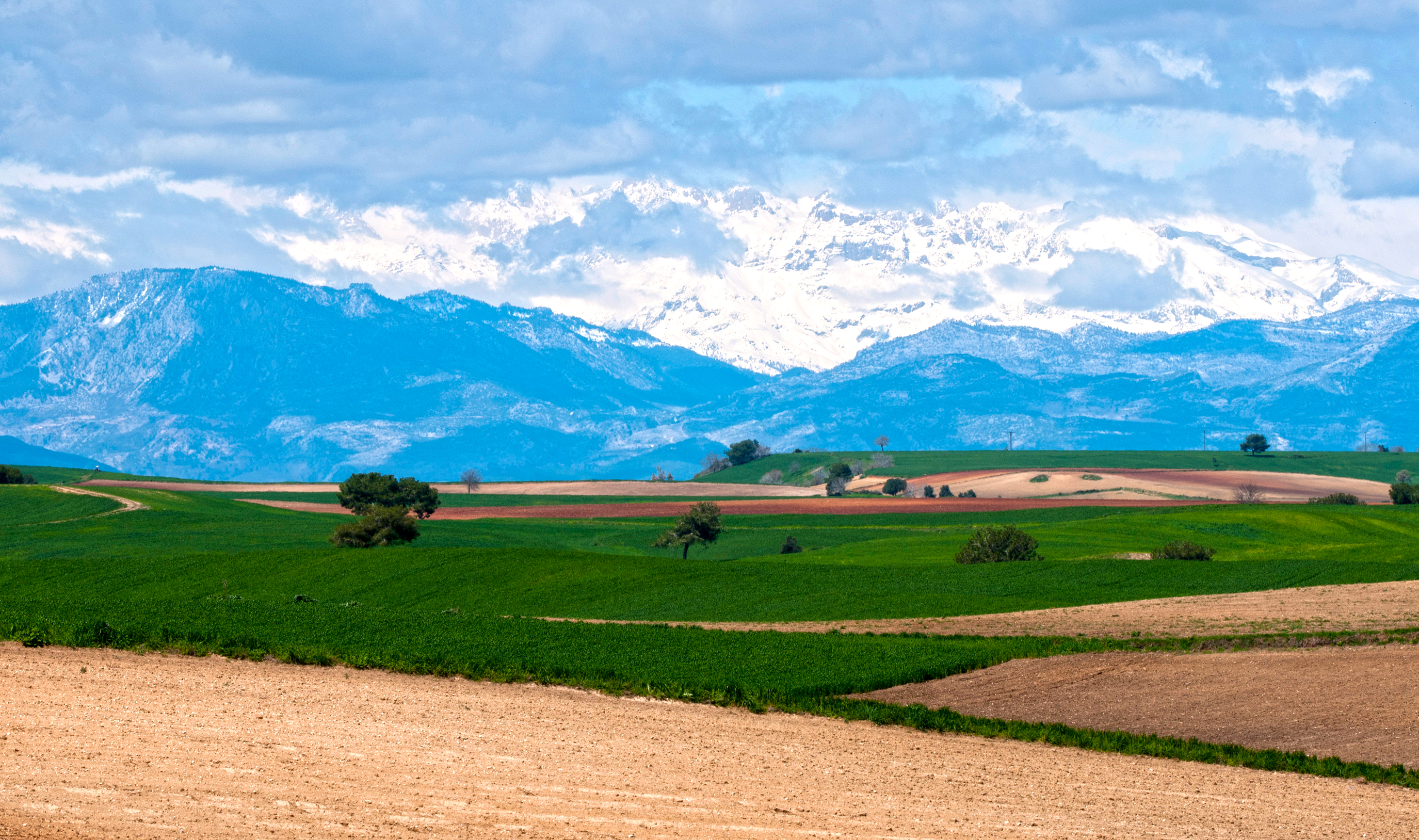
Fields in Ceyhan, Adana with Turkey, the Taurus Mountains and Aladağlar behind them

The Anti-Taurus Mountains (from Greek: Αντίταυρος) or Aladaglar are a mountain range in southern and eastern Turkey, curving northeast from the Taurus Mountains.

At 12,851 feet (3,917 m), Mount Erciyes (Turkish: Erciyes Dağı) is the highest peak not just in the range but in central Anatolia as a whole. It is a massive stratovolcano located in the northern part of the Anti-Taurus. The ancient Greek geographer and historian Strabo wrote that in his time the summit was never free of snow and that the few climbers who ascended it could see both the Black Sea and the Mediterranean.

Parts of the Anti-Taurus Mountains are protected within the Aladağlar National Park.
