= Taurus Mountains =

Mountain range in southern Turkey

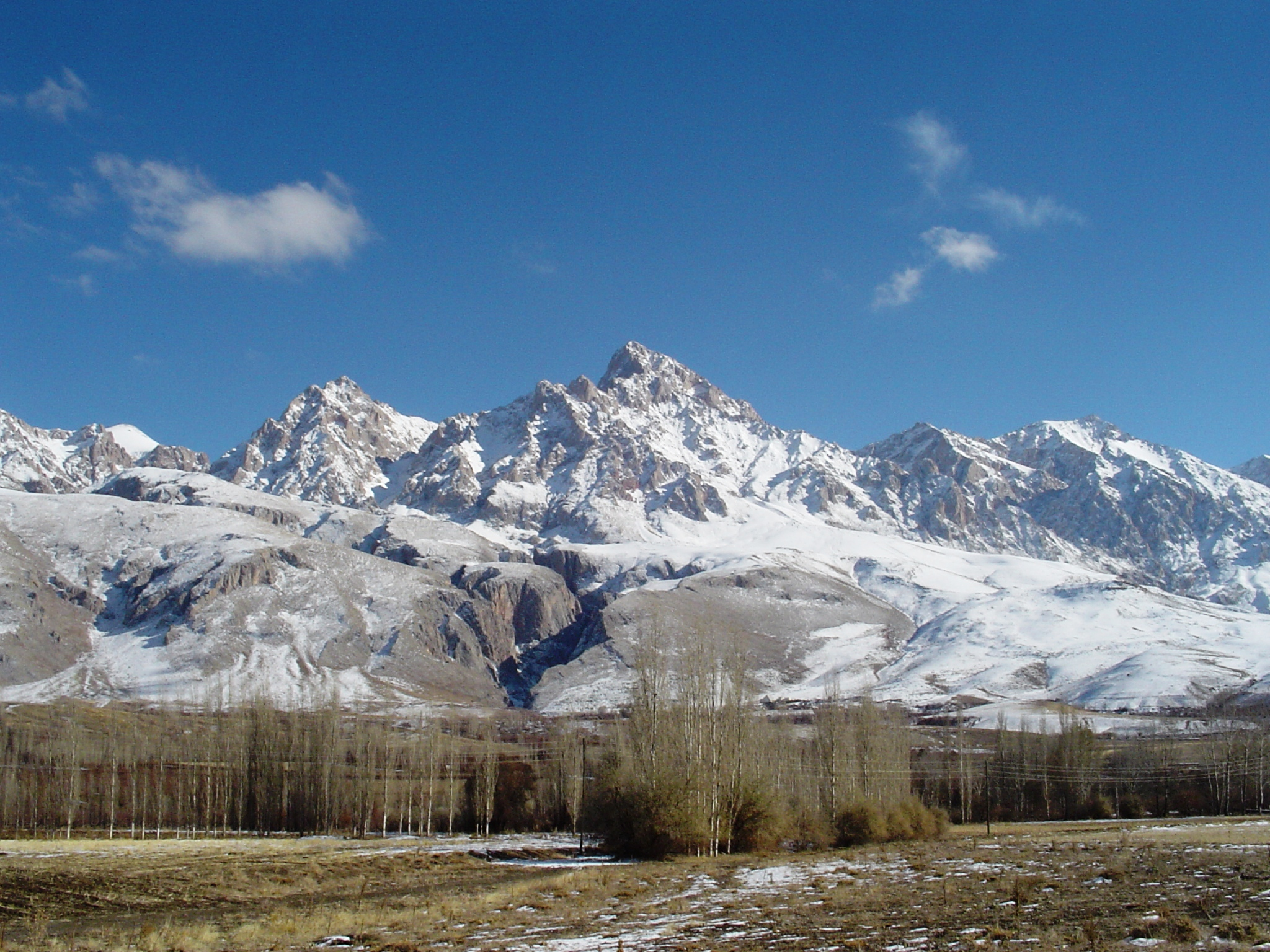
- Demirkazık in Niğde Province

Highest point
- Peak: Mt. Demirkazık (3,756 m)

Naming
- Native name: Toros Dağları (Turkish)

Geography
- Country: Turkey
- Range coordinates: 37°N 33°E

The Taurus Mountains (Turkish: Toros Dağları, usually shortened to Toroslar) are a mountain complex in southern Turkey, separating the Mediterranean coastal region on the Levantine Sea from the central Anatolian Plateau. The system extends along a curve from Lake Eğirdir in the west to the upper reaches of the Euphrates and Tigris rivers in the east. It is a part of the Alpide belt in Eurasia. The mountain range was also known as Mons Masius in the antiquity.

== Etymology ==
The mountain range under the current name was mentioned in The Histories by Polybius as Greek: Ταῦρος (Taûros). Heinrich Kiepert writes in Lehrbuch der alten Geographie that the name was borrowed into Ancient Greek from the Semitic (Old Aramaic) root טורא (ṭūrā), meaning "mountain".

== Geography ==
The Taurus Mountains are divided into three chains from west to east as follows;

- Western Taurus (Batı Toroslar)
- Central Taurus (Orta Toroslar)
- Southeastern Taurus (Güneydoğu Toroslar)

=== Western Taurus ===
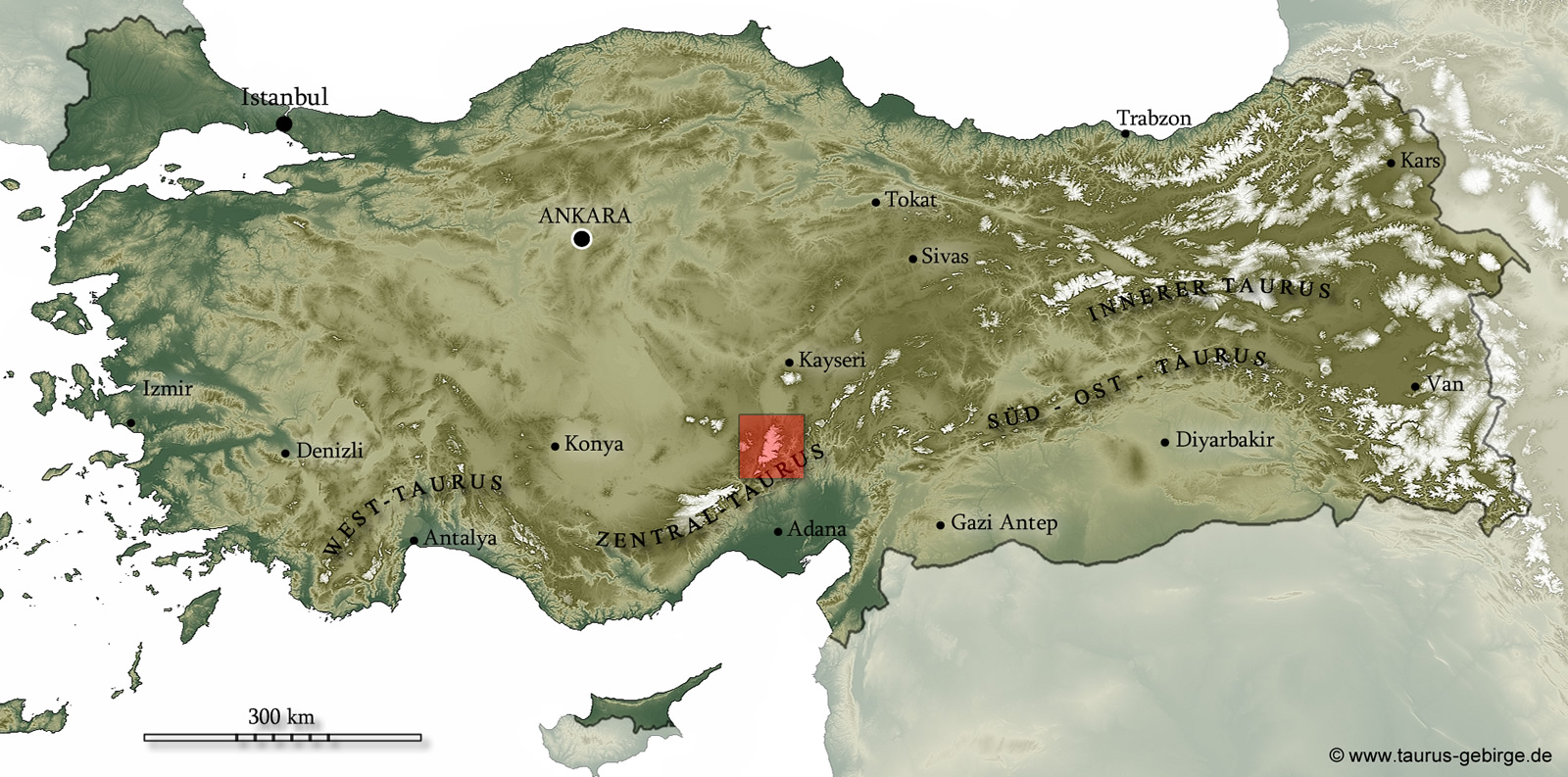
Relief of Western, Central, and Southeastern Taurus Mountains

The Western Taurus Mountains form an arc around the Gulf of Antalya. It includes the Akdağlar, Bey Mountains, Katrancık Mountain, Kuyucak Mountains, and Geyik Mountains. The East Taşeli Plateau and Goksu River divide it from the Central Taurus Mountains. It has many peaks rising above 3,000–3,700 m (9,800–12,100 ft). Mt. Kizlarsivrisi, 3,086 m (10,125 ft), in the Bey Mountains is the highest peak in the Western Taurus.

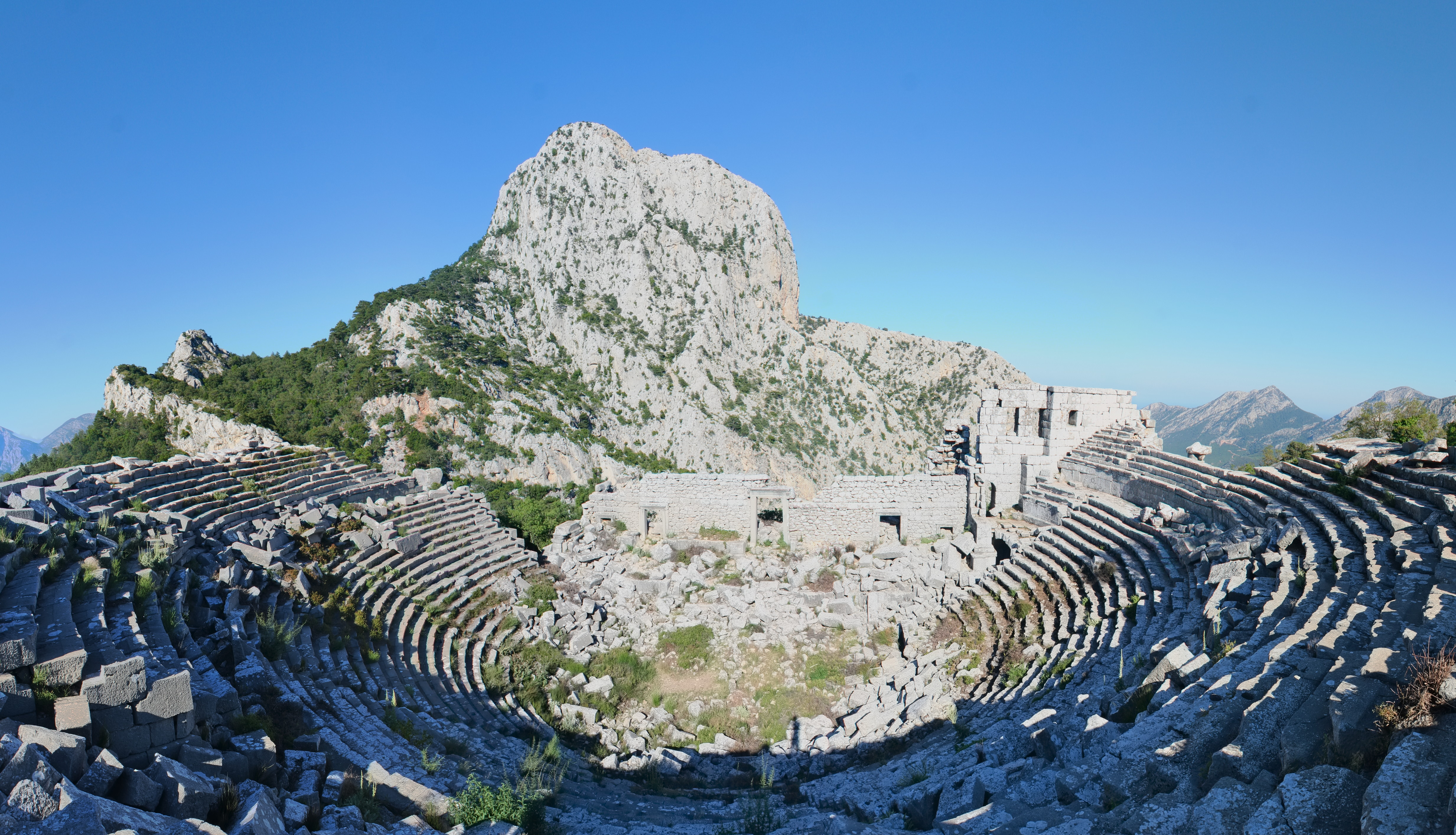
Termessos is an ancient city in the western Taurus

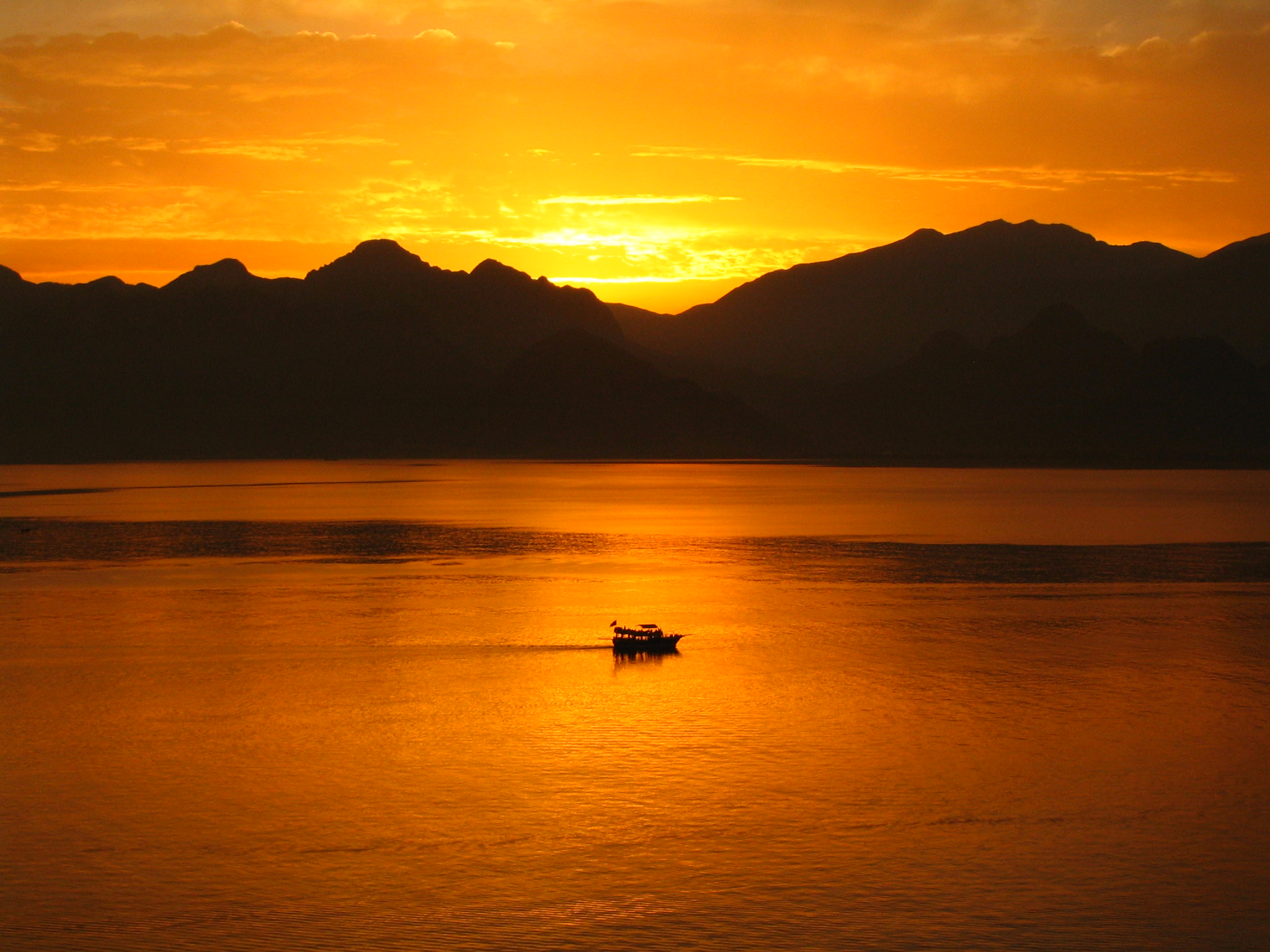
Antalya with the sunset and mountains in the west

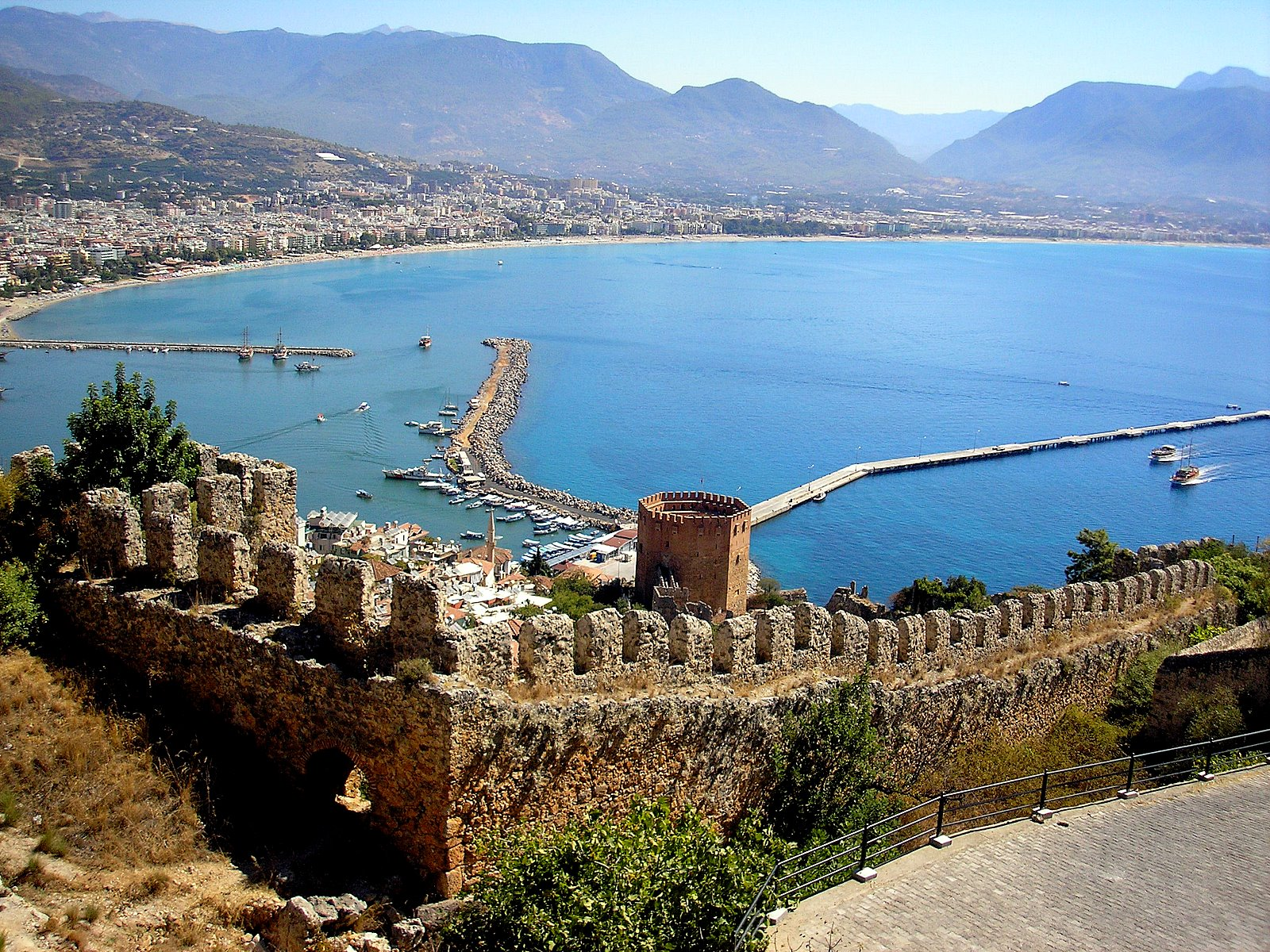
Alanya, and the surrounding mountains

=== Central Taurus ===
The Central Taurus Mountains are roughly defined to include northern Mersin Province and northwestern Adana Province. The highest point in the Central Taurus is Mt. Demirkazık (3,756m). The Cilician Gates or Gülek Pass has been the principal pass through the Eastern Taurus since ancient times, connecting the coastal plain of Cilicia with Central Anatolia. The Tarsus-Ankara Highway (E90, O-21) passes through it. Mountain ranges in the Central Taurus include:

- Akçalı Mountains, western
- Bolkar Mountains, central, highest peak Mt. Medetsiz 3,524 m (11,562 ft)
- Aladaglar mountain range, central, highest peak Mt. Kızılkaya 3,771 m (12,372 ft)
- Tahtalı Mountains or Anti-Taurus Mountains
- Munzur Mountains, eastern, highest peak Mt. Akbaba 3,462 m (11,358 ft)
  - Mercan mountain range, within the Munzur
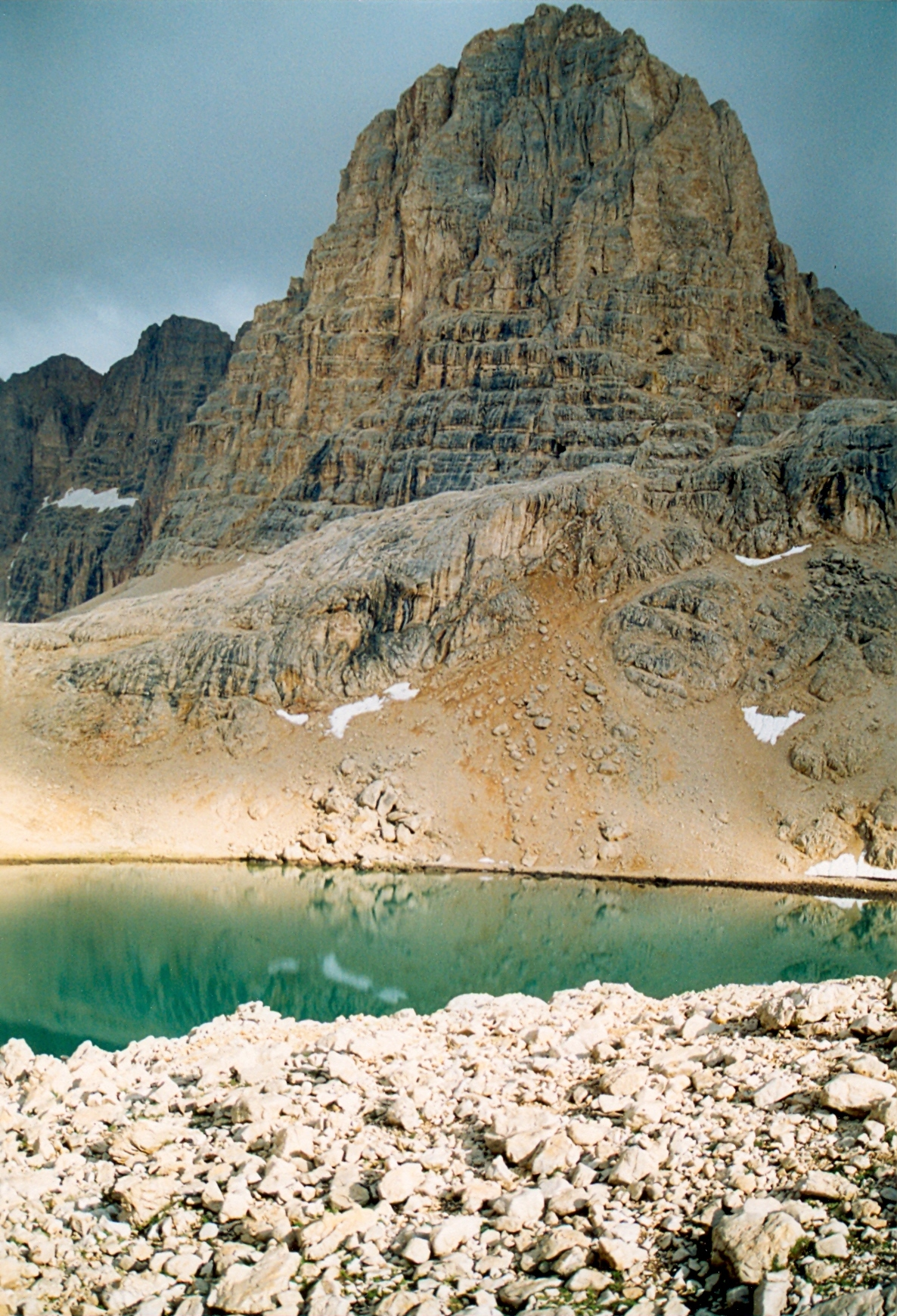
Aladağlar

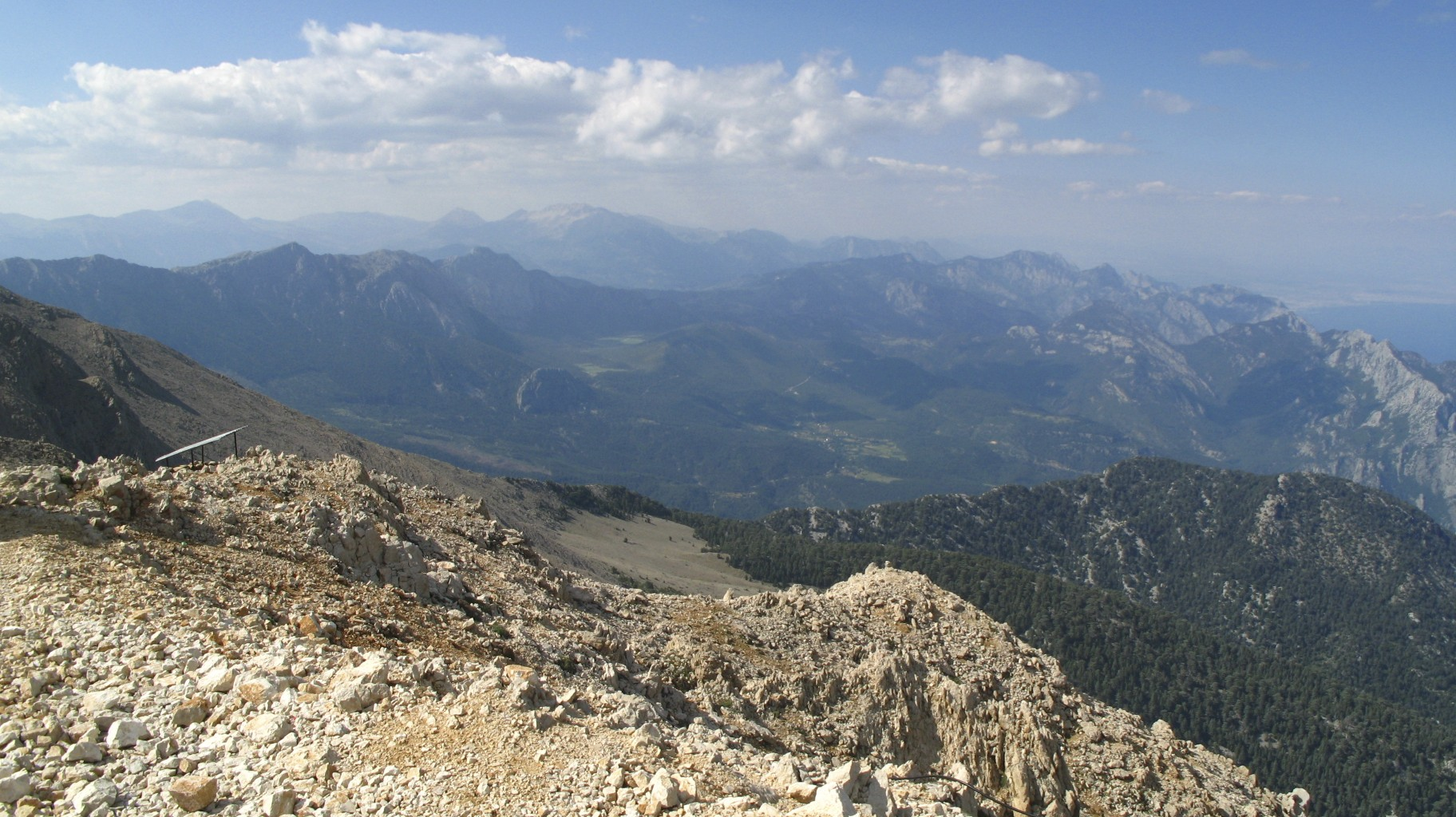
Tahtalı Mountains

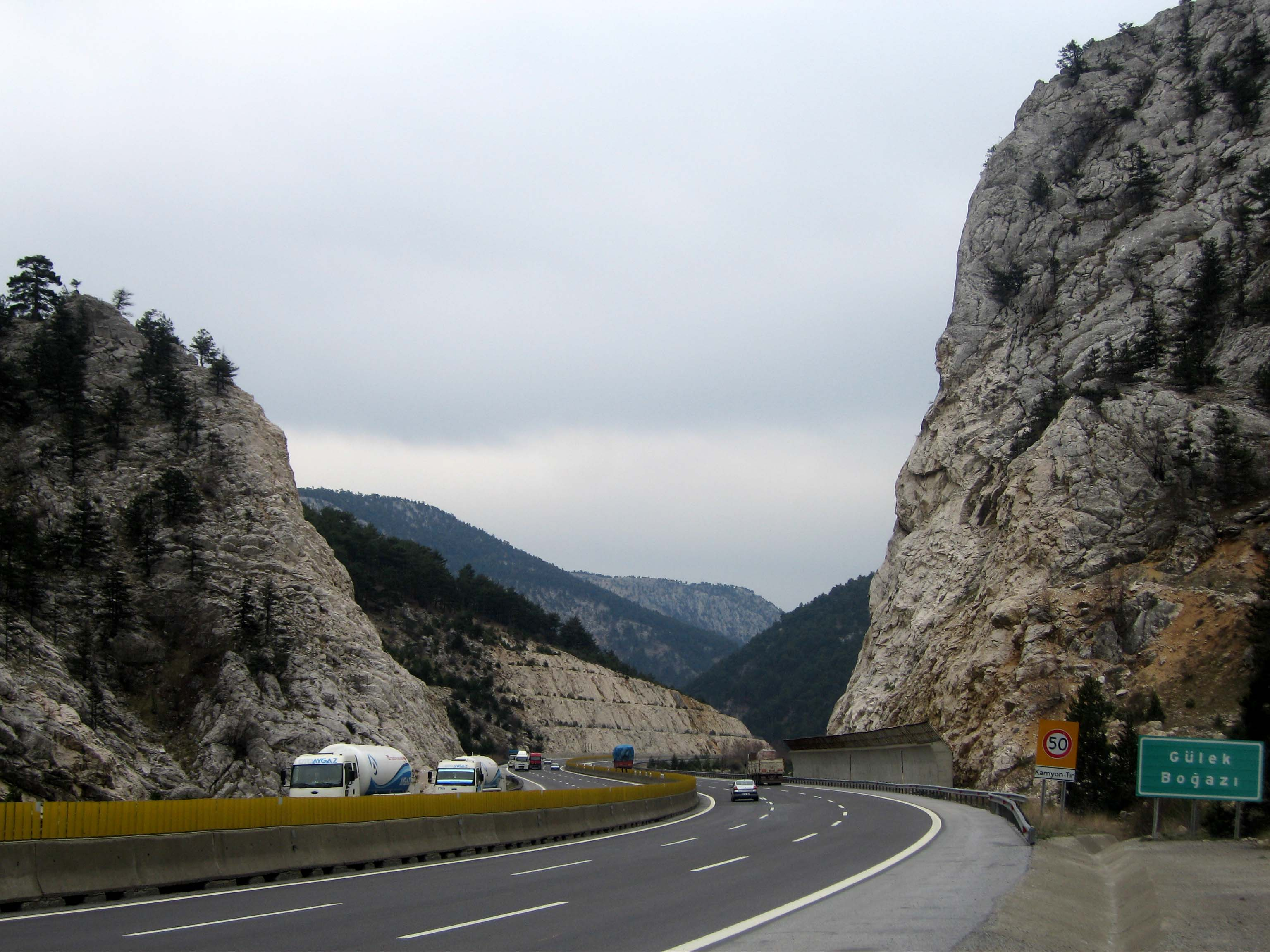
Gülek, Mersin Province

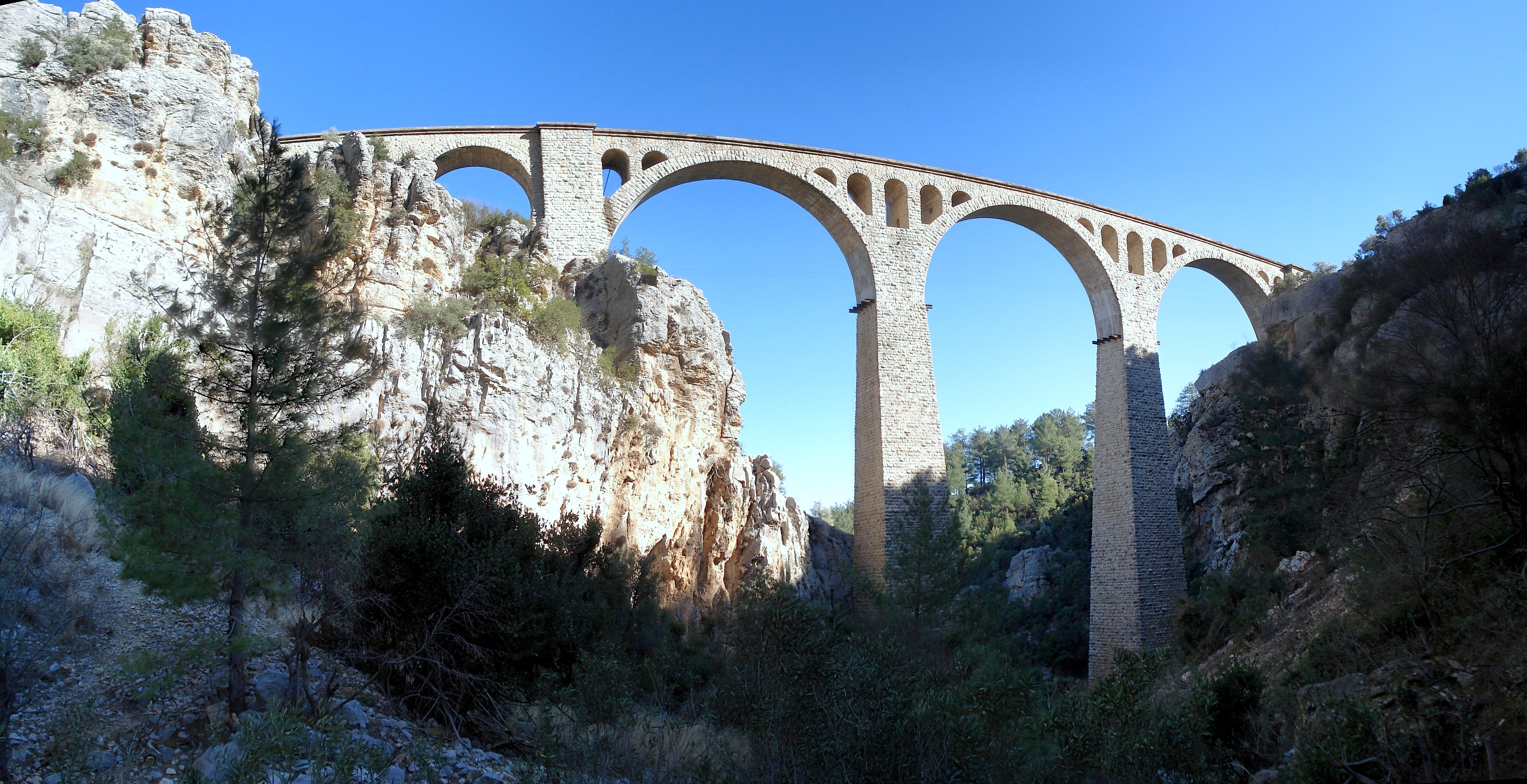
Railway viaduct, Adana Province

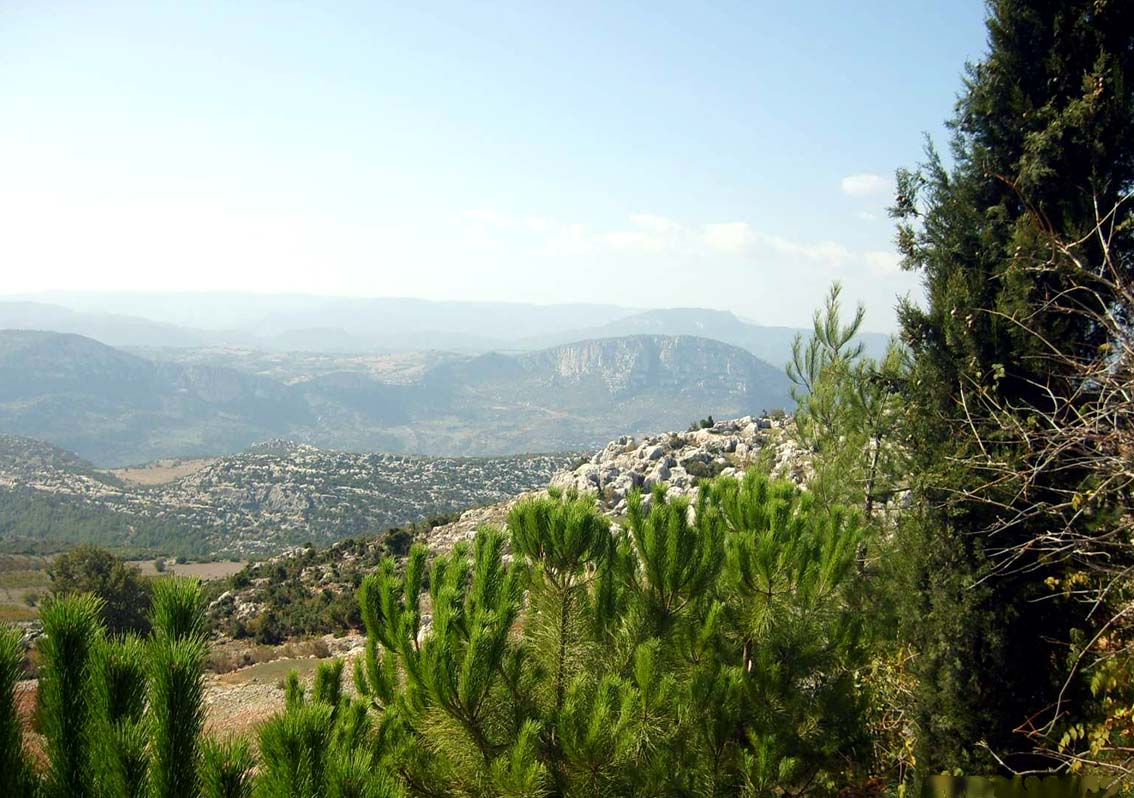
Near Mersin

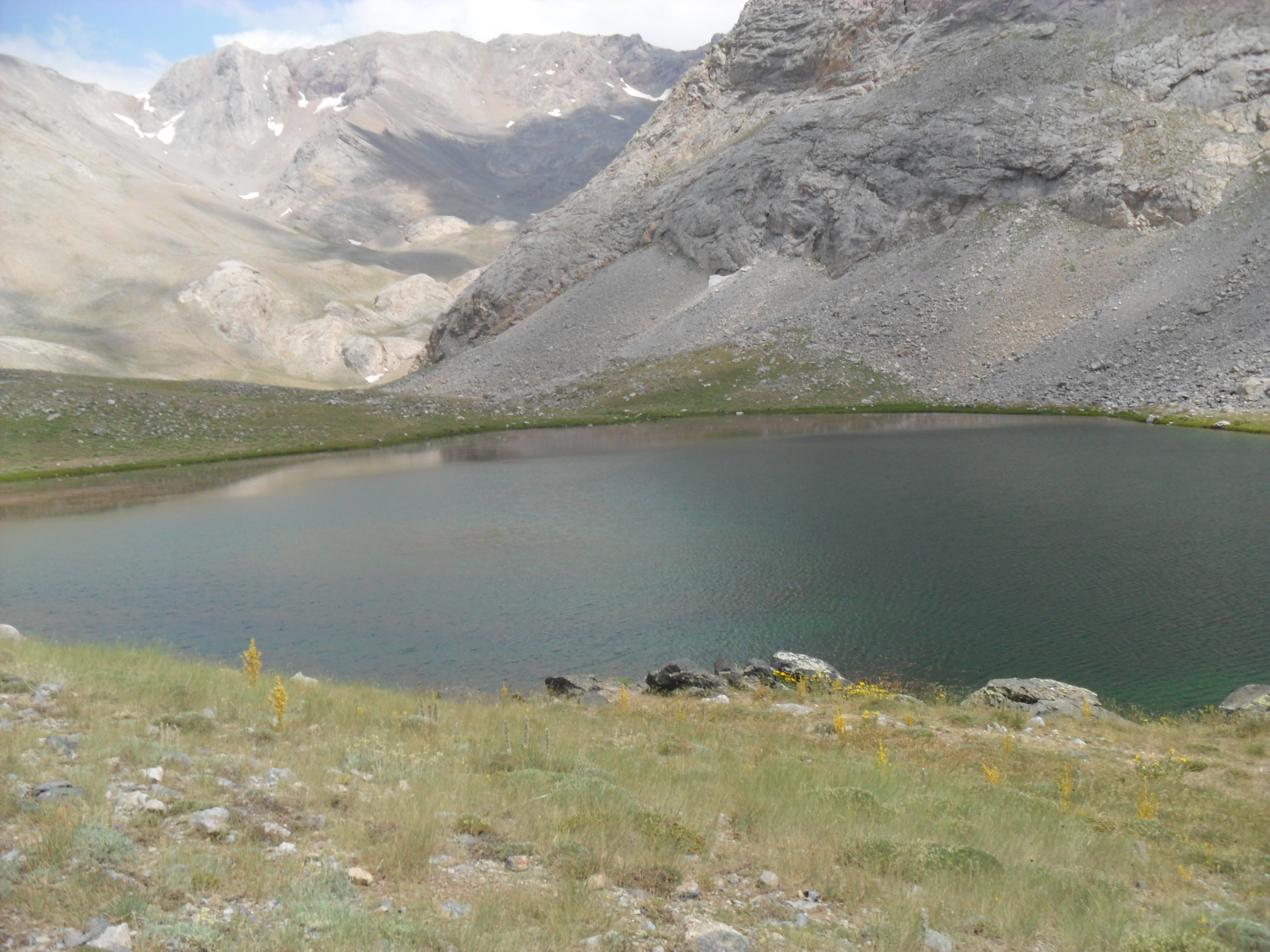
Lake (Karagöl) near the summit

=== Southeastern Taurus ===
The Southeastern Taurus Mountains form the northern boundary of the Southeastern Anatolia Region and North Mesopotamia. They include the Nurhak Mountains, Malatya Mountains, Maden Mountains, Genç Mountains, and Bitlis Mountains. They are in the watershed of the Euphrates River and Tigris River.

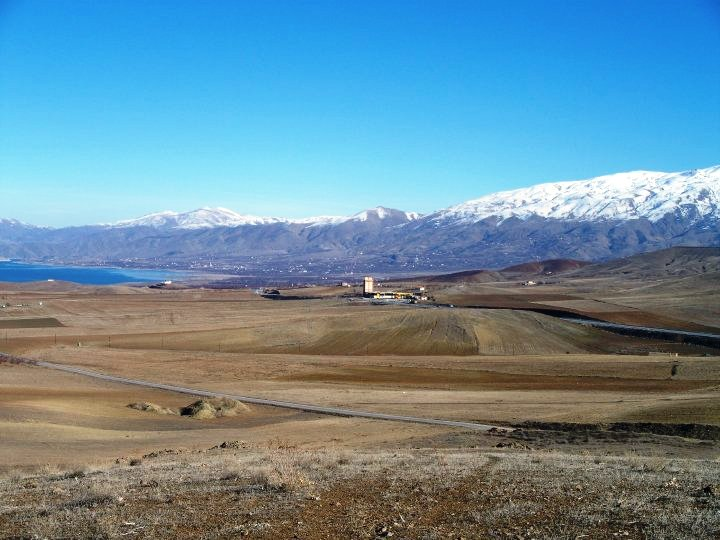
Malatya's Kale district and the Southeastern Taurus

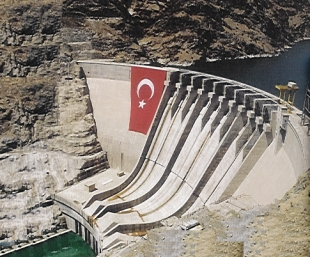
Karakaya Dam.

== Geology ==
The Taurus Mountains were formed by the collision of the African and Eurasian tectonic plates. The predominant underlying rock is limestone. In the Aladaglar and Bolkar mountains, limestone has eroded to form karstic landscapes of waterfalls, underground rivers, and some of the largest caves of Asia. The Manavgat River originates on the southern slopes of the Beydaglari range.

== Climate ==
The mountains have a Mediterranean climate, with dry summers and rainy winters. Temperatures vary with elevation, with warm winters on the lower coastal slopes and cold winters in the high mountains and in the interior.

== Flora and fauna ==
At lower elevations, the predominant vegetation forest and woodland of evergreen oaks and Turkish pine (Pinus brutia), and areas of maquis shrubland. Above 1200 meters elevation are montane forests of black pine (Pinus nigra), Lebanon cedar (Cedrus libani), Taurus fir (Abies cilicica), and juniper (Juniperus spp.). The high peaks are home to alpine meadows.

== History ==
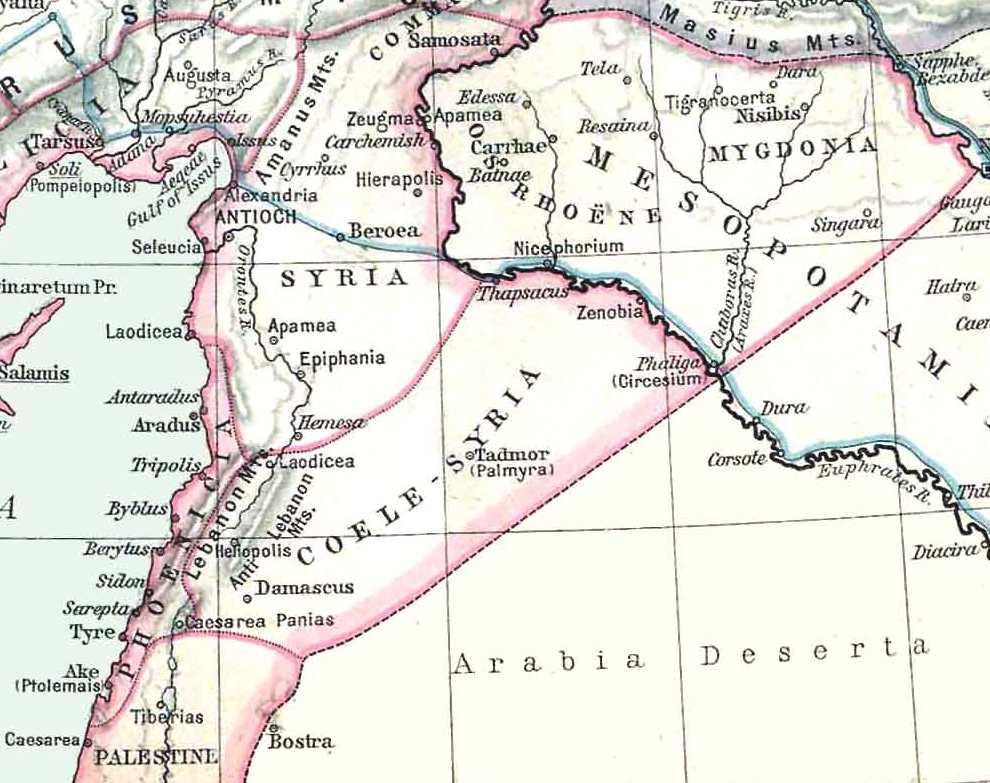
Amanus Mountains near the Gulf of Issus and Antioch

Armenian refugees at Taurus Pass

=== Pre-history and early Roman period ===
The bull was commonly the symbol and depiction of ancient Near Eastern storm gods, hence Taurus the bull, and hence the name of the mountains. The mountains are a place of many ancient storm-god temples. Torrential thunderstorms in these mountains were deemed by the ancient Syrians to be the work of the storm-god Adad to make the Tigris and Euphrates rivers rise and flood and thereby fertilise their land. The Hurrians, probably originators of the various storm-gods of the ancient Near East, were a people whom modern scholars place in the Taurus Mountains at their probable earliest origins.

A Bronze Age archaeological site, where early evidence of tin mining was found, is at Kestel. The pass known in antiquity as the Cilician Gates crosses the range north of Tarsus.

The Amanus range in southern Turkey is where the Taurus Mountains are pushed up as three tectonic plates come together. The Amanus is a natural frontier: west is Cilicia, east is Syria. There are several passes, like the Amanian Gate (Bahçe Pass), which are of great strategical importance. In 333 BC at the Battle of Issus, Alexander the Great defeated Darius III in the foothills along the coast between these two passes. In the Second Temple period, Jewish authors seeking to establish with greater precision the geographical definition of the Promised Land, began to construe Mount Hor as a reference to the Amanus range of the Taurus Mountains, which marked the northern limit of the Syrian plain.

=== Late Roman period to present ===
During World War I, the German and Turkish railway system through the Taurus Mountains proved to be a major strategic objective of the Allies. This region was specifically mentioned as a strategically controlled objective slated for surrender to the Entente in the Armistice, which ended hostilities against the Ottoman Empire.

== Attractions ==
In addition to hiking and mountain climbing, there are two ski resorts on the mountain range, one at Davras about 25 km (16 mi) from the two nearest towns of Egirdir and Isparta, the second is Saklıkent 40 km (25 mi) from the city of Antalya.

The Varda Viaduct, situated on the railway lines Konya-Adana at Hacıkırı village in Adana Province, is a 98-metre-high (322 ft) railway bridge constructed in the 1910s by Germans.

== See also ==
- Ark of Nuh or Noah
- Armenian highlands
  - Mountains of Ararat
- Karaca Dağ near Diyarbakır
- Wildlife of the Levant
- River system of Mesopotamia
- Zagros Mountains
  - Mount Judi
