= Adana =

City in Turkey

- City
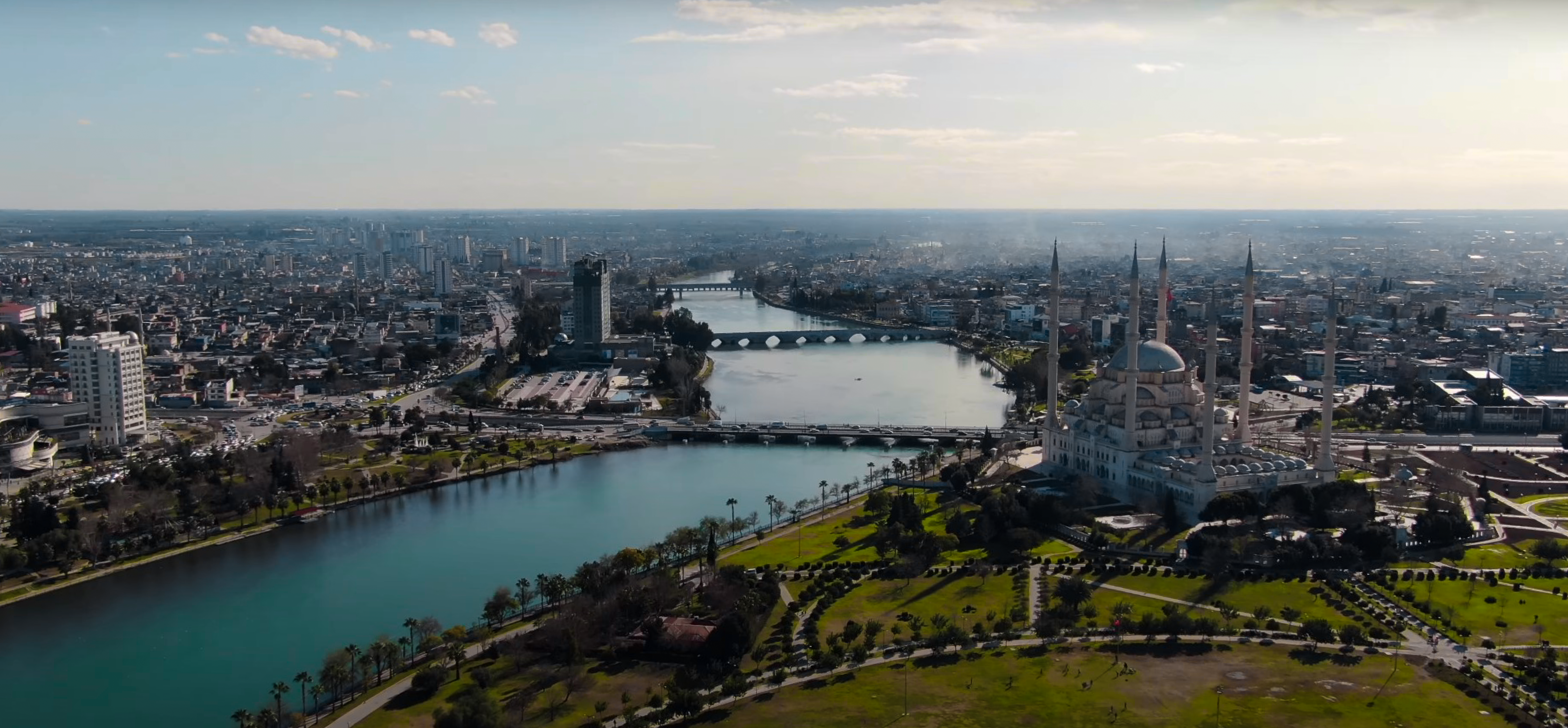
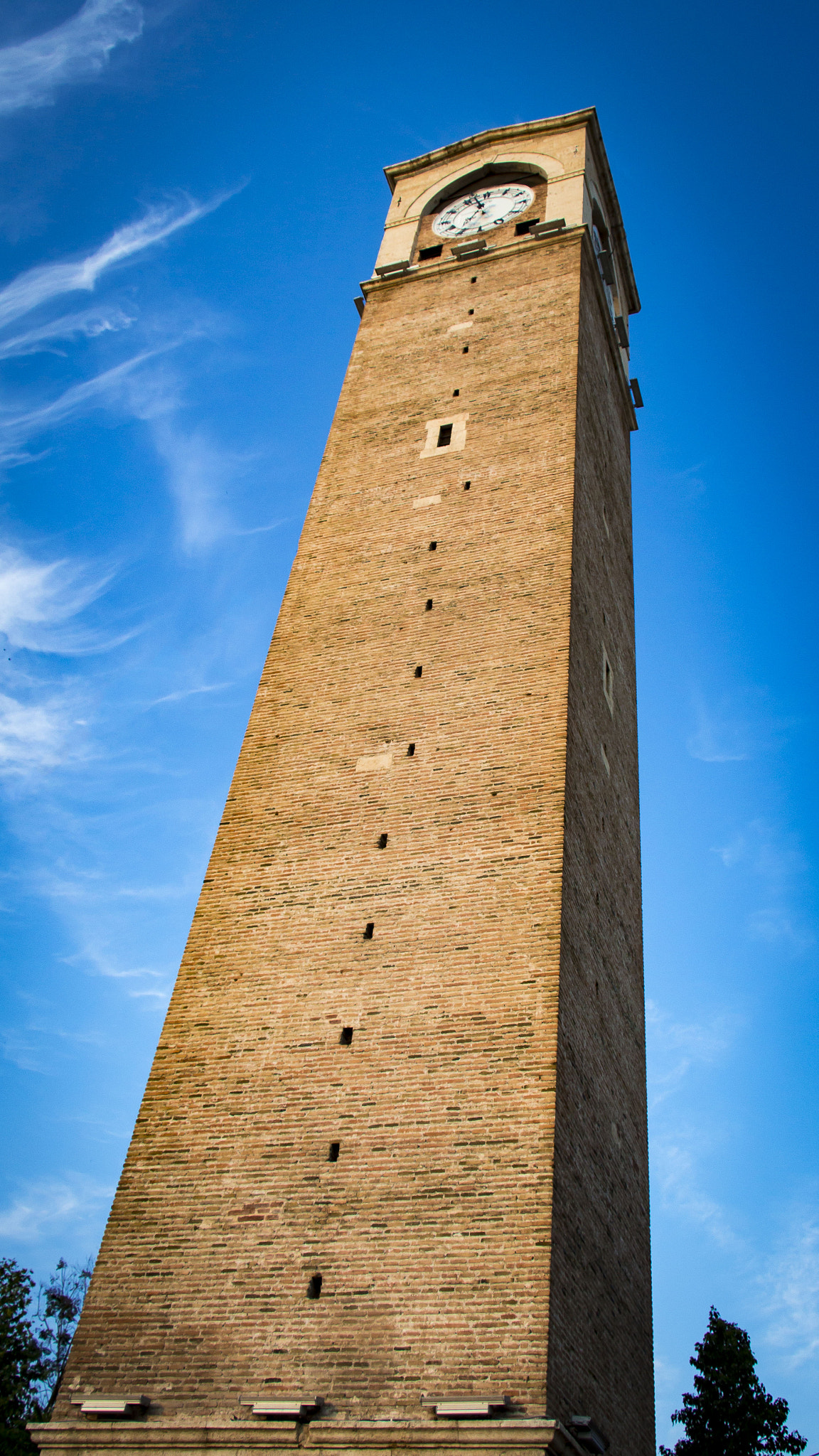
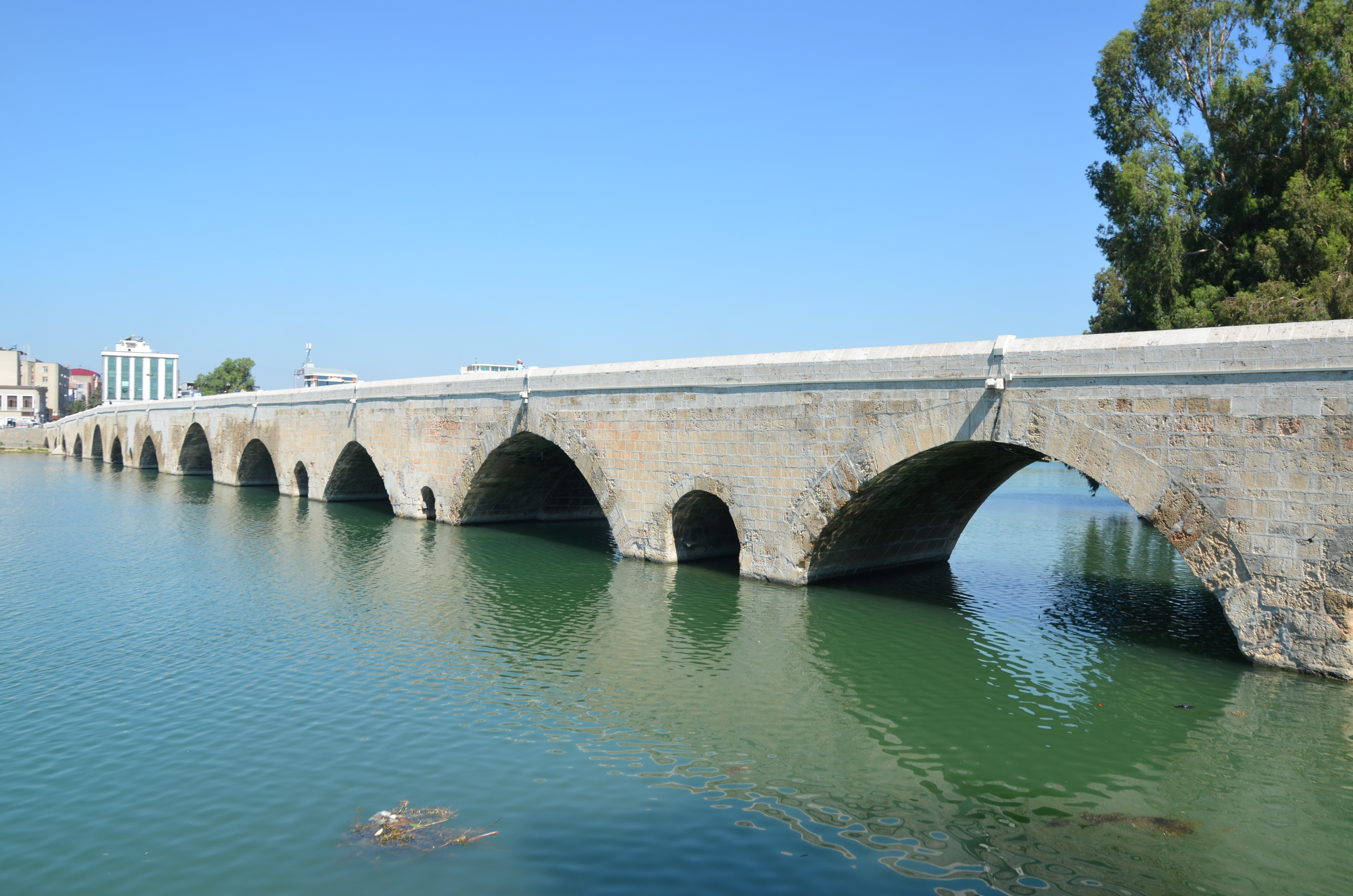
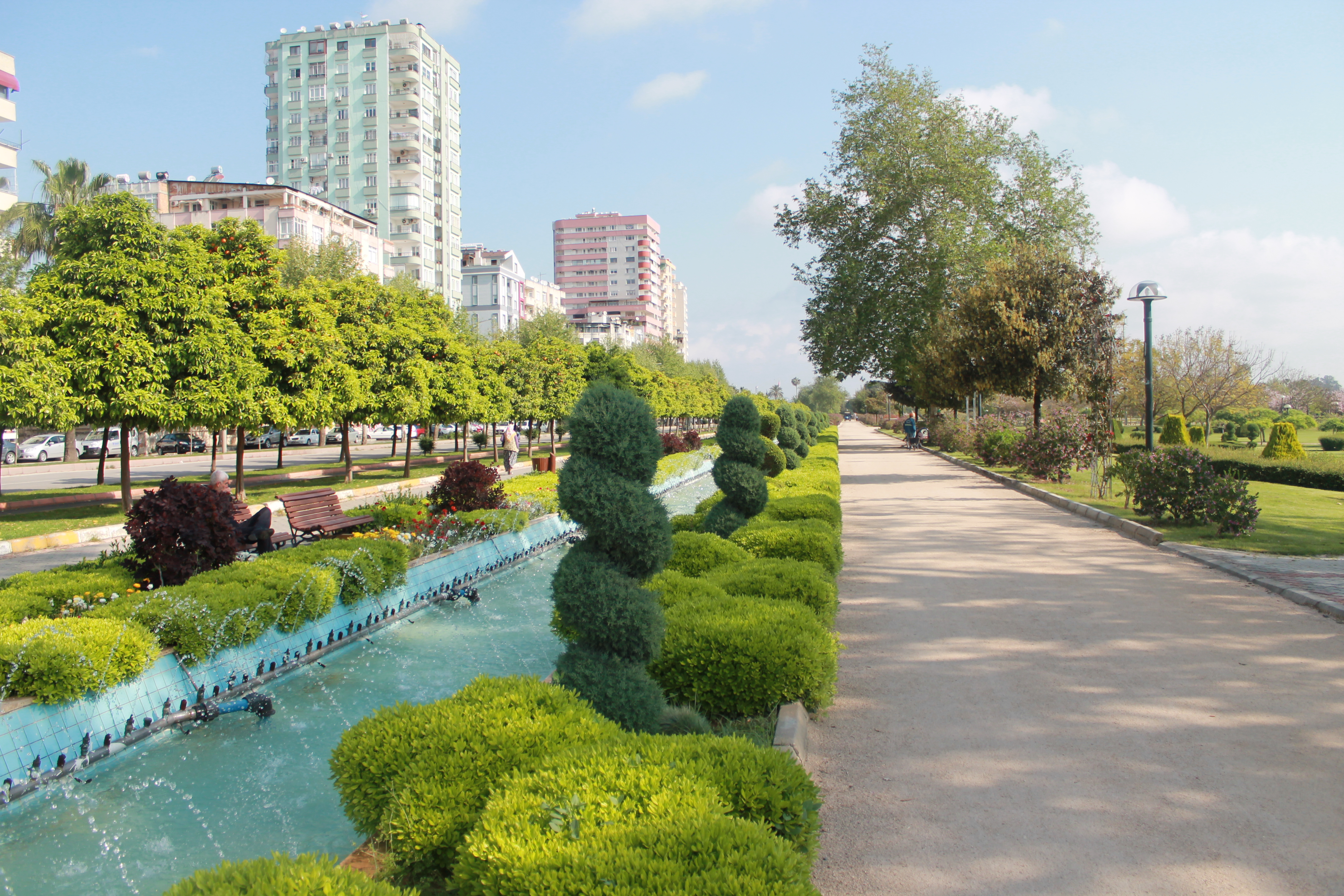
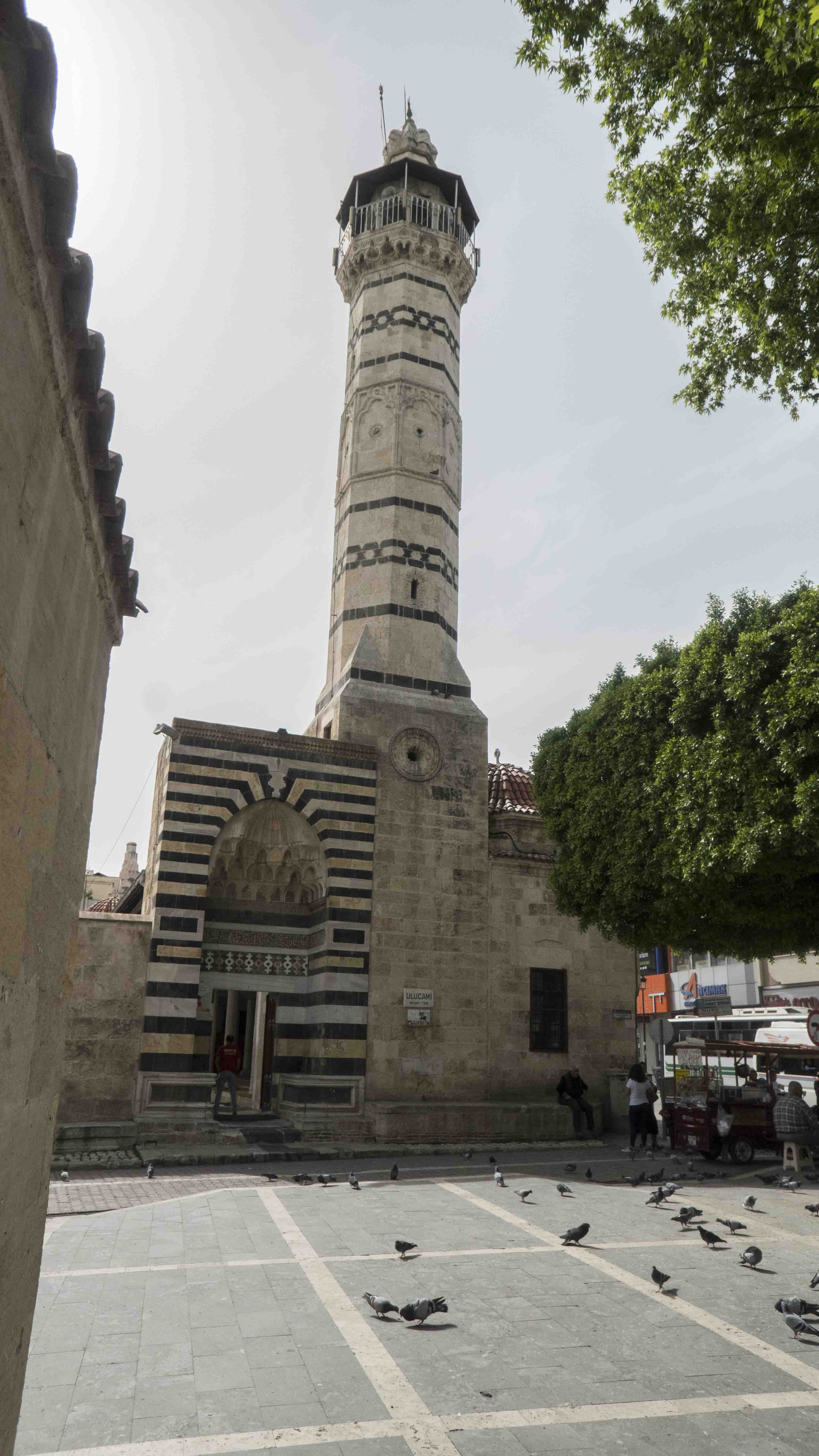
- Aerial view over Adana and the Seyhan River Adana Clock Tower Stone Bridge Merkez Park Great Mosque of Adana

- Emblem of Adana Metropolitan Municipality

- Location of Adana Adana (Asia) Adana (Earth)
- Coordinates: 37°0′N 35°19.28′E
- Country: Turkey
- Region: Mediterranean
- Province: Adana
- Founded: 6000 BC (8026 years ago)
- Incorporated: 1871 (155 years ago)
- Districts: Seyhan, Karaisalı, Yüreğir, Çukurova, Sarıçam

Government
  - Type: Mayor-council government
  - Body: Adana Metropolitan Municipality
  - Mayor: Güngör Geçer (acting) (CHP)

Area
  - Metro: 2,280 km^{2} (880 sq mi)
- Elevation: 23 m (75 ft)

Population (end of 2024)
  - City: 2,280,484 (province)
  - Metro: 1,816,750
  - Metro density: 797/km^{2} (2,060/sq mi)
- Demonym: Adanalı (Turkish)
- Time zone: UTC+3 (TRT)
- Postal code: 01xxx
- Area code: 0322
- Licence plate: 01
- Website: www.adana.bel.tr

Adana (Note: Turkish pronunciation: [aˈda.na]) is a large city in southern Turkey. The city is situated on the Seyhan River, 35 km (22 mi) inland from the northeastern shores of the Mediterranean Sea. It is the administrative seat of the Adana province, and has a metro population of 1,816,750 (Seyhan, Yuregir, Cukurova, Saricam).

Adana lies in the heart of Cilicia, a region of around 6 million people. The region was particularly important in the classical world due to its location by a pass in the Taurus Mountains (both for military campaigns and trade routes), and its wealth in metal and agricultural assets, including the large fertile plain of Çukurova.

Adana remains a centre for regional trade, and public and private services. Agriculture, healthcare and logistics are important parts of the economy. The city is connected to Tarsus and Mersin by TCDD train. The closest public airport is Çukurova International Airport.

== Etymology ==
The name Adana (Turkish pronunciation: [aˈda.na]; Armenian: Ատանա; Greek: Άδανα) has been used for over four millennia.

One theory holds that the city name originates from an Indo-European expression a danu 'on the river', using the same Proto-Indo-European root as the Danube, Don, Dnieper and Donets.

Greco-Roman legend suggests that the name of Adana originates from Adanus, the son of the Greek god Uranus, who founded the city next to the river with his brother Sarus, whose name was given to the river.

It is also sometimes suggested that the name is related to the Danaoi, the name for Greeks of the Trojan War in Homer and Thucydides.

According to Ali Cevad's Memalik-i Osmaniye Coğrafya Lügat (Ottoman Geographical Dictionary), the Muslims of Adana attributed the city's name to Ebu Süleym Ezene, who was appointed as Wāli by Abbasid Caliph Harun al-Rashid.

== History ==
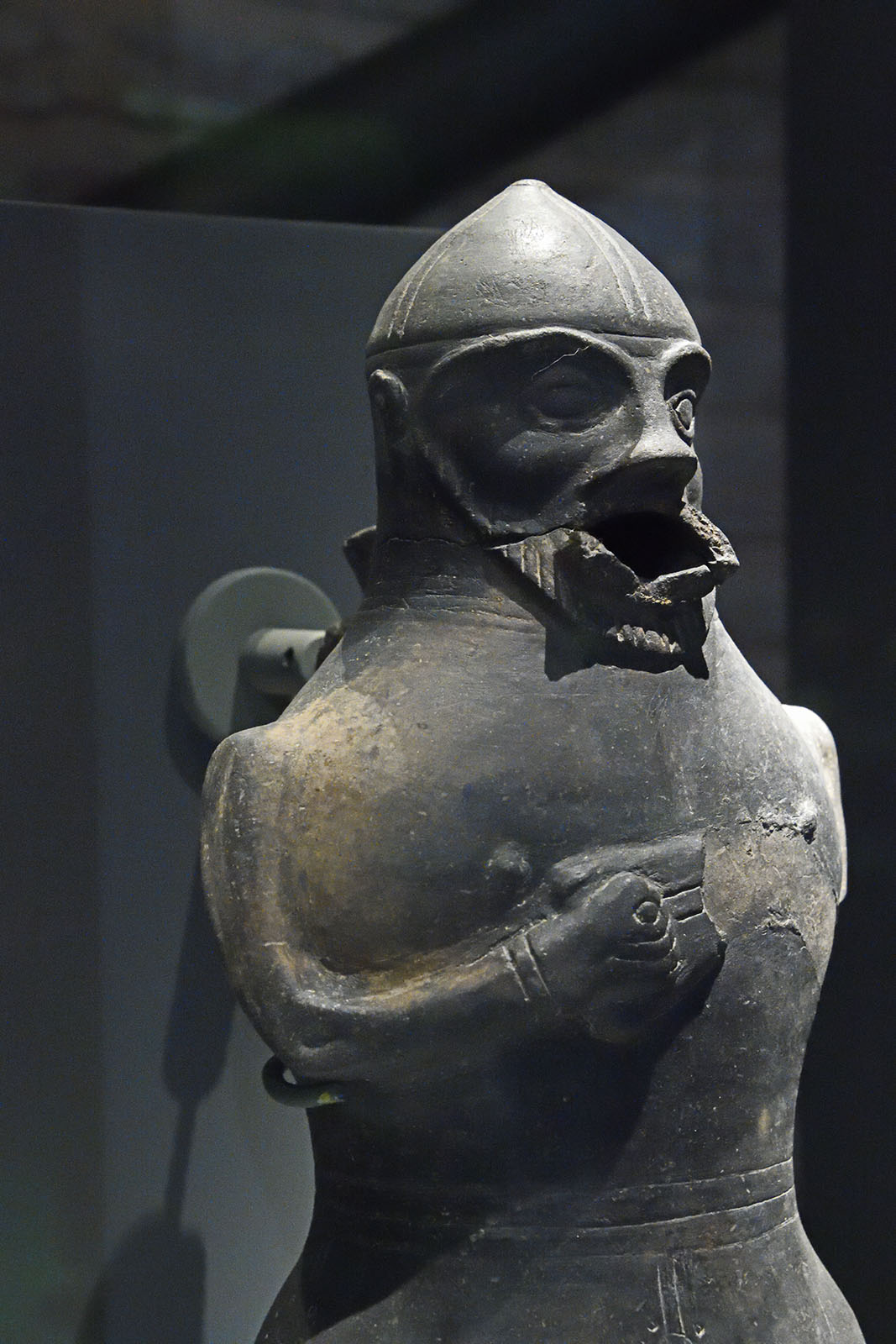
Hittite warrior in Adana Archaeological Museum

=== Bronze Age ===
Inhabited by Luwians and Hurrians, Kizzuwatna had an autonomous governance under Hittite protection, but they had a brief period of independence from the 1500s to 1420s BC. According to the Hittite inscription of Kava, found in Hattusa (Boğazkale), Kizzuwatna was ruling Adana, under the protection of the Hittites, by 1335 BC. With the collapse of the Hittite Empire around 1191–1189 BC, native Denyen sea peoples took control of Adana and the plain until around 900 BC.

=== Iron Age ===
Then Neo-Hittite states were founded in the region with the Quwê state centred on Adana. Quwê and other states were protected by the Neo-Assyrian Empire, though they had periods of independence too. After the Greek migration into Cilicia in the 8th century BC, the region was unified under the rule of the Mopsos dynasty and Adana was established as the capital. Bilingual inscriptions of the ninth and eighth centuries found in Mopsuestia (modern Yakapınar) were written in hieroglyphic Luwian and Phoenician. The Assyrians took control of the regions several times before their collapse in 612 BC.

Kingdom of Cilicia

Cilicians founded the Kingdom of Cilicia in 612 BC with the help of Syennesis I. The kingdom was independent until the invasion of the Achaemenid Empire in 549 BC, then became an autonomous satrapy of the Achaemenids until 401 BC. The uncertain loyalty of Syennessis during the rebellion of Cyrus the Younger led Artaxerxes II to abolish the Syennesis administration and replace it with a centrally appointed satrap. Archaeological remains of a procession reveal the existence of Persian nobility in Adana.

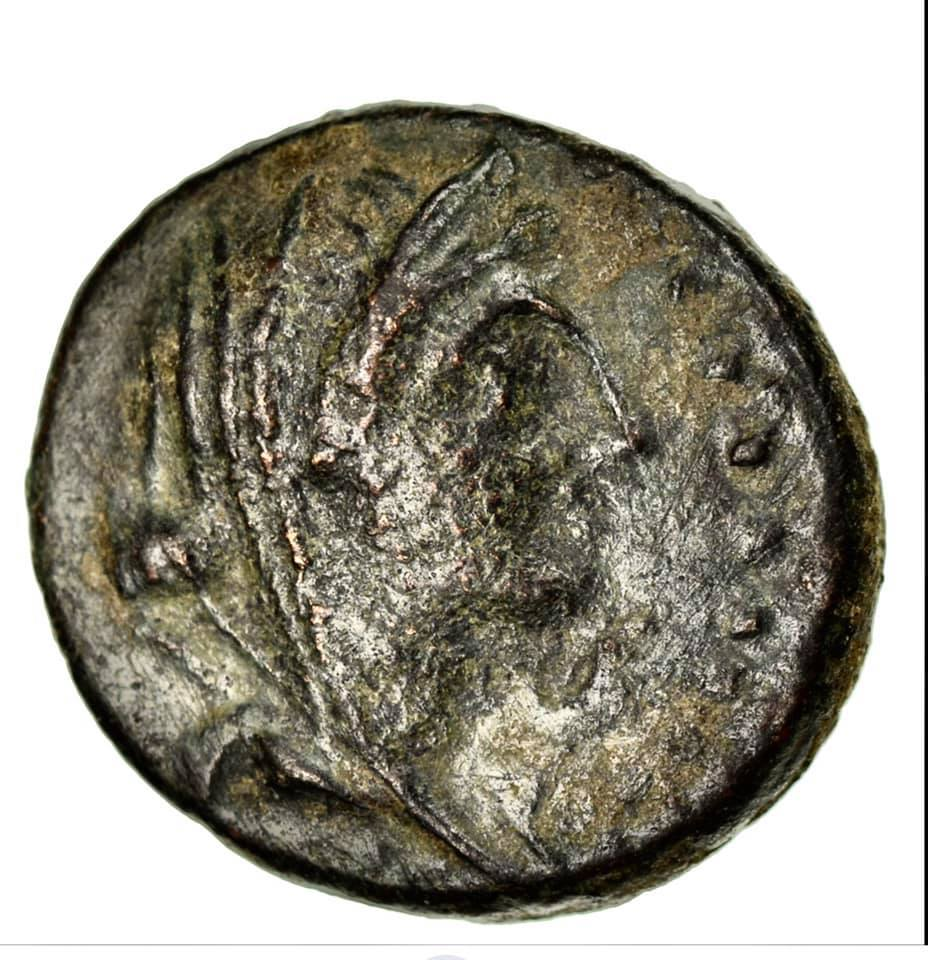
Minted coin of Adana, c. 250 BC

Alexander the Great entered Cilicia through the Cilician Gates in 333 BC. After defeating the Persians at the Battle of Issus, he installed his own satrap, Balacrus, to oversee the region's administration. His death in 323 BC marked the beginning of the Hellenistic era, as Greek replaced Luwian as the language of the region. After a short time under Ptolemaic dominion, the Seleucid Empire took control of the region in 312 BC. Adanan locals adopted a Greek name - Antioch on Sarus - for the city to demonstrate their loyalty to the Seleucid dynasty. The adopted name and the motifs illustrating the personification of the city seated above the river-god Sarus on the city's coins, suggest a special appreciation of the rivers which were a strong part of the Cilician identity. The Seleucids ruled Adana for more than two centuries until they were weakened by a civil war which led them to offer allegiance to Tigranes II, the King of Armenia who conquered a vast part of the Levant. Cilicia became a vassal state of the Kingdom of Armenia in 83 BC and new settlements were founded by Armenians in the region.

=== Romano-Byzantine era ===
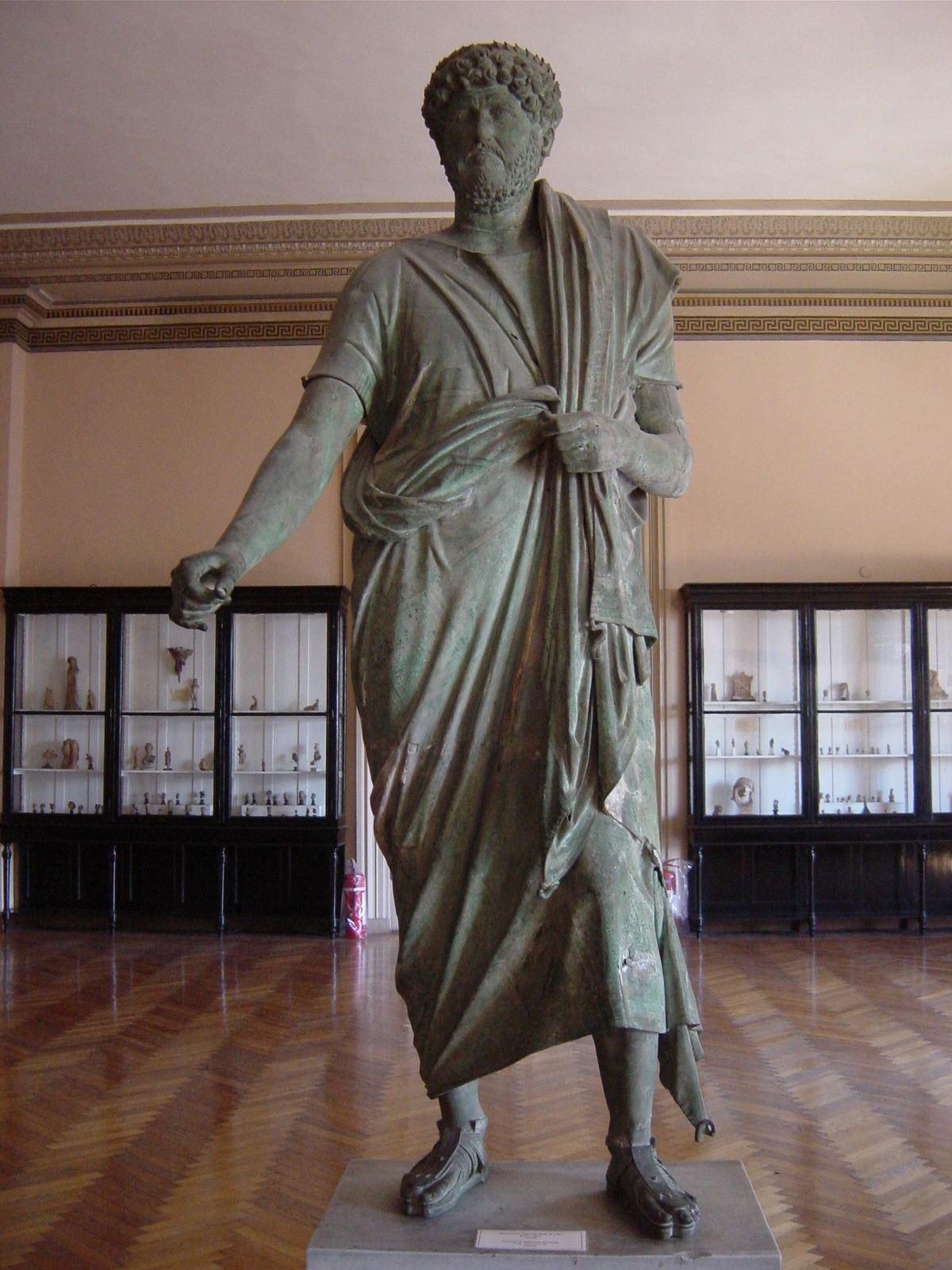
Emperor Hadrian, 2nd century AD

In the early period of Roman rule, Zoroastrianism, that had been introduced to the region by the Persians, was still observed in Cilicia as was Judaism which attracted many sympathisers. As home to some of the earliest Christian missionary efforts, Cilicia welcomed Christianity more easily than some other provinces.

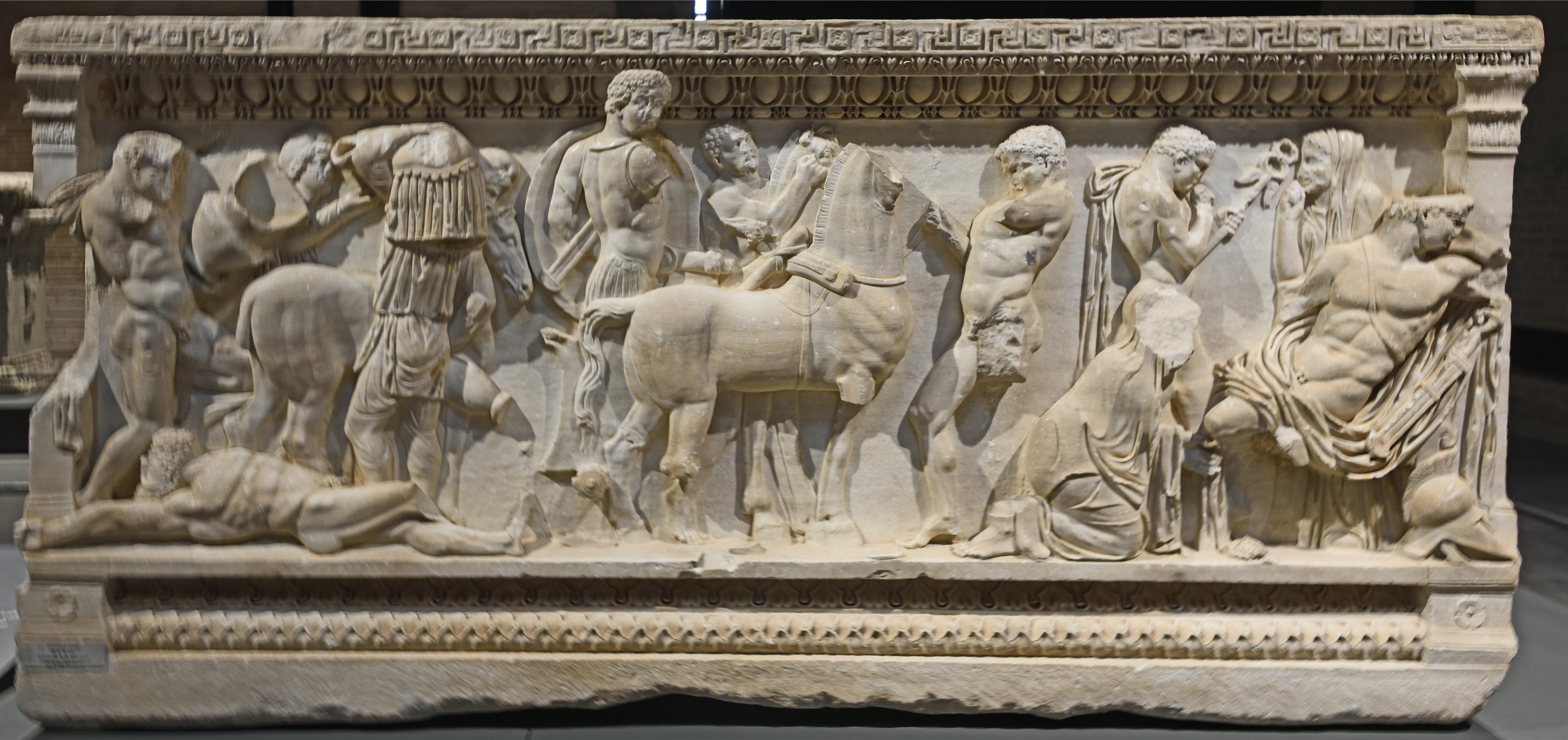
Achilles' Sarcophagus 170–190 AD

Adana became a Christian bishopric, a suffragan of the metropolitan see of Tarsus, but was raised to the rank of an autocephalous archdiocese after 680, the year in which its bishop appeared as a simple bishop at the Third Council of Constantinople, but before its listing in a 10th-century Notitiae Episcopatuum as an archdiocese. The Bishop Paulinus participated in the First Council of Nicaea in 325. Piso was among the Arianism-inclined bishops at the Council of Sardica (344) who withdrew and set up their own council at Philippopolis; he later returned to orthodoxy and signed the profession of Nicene faith at a synod in Antioch in 363. Cyriacus was at the First Council of Constantinople in 381. Anatolius is mentioned in a letter of Saint John Chrysostom. Cyrillus was at the Council of Ephesus in 431 and at a synod in Tarsus in 434. Philippus took part in the Council of Chalcedon in 451 and was a signatory of the joint letter of the bishops of Cilicia Prima to Byzantine Emperor Leo I the Thracian in 458 protesting at the murder of Proterius of Alexandria. Ioannes participated in the Third Council of Constantinople in 680. No longer a residential bishopric, Adana is today listed by the Catholic Church as a titular see.

=== Period of Byzantine and Islamic rivalry ===
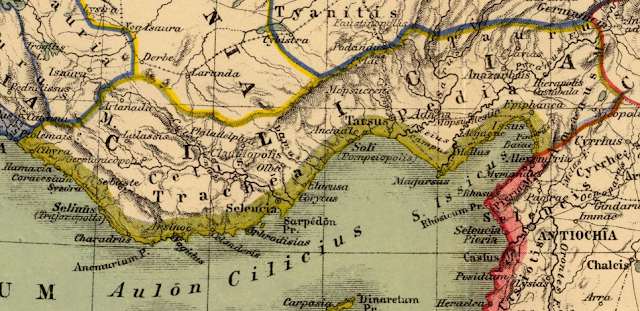
Provincia Cilicia

At the Battle of Sarus in April 625, Heraclius defeated the forces of Shahrbaraz of the Sasanian Empire that were stationed on the east bank of the river, after a fearless charge across the bridge built by the Emperor Justinian (now Taşköprü). During the reign of Caliph Omar, Muslims who are commanded by Khalid ibn Walid, launched columns to raid Cilicia, going as far as Tarsus, in the autumn of 638. The Byzantines defended the region from the encroaching Islamic Caliphates throughout the 7th century, but it was finally conquered in 704 by the Umayyad Caliph Abd al-Malik. Under Umayyad rule, Cilicia became a no man's land frontier between Byzantine Christian and Arab Muslim forces.

Abandoned for more than fifty years, Adana was garrisoned and re-settled from 758 to 760. So that it could form a thughūr on the Byzantine frontier, Cilicia was colonised by the Turkic Sayābija tribe from Khorasan. The city saw rapid economic and cultural growth during the reigns of Harun al-Rashid and Al-Amin. Abbasid rule continued for more than two centuries.

=== Armenian Kingdom of Cilicia ===
Suleiman ibn Qutulmish, the founder of the Anatolian Seljuk Sultanate, annexed Adana in his campaign in 1084. During the Crusades, Cilicia had been criss-crossed by invading armies until it was eventually captured by the forces of the Armenian Principality of Cilicia in 1132, under its king, Leo I. It was retaken by Byzantine forces in 1137, but the Armenians regained it again in around 1170. During the Armenian era, Adana continued as a centre for handicrafts and international trade as part of an ancient network from Asia Minor to North Africa, the Near East and India. Venetian and Genoese merchants frequented the city to sell goods imported through the port at Ayas.

=== Ramadanid Emirate ===
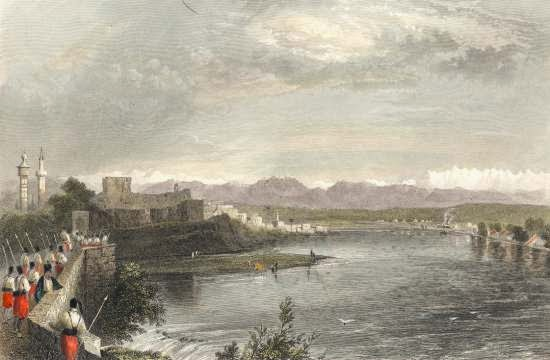
Forces of Muhammad Ali of Egypt entering the city. Adana Castle and the city walls seen at back were demolished by them in 1836.

The Mamluks built garrisons in Tarsus, Ayas and Sarvandikar (Savranda), and left the administration of the plain of Adana to Yüreğir Turks who had already formed a Mamluk authorised Türkmen Emirate in the Camili area, just southeast of Adana, in 1352. The Emir, Ramazan Bey, designated Adana his capital, and led the Yüreğir Turks as they settled the city. The Ramadanid Emirate, was de facto independent throughout the 15th century as a result of being a thughūr in Ottoman-Mamluk relations. In 1517, Selim I incorporated the emirate into the Ottoman Empire after his conquest of the Mamluk state. The Ramadanid Beys held onto the administration of the new Ottoman Sanjak of Adana by a hereditary title until 1608.

=== Ottoman and Egyptian eras ===
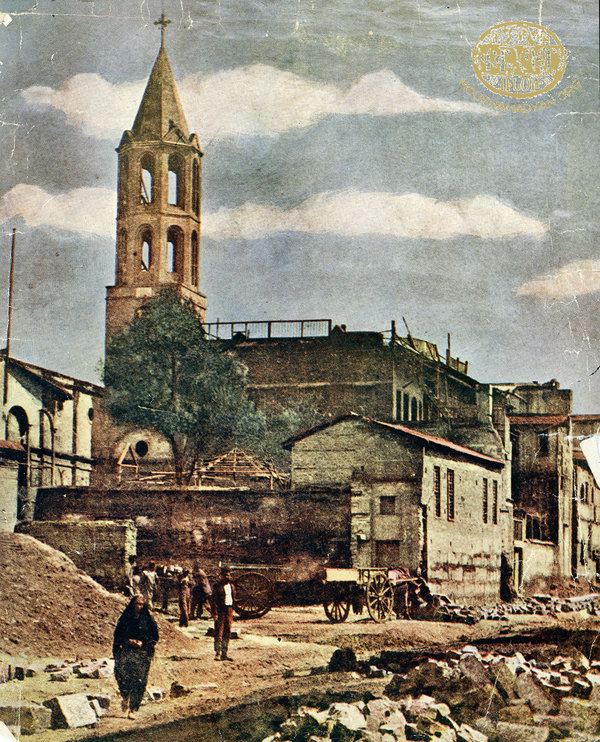
Surp Asdvadzadzin Cathedral (demolished in 1970s)

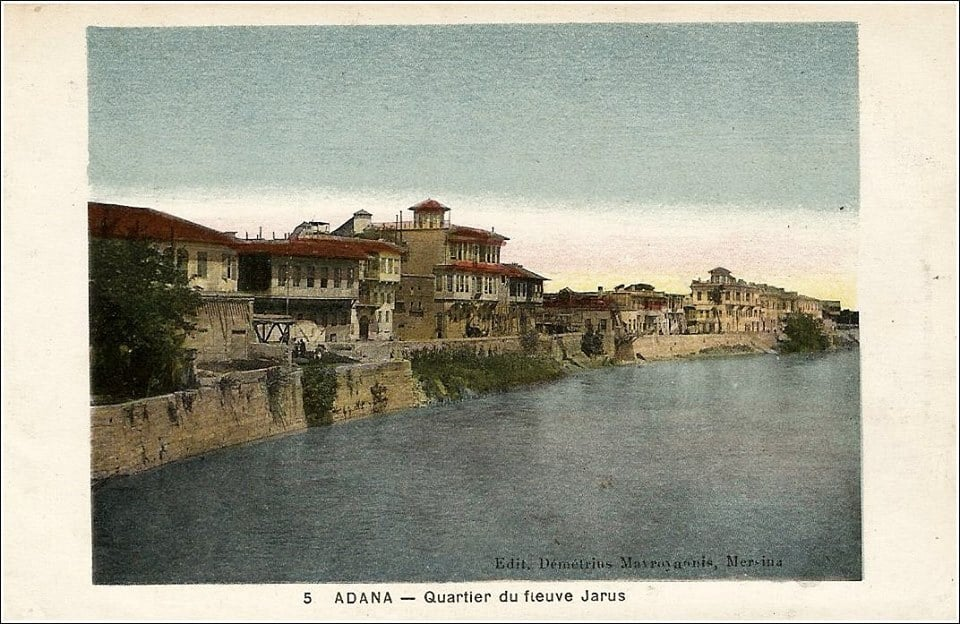
Riverside quarter

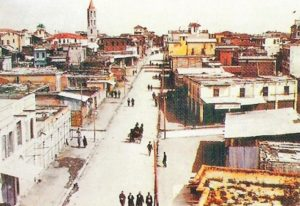
Armenian quarter

The Ottomans terminated the Ramadanid administration in 1608 after the Celali rebellions and began direct rule from Constantinople through an appointed Vali. In late 1832, the Vali of Egypt, Muhammad Ali Pasha, invaded Syria, and reached Cilicia. The Convention of Kütahya signed on 14 May 1833 ceded Cilicia to the de facto independent Egypt. At that time, the Sanjak of Adana's population of 68,934 had hardly any urban services. The first neighbourhood (Verâ-yı Cisr) east of the river was founded and Alawites were brought from Syria to work in the flourishing agricultural lands. İbrahim Paşa, the son of Muhammad Ali Paşa, demolished Adana Castle and the city walls in 1836. He built the first canals for irrigation and transportation and also built a water system for the residential areas of the town, including wheels that raised the water of the river for public fountains. After the Oriental crisis, the Convention of Alexandria signed on 27 November 1840 required the return of Cilicia to Ottoman sovereignty.

By the turn of the 20th century, further migration attracted by large-scale industrialisation grew Adana's population to over 107,000: That population was made up of 62,250 Muslims (Turks, Alawites, Circassians, Kurds), 30,000 Armenians, 9,250 Assyrians (many of whom were Chaldean Catholics), 5,000 Greeks, 500 Arab Christians and 200 internationals.

==== Adana massacre of 1909 ====
Quarters that were burnt during the massacre of 1909

In the early 20th century the local economy thrived and the Armenian population doubled as people fled the Hamidian massacres. When the revolution of July 1908 brought about the end of Abdul Hamid II's autocratic rule, the Armenian community felt empowered to imagine an autonomous Cilicia. The CUP's post-revolution mismanagement of the vilayets caused the pro-diversity Vali Bahri Pasha to be removed from office in late 1908. He was replaced by the weak Cevad Bey. Taking advantage of this, Bağdadizade Abdülkadir (later Paksoy), the local leader of the Cemiyet-i Muhammediye, took almost complete control of the local government and led an action plan to "punish" Armenians throughout Cilicia. Rumours of an upcoming Armenian attack, raised tension in the Turkish neighbourhoods. As soon as news of the countercoup reached Cilicia, enraged members of the Cemiyet-i Muhammediye.

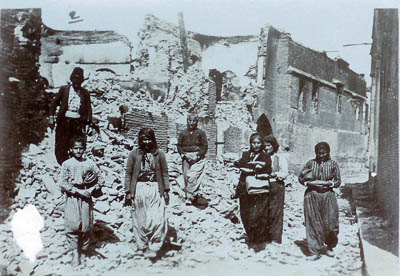
Survivors of the massacre amid ruins of their houses

After a week of silence, 850 soldiers from regiments of the Ottoman Army arrived in the city on April 25. Shots were fired at the campground and a rumour immediately spread that the Armenians had opened fire from a church tower. Without even investigating the rumour, the military commander Mustafa Remzi Pasha directed soldiers and bashi-bazouks towards the Armenian quarters and for three days they shot people, destroyed buildings and burned down Christian neighbourhoods. The pogroms of 25–27 April were on a much greater scale than the clashes of 14–17 April, and almost all the casualties were Christian.

The Adana massacre of April 1909 resulted in the deaths of 18,839 Armenians, 1,250 Greeks, 1,272 Assyrians and 620 Muslims. Adding in the roughly 2,500 Hadjinian and other seasonal workers who disappeared, the death toll in the entire Vilayet is estimated to have been around 25,500. Over the summer 2,000 children died of dysentery and a few thousand adults died of injuries or from epidemics. The massacre orphaned 3,500 children and caused heavy destruction of Christian properties. Cevad Bey and Mustafa Remzi Pasha were sacked and given light sentences for abuse of power, and on 8 August 1909, Djemal Pasha was appointed the new Vali. He quickly rebuilt relations with the surviving Armenian community and gathered financial support to found a new neighbourhood for Armenians called Çarçabuk (now Döşeme). He also ordered the construction of two orphanages and the restoration of destroyed buildings.

==== Armenian genocide ====
Early in May 1915, Vali Ismail Hakkı Bey received an order from Constantinople (now İstanbul) to deport the Armenians of Adana. The Vali was able to delay the deportations and let the Armenians sell their movable assets to acquire money for the journey. The first convoy of deportees consisting of more than 4,000 Armenians left the city on May 20. The Catholicos of Cilicia, Sahak II, wrote a letter to Djemal Pasha, the then Syria-Cilicia General Vali to prevent further deportations and the chief secretary Kerovpe Papazian met the pasha in Aley in Lebanon in early June and delivered the message of the Catholicos. Djemal Pasha immediately wired the Vali ordering him not to deport more Armenians. As a result of his efforts, the Adana Armenians earned a stay of execution for the summer, while the rest of the Cilician Armenians were being deported and hundreds of thousands of exhausted Armenian deportees from Western Anatolia were passing through the city. Armenian intellectuals Rupen Zartarian, Sarkis Minassian, Nazaret Daghavarian, Harutiun Jangülian, and Karekin Khajag, who were deported from Constantinople on April 24th, were kept in custody in the Vilayet offices for a few days. They failed to be able to arrange a meeting with the Catholicos at the Cathedral, their last attempt at survival. Later in June, two prominent leaders, Krikor Zohrab and Vartkes Serengülian, were also kept in the city during their final journey towards Diyarbakır.

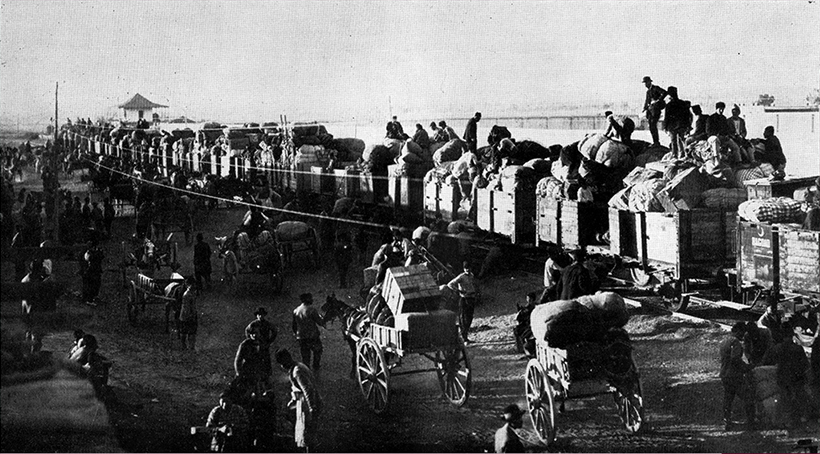
Armenians being loaded onto the trains for deportation to Syria

The Minister of the Interior, Talaat Pasha, wanted to end the exemption of Adana Armenians and sent his second in command, Ali Münif, to the city in mid-August to order the resumption of the deportations. Ali Münif immediately deported 250 families who were accused of insurrection. Before the remaining Armenians were deported, the Vali again arranged for them to sell their assets. As almost a third of the city's residents were selling their belongings, the city must have seemed like the site of a massive clearance sale. The deportation of 5,000 Armenian families in eight convoys started on 2 September 1915 and continued until the end of October. One thousand craftsmen, state officers and army personnel and their families were exempted from deportation. Unlike the deportees of other Vilayets, many of Adana's Armenians were sent to Damascus and further south, thereby avoiding the Deir ez-Zor Camps, at the request of Djemal Pasha.

=== French rule ===
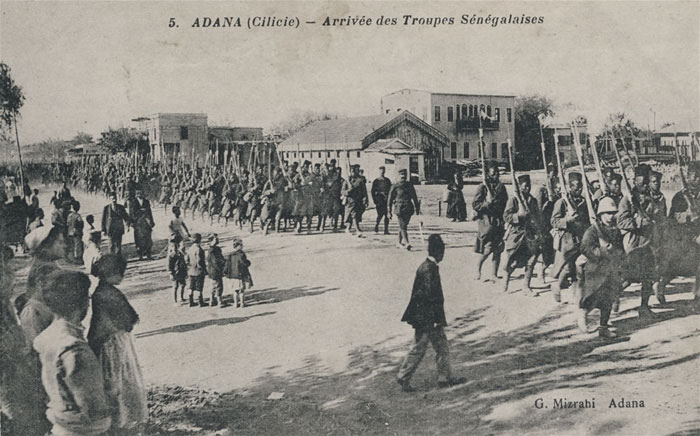
Senegalese troops arriving in Adana

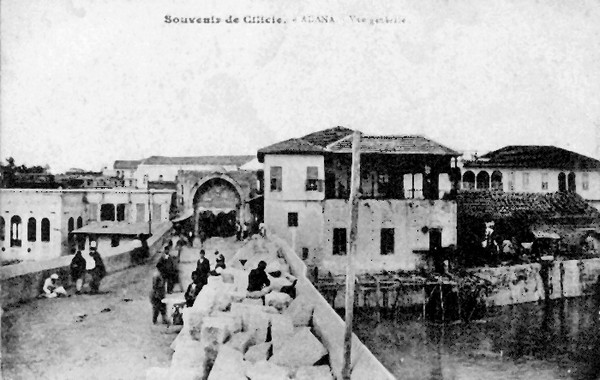
Kalekapısı – entrance to the city from Taşköprü (Stone Bridge) in 1920

Historical affiliations

Luwians c.3000–1600 BC
Hittites 1600s–1500s BC
Kizzuwatna (free) 1500s–1420s BC
Hittites 1420s–1190s BC
Denyen Sea Peoples 1190s–c.900 BC
Quwê / Assyria c.900–612 BC
Kingdom of Cilicia 612–549 BC
Achaemenid Empire 549–333 BC
Empire of Alexander 333–323 BC
Ptolemaic Kingdom 323–312 BC
Seleucid Empire 312–83 BC
Kingdom of Armenia 83–64 BC
Roman Empire 64BC–395AD
Byzantine Empire 395–704
Umayyad Caliphate 704–746
Byzantine Empire 746–756
Abbasid Caliphate 756–965
Byzantine Empire 965–1084
Seljuk / Crusades 1084–1132
Armenian Principality of Cilicia 1132–1137
Byzantine Empire 1137–1170
Armenian Kingdom of Cilicia 1170–1359
Ramadanid Emirate 1359–1608
Ottoman Empire 1608–1833
Egypt Eyalet 1833–1840
Ottoman Empire 1840–1918
French Cilicia 1918–1922
Turkey 1922–present

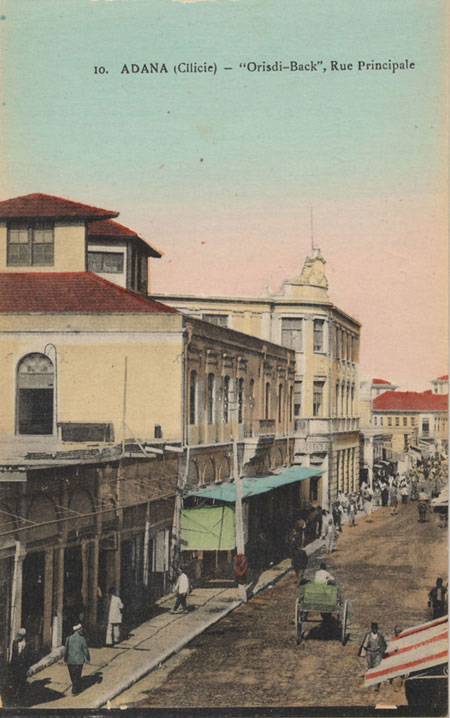
Rue Principale (now Alimünif St) in Adana's old town centre

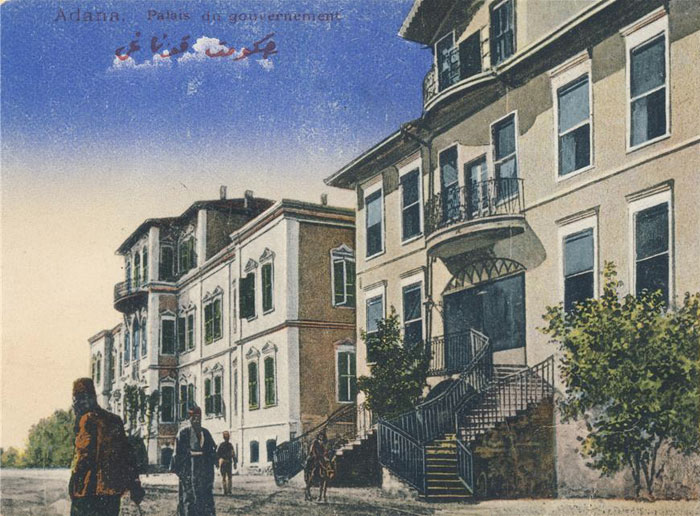
Cilicie Palais de Gouvernement (now Seyhan District Hall) in the town centre

The Armistice of Mudros, signed on 30 October 1918, ended Ottoman participation in World War I. The terms of the armistice ceded control of Cilicia to France. In December the French government sent four battalions of the Armenian Legion to take over Adana and oversee the repatriation of more than 170,000 Armenians to Cilicia. Returning Armenians negotiated with France to establish an autonomous State of Cilicia and Mihran Damadian, the chief negotiator for the Armenians, signed a provisional Constitution of Cilicia in 1919. Pre-war life resumed with the re-opening of churches, schools, cultural centres and businesses.

However, the French forces were spread thinly across Cilicia and the villages to which people returned came under attack from the Turkish Kuva-yi Milliye. The costs and difficulties associated with the repatriation process, and growing Arab nationalism within the Syria mandate forced the French High Commissioners to meet the Turkish leader, Mustafa Kemal Pasha, several times in late 1919 and early 1920, resulting in a halt to the deployment of extra forces to Cilicia. A truce arranged on 28 May 1920 between the French and the Kemalists, led the French forces to retreat south of the Mersin-Osmaniye railroad. The subsequent evacuation of thousands of Armenians from Sis and its environs and their migration to Adana raised the number of Armenians in the city to more than 100,000. On 10 July 1920, to ease the overpopulation south of the railroad, a Franco-Armenian operation forced the local Turkish population to escape north. Roughly 40,000 Turks from Adana and around fled to the countryside and to the mountains north, an event known as the Kaç Kaç incident, which lasted for four days and claimed hundreds of lives. The Turkish Cilician Society (Turkish: Kilikyalılar Cemiyeti) and Association for Defence of National Rights then met at a congress in Pozantı on 5 August 1920 to re-establish Turkish rule over Cilicia. On the same day, Mihran Damadian declared the autonomy of Cilicia by coming to an agreement with the city's Christian communities. However, the French government did not recognise its autonomy, expelled the community leaders and disbanded the Armenian Legion in September.

As the political environment changed, the French abandoned all claims to Cilicia, which they had originally hoped to attach to their mandate over Syria. On 9 March 1921, the Cilicia Peace Treaty was signed between France and the Turkish Grand National Assembly. However, it did not achieve its intended goals and was replaced by the Treaty of Ankara, signed on 20 October 1921. Under the terms of this agreement, France recognised the end of the Cilicia War and agreed to withdraw provided that the Christian communities' rights were protected. Those Armenians who were not satisfied with such guarantees rushed to Mersin port and Dörtyol, and had evacuated their homeland of two millennia by December 1921.

In 1922, up to 10,000 local Greeks moved to Greece before the policy of Greco-Turkish population exchange took effect. Among the 172,000 Armenians in the Adana area just before the Cilicia Evacuation, 80,000 took refuge in Syria or Lebanon while up 10,000 of them migrated to Cyprus, Izmir and Istanbul. The remained 82,000 or so Armenians most likely remained in the Adana area and assimilated into Turkish/Muslim society. Armenians who settled in Lebanon founded the Nor Adana (English: New Adana) neighbourhood within the mostly Armenian town of Bourj Hammoud, north-east of Beirut. From the 1920s onwards, around 60 percent of Cilician Armenians moved to Argentina. An informal census of 1941 revealed that 70 percent of all the Armenian Argentines in Buenos Aires had Adana origins.

=== Modern Turkey ===
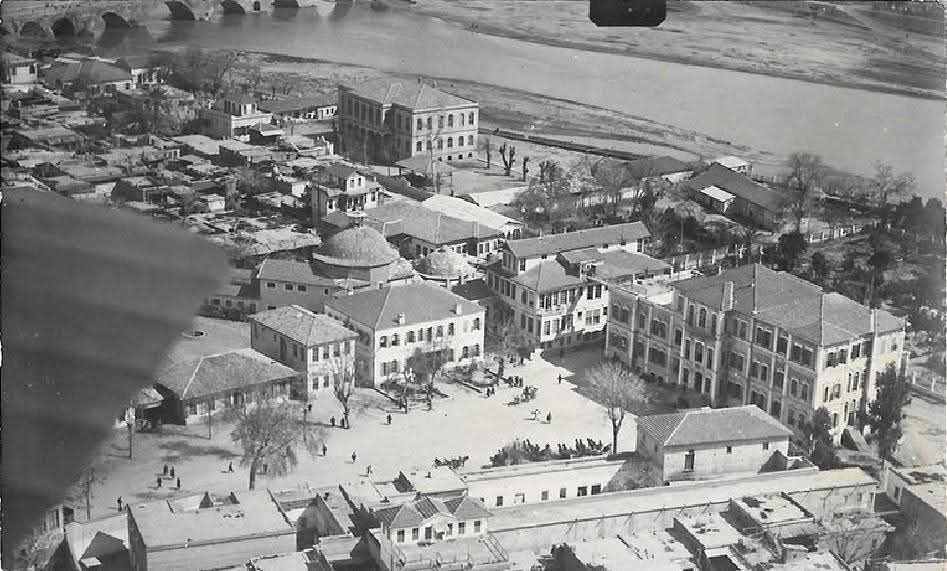
Hükümet Square in 1940s

On 15 April 1923, just before the signing of the Treaty of Lausanne, the Turkish government enacted the "Law of Abandoned Properties" which confiscated the properties of Armenians and Greeks who were not present there. Adana became one of the cities with the most confiscated property, which meant that muhacirs (immigrants) from the Balkans and Crete, as well as migrants from Kayseri and Darende were resettled in the Armenian and Greek neighbourhoods, with more modest pieces of land, houses and workshops distributed to them. The large farms, factories, stores and mansions were granted to Kayseri notables (e.g. Nuh Naci Yazgan, Nuri Has, Mustafa Özgür) and to local nationalists (e.g. Sefa Özler, Ali Münif) as promised at the Sivas Congress by Mustafa Kemal (later Atatürk). Within a decade, the city experienced drastic demographic change, socially and economically, and turned into an almost entirely Muslim/Turkish city.

On 27 June 1998, the city was hit by a 6.2 magnitude earthquake which killed 145 and left 1500 people wounded and many thousand homeless in the city centre and in Ceyhan district. The economic loss was estimated at US$1 billion.

On 6 February 2023, Adana was one of the major cities in Southern Turkey affected by a 7.8 magnitude earthquake.

== Geography ==
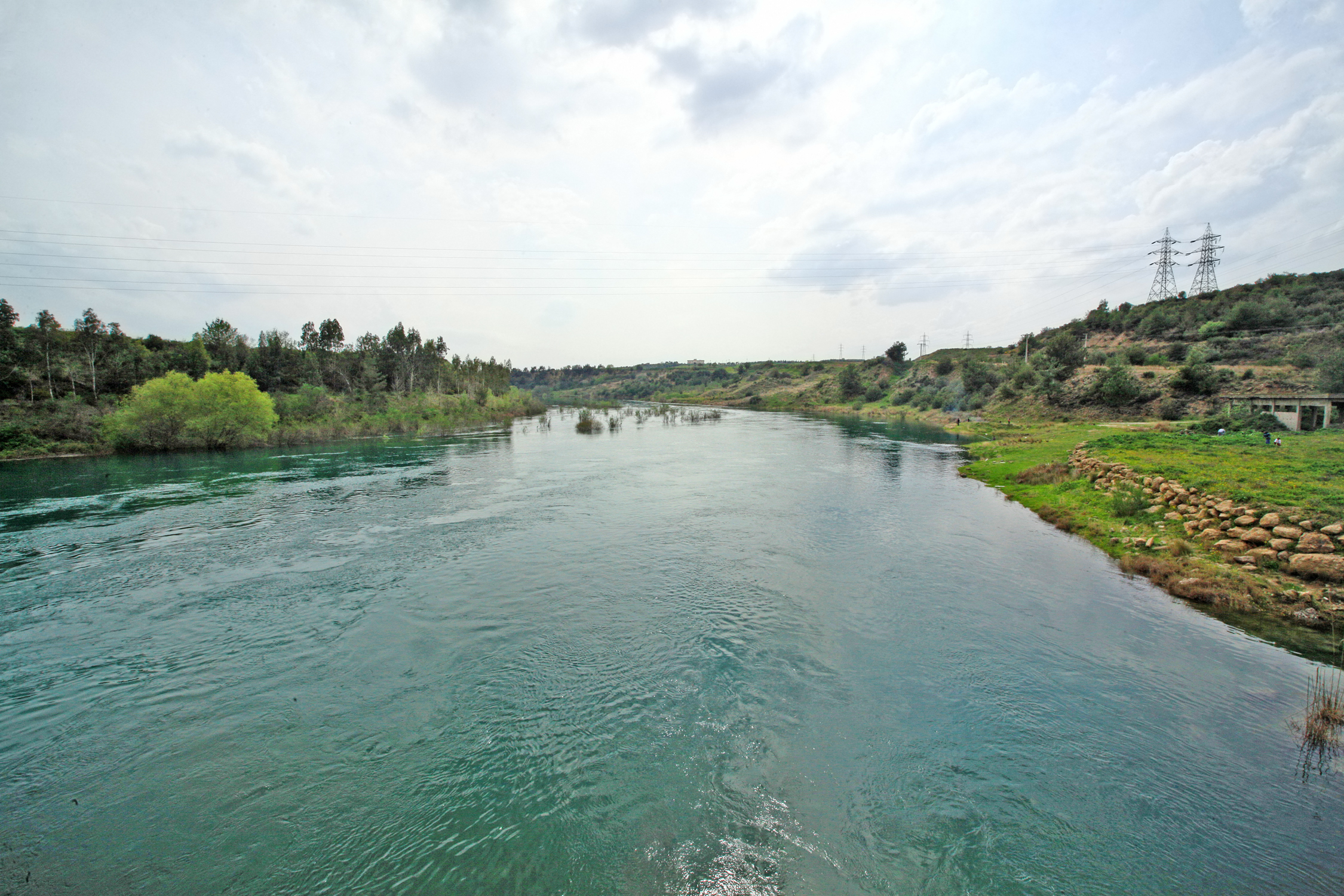
The Seyhan River in Çatalan (North of Adana)

Adana is located on the 37th parallel north on the northeastern edge of the Mediterranean, occupying the center of the Cilician plain (Turkish: Çukurova, lit. 'the Trough Plain'); a relatively large stretch of flat, fertile land that lies southeast of the Taurus Mountains.

The Seyhan (likely from Ancient Greek: Σάρος, romanized: Sáros) divides Adana into its two metropolitan districts, and is the main source for Adana's fertile alluvial soils, while also being responsible for the region's proclivity to regular winter and spring floods, which affected the city until embankments were built in the 1900s. The Seyhan Dam, completed in 1956, was constructed for hydroelectric power.

=== Climate ===
Köppen map of Adana Province and surrounding regions:
- BSk
- Csa
- Csb
- Dsa
- Dsb
- Dsc
- ET

Adana has a hot-summer Mediterranean climate (Csa) under the Köppen classification, and a dry summer subtropical climate (Cs) under the Trewartha classification. Winters are mild and wet. Frost does occasionally occur at night almost every winter, but snow is a very rare phenomenon. Summers are long, hot, humid and dry. During heatwaves, the temperature often reaches or exceeds 40 °C (104.0 °F). The highest recorded temperature was on 9 August 2025 at 46.7 °C (116.1 °F). The lowest recorded temperature was on 20 January 1964 at −8.1 °C (17.4 °F).

Climate data for Adana (1991–2020, extremes 1929-present)
Month	Jan	Feb	Mar	Apr	May	Jun	Jul	Aug	Sep	Oct	Nov	Dec	Year
Record high °C (°F)	26.5 (79.7)	28.5 (83.3)	33.3 (91.9)	37.5 (99.5)	41.3 (106.3)	43.0 (109.4)	44.4 (111.9)	46.7 (116.1)	45.1 (113.2)	41.5 (106.7)	34.3 (93.7)	30.8 (87.4)	46.7 (116.1)
Mean daily maximum °C (°F)	15.0 (59.0)	16.6 (61.9)	19.9 (67.8)	24.1 (75.4)	28.4 (83.1)	31.7 (89.1)	33.9 (93.0)	34.9 (94.8)	33.2 (91.8)	29.5 (85.1)	22.6 (72.7)	16.8 (62.2)	25.6 (78.1)
Daily mean °C (°F)	9.5 (49.1)	10.7 (51.3)	13.9 (57.0)	17.7 (63.9)	22.1 (71.8)	25.9 (78.6)	28.6 (83.5)	29.2 (84.6)	26.6 (79.9)	22.4 (72.3)	15.8 (60.4)	11.1 (52.0)	19.5 (67.1)
Mean daily minimum °C (°F)	5.6 (42.1)	6.3 (43.3)	8.9 (48.0)	12.4 (54.3)	16.6 (61.9)	20.8 (69.4)	24.3 (75.7)	24.7 (76.5)	21.4 (70.5)	16.9 (62.4)	11.0 (51.8)	7.3 (45.1)	14.7 (58.5)
Record low °C (°F)	−8.1 (17.4)	−6.6 (20.1)	−4.9 (23.2)	−1.3 (29.7)	5.6 (42.1)	9.2 (48.6)	13.2 (55.8)	14.8 (58.6)	9.3 (48.7)	3.5 (38.3)	−4.3 (24.3)	−4.4 (24.1)	−8.1 (17.4)
Average precipitation mm (inches)	111.1 (4.37)	81.9 (3.22)	59.2 (2.33)	51.2 (2.02)	48.2 (1.90)	20.3 (0.80)	12.3 (0.48)	10.4 (0.41)	25.1 (0.99)	39.7 (1.56)	78.4 (3.09)	143.0 (5.63)	680.8 (26.80)
Average precipitation days	10.00	9.63	9.13	9.00	6.83	2.77	1.20	0.83	2.87	5.43	6.77	10.03	74.5
Average relative humidity (%)	67.9	66.2	65.7	66.7	66.7	68.2	71.4	70.7	65.3	61.4	63.3	69.1	66.9
Mean monthly sunshine hours	139.5	144.1	186.0	213.0	282.1	318.0	334.8	322.4	270.0	229.4	177.0	136.4	2,752.7
Mean daily sunshine hours	4.3	5.1	5.9	6.9	8.6	9.9	10.1	9.4	8.7	7.2	5.7	4.0	7.2
Percentage possible sunshine	45	47	50	54	63	71	73	75	72	65	58	46	61
Source 1: Turkish State Meteorological Service
Source 2: NOAA (humidity, 1991-2020)

== Governance ==
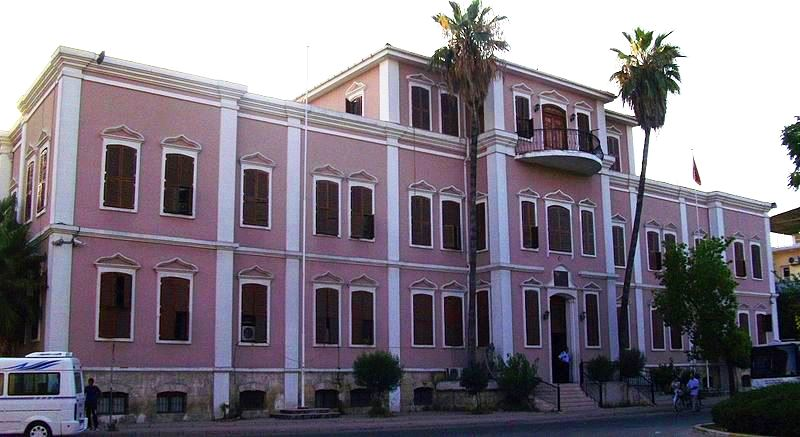
Former City Hall

Adana Metropolitan Municipality covers an area of 30 km^{2} (12 sq mi) around the City Hall. Four levels of government are involved in the administration of the city; national, provincial, metropolitan and district municipalities. The Government of Turkey in Ankara holds most of the power: health, education, the police and many other city-related services are administered by Ankara through an appointed Governor. The national government is also the lawmaker, adjudicator and auditor of all the other levels of government and the neighbourhood administration. Municipal governance is run via a two-tier structure: the Metropolitan Municipality forms the upper tier and the district municipalities form the lower tier. The Metropolitan Municipality takes care of construction and the maintenance of major roads and parks, and operates local transit and fire services.

=== Metropolitan municipality ===
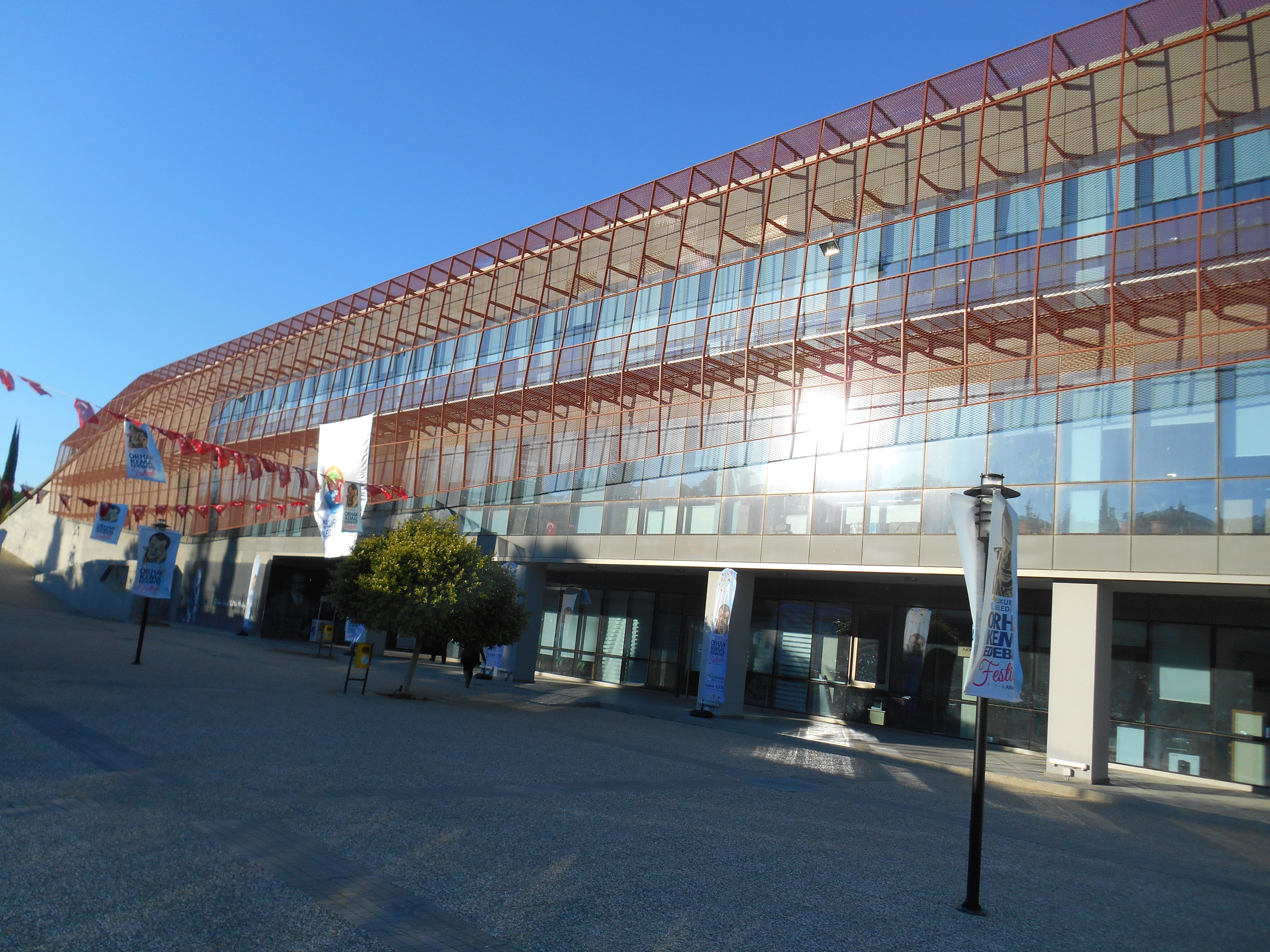
Orhan Kemal Cultural Centre belonging to Çukurova Municipality

Adana Municipality was incorporated in 1871 though the city continued to be governed under the muhtesip system until 1877 by the first mayor Gözlüklü Süleyman Efendi. Modern municipal governance began with the second mayor Kirkor Bezdikyan and his successor Sinyor Artin. Roads were widened and paved with cobblestones, drainage canals and trenches were cut, and the first municipal regulations were put into effect. After the founding of the republic in 1923, major infrastructure projects were carried out and the first planned neighbourhoods were built to the north of the city. Turhan Cemal Beriker served as mayor and governor from 1926 to 1938. With the completion of the Seyhan Dam in 1956, the city saw explosive growth and the then prime minister Adnan Menderes showed special interest in Adana, initiating large-scale infrastructure projects like citywide underground sewer systems and rezoning residential areas. Since 1984, the cityscape has seen great change with the revitalisation of the Seyhan river and the construction of large parks and boulevards.

Metropolitan Municipality Law was introduced in 1989 when municipal governance was split between the metropolitan municipality and the district municipalities. Adana Municipality became the Metropolitan Municipality and two new district municipalities - Seyhan and Yüreğir - were founded. Karaisalı was annexed to the city in 2006, while the Çukurova and Sarıçam districts were founded in 2008 by partitioning the Seyhan and Yüreğir districts. On 3 February 2012, Karataş Municipal Council agreed to amalgamate with Adana, hence Karataş has become the city's sixth district.

The Metropolitan Municipality consists of three organs: the Metropolitan Council, the Mayor and the Encümen or Executive Committee. Each district municipal council elects one-fifth of their members to represent it at the metropolitan council. Thus, the metropolitan council consists of 35 councillors, ten from Seyhan district, eight from Yüreğir, eight from Çukurova, six from Sarıçam, two from Karaisalı and the metropolitan mayor who is elected directly by the voters. The executive committee consists of ten members, five being metropolitan councillors and the other five directors at the metropolitan hall who are appointed by the metropolitan mayor.

=== Districts ===
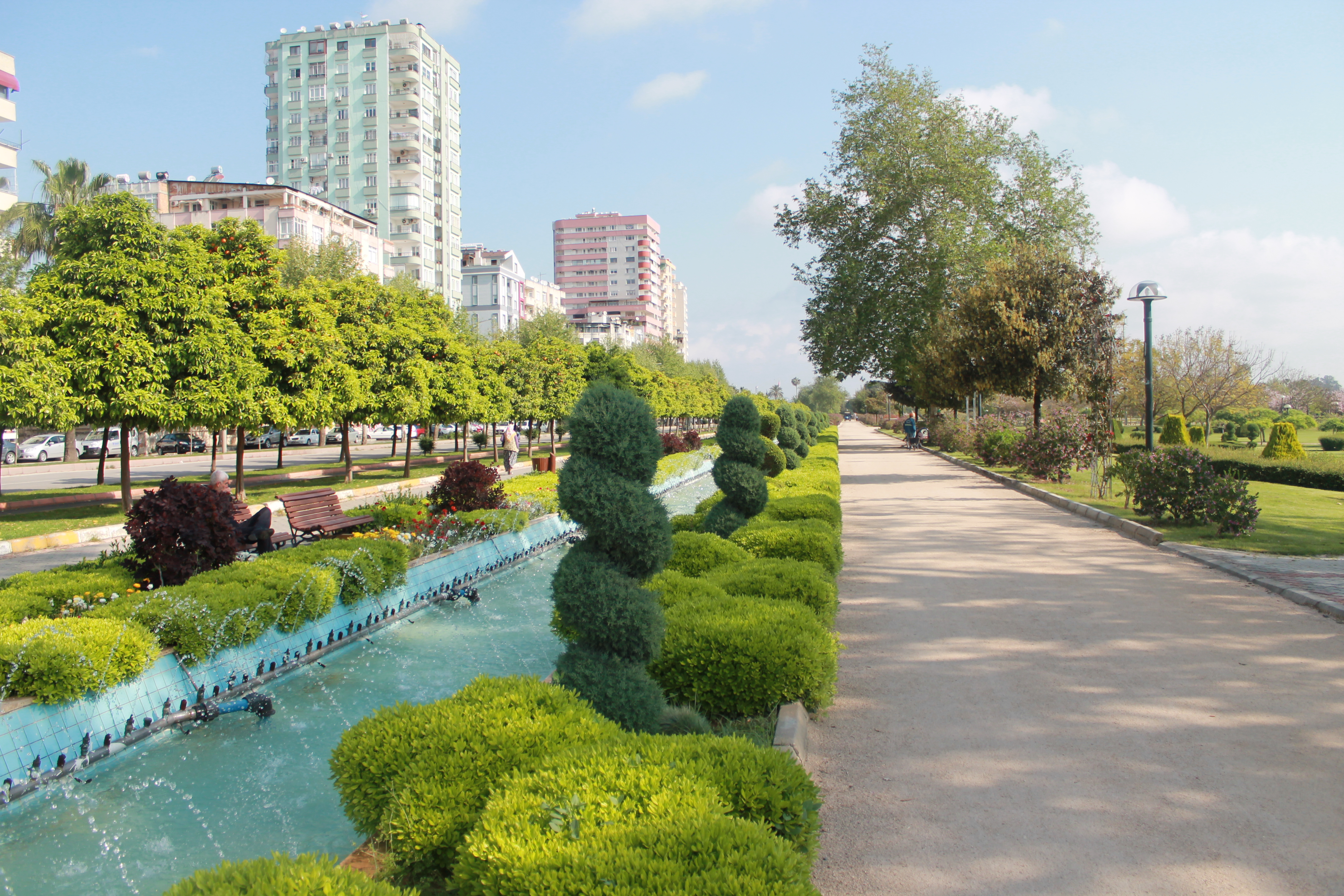
Adana park view

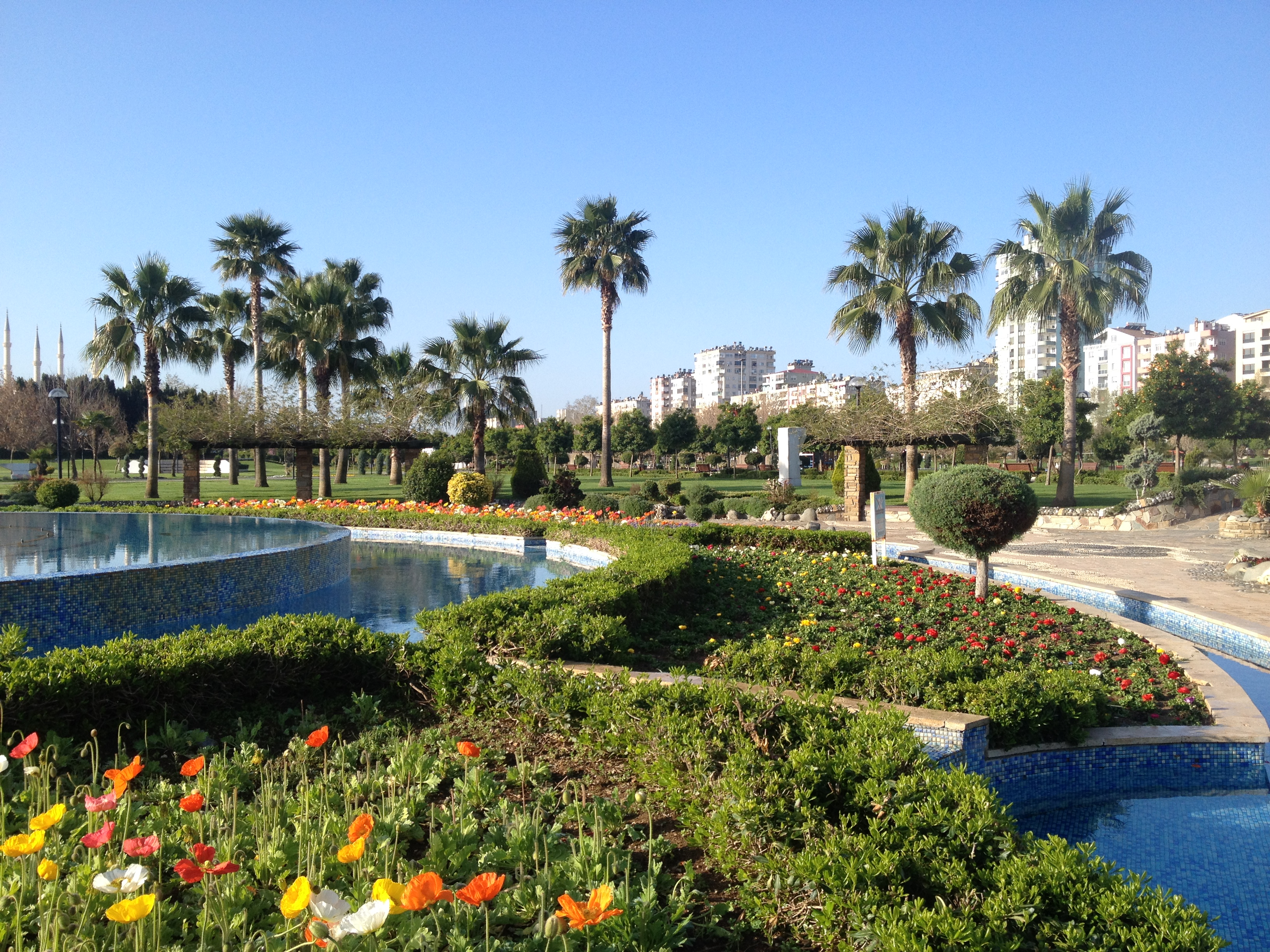
Adana park view

The City of Adana consists of the urban areas of the four metropolitan districts; Seyhan, Yüreğir, Çukurova and Sarıçam.

Çukurova district is a modern residential district that lies north of Seyhan district and south of the Seyhan Reservoir. It was planned in the mid-1980s to direct the urban sprawl towards land north of the city. Called New Adana, the project consisted of 200,000 homes including villas along the lake shore and high-rise apartment blocks along the wide, newly opened boulevards of Turgut Özal, Süleyman Demirel and Kenan Evren.

Yüreğir district, east of the river, consists mainly of large-scale industry and low-income residential areas. With the construction of new bridges over the river and the extension of the metro line, Yüreğir became increasingly important, with the Adana Court of Justice re-locating to the district and a 47.5-hectare health campus planned for the Kazım Karabekir neighbourhood. An extensive urban redevelopment plan will also convert the Sinanpaşa, Yavuzlar, Köprülü and Kışla neighbourhoods into modern residential areas.

=== Neighbourhoods ===
Individual neighbourhoods (mahalle) are administrative units within the district municipalities and are administered by the muhtar (headman) and the Neighborhood Seniors Council. Although elected by the neighbourhood residents, the muhtar is not granted any powers but functions as an administrator of the national government. The muhtar can raise neighbourhood issues with the district municipality and has a seat at the Adana City Assembly, an umbrella organisation for the coordination of public institutions in the city.

There are a total of 254 neighbourhoods in the city. Seyhan has 99 neighbourhoods, 69 of them in the original urban area and 30 in the neighbourhoods of the former municipalities and the former villages that were converted into neighbourhoods. Yüreğir has 99 neighbourhoods, 38 in the urban area and 61 in the rural. There are 29 neighbourhoods in Sarıçam, 16 neighbourhoods in Çukurova and 11 in Karaisalı district. A neighbourhood population can range from 150 to 63,000.

== Economy ==
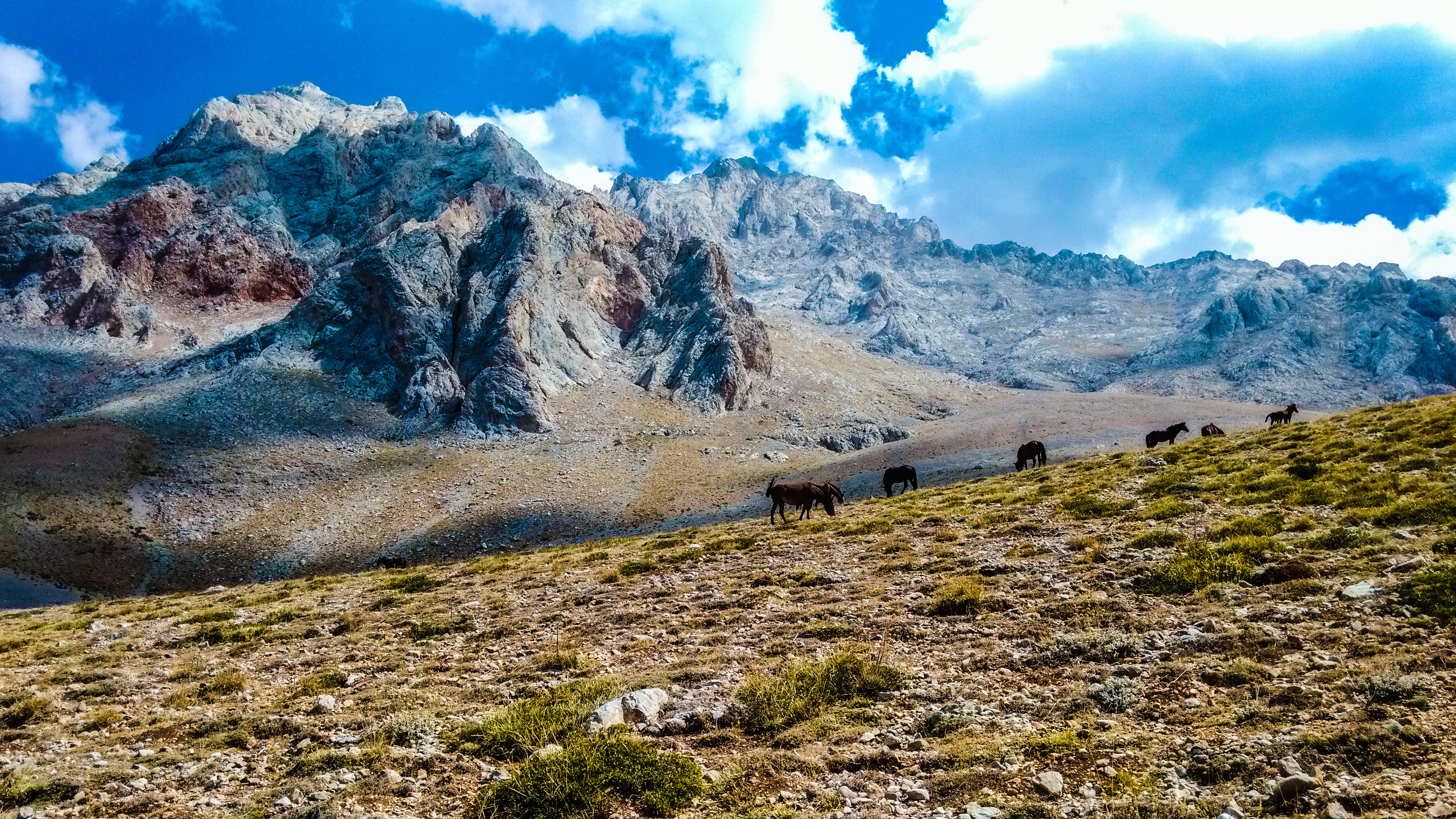
Aladağlar National Park in Adana Province is a popular tourism destination.

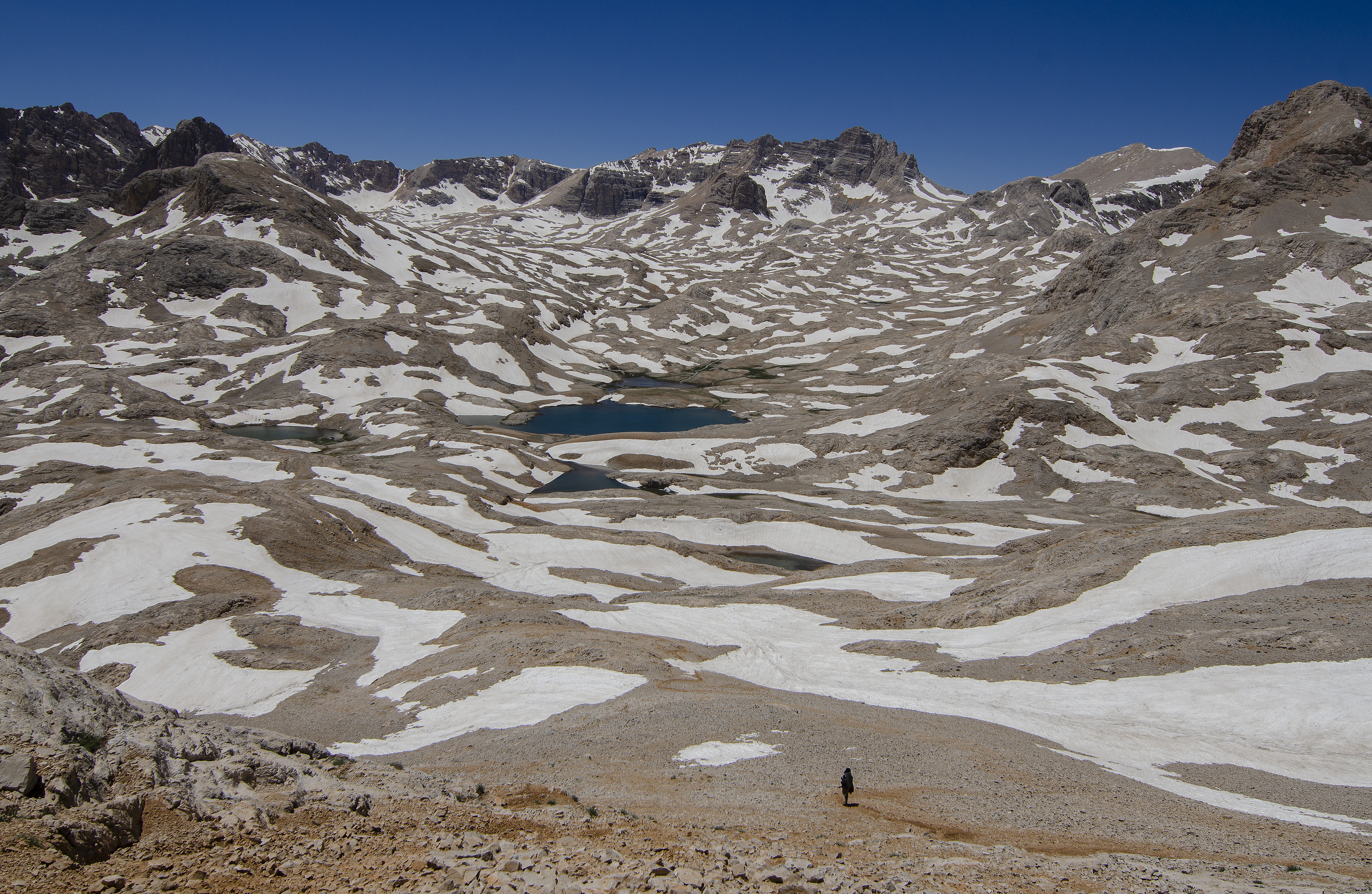
Aladağlar National Park during winter

A major centre for grain and cotton production in the Ottoman period, Adana was one of Turkey's first industrialised cities and is now one of its most economically developed cities. A mid-size trading city until the mid-1800s, the city attracted European traders after the United States, a major cotton supplier, became embroiled in its Civil War. Cilician farmers exported agricultural products for the first time and started building up capital. By the start of the 20th century, factories, almost all of them processing cotton, began to operate here. The coming of the Republic accelerated industrialisation as closed plants were re-activated and state-owned plants opened. With the construction of the Seyhan Dam and improvements in agricultural techniques, there was an explosive growth in agricultural production during the 1950s. Large-scale industry grew up along the D 400 highway and the Karataş road. A service industry, especially banking, developed during this period.

Extensive neo-liberal policies adopted by then Prime Minister Turgut Özal to centralise Turkey's economy caused almost all the Adana-based companies to move their headquarters to Istanbul. The decline in cotton planting raised the cost of raw material for manufacturing, and the city saw a wave of plant closures starting from the mid-1990s. Young professionals fled the city, contributing to Adana's unenviable status as the country's top brain drain city. Financial and human capital flight from Adana has continued to increase since 2002 due to the government's neo-liberal centralisation policies similar to Özal's. In 2010, unemployment in the city reached a record 19.1 percent.

Adana was named among the 25 European Regions of the Future for 2006/2007 by Foreign Direct Investment magazine. Chosen alongside Kocaeli, Adana scored the highest points for cost effectiveness against Kocaeli's points for infrastructure development, while the two towns tied for points in the categories of human resources and quality of life.

=== Commerce ===
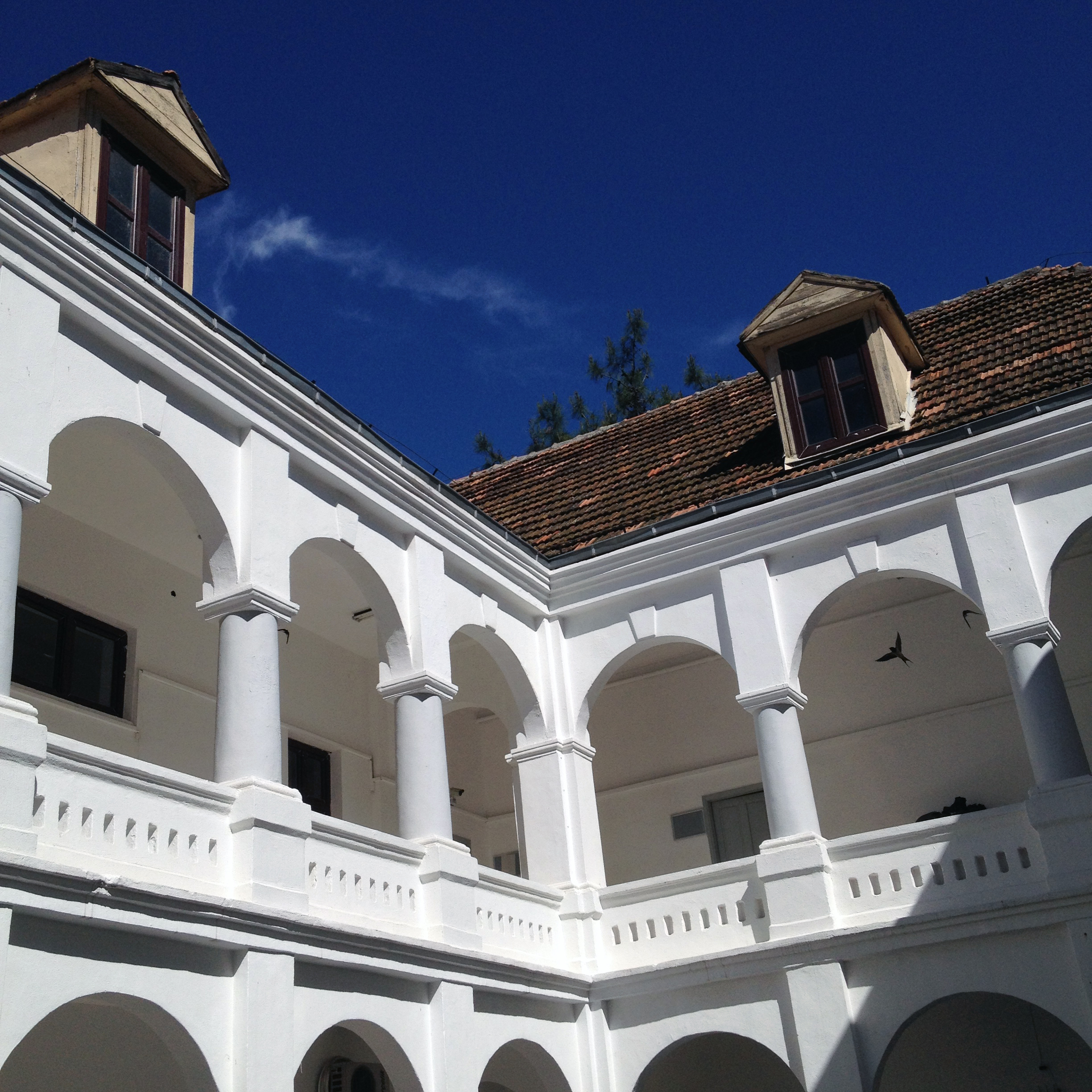
Interior view of Adana Science High School

A leading commercial centre in southern Turkey, Adana hosts the regional headquarters of many corporate and public institutions. TÜYAP Exhibition and Congress Center hosts fairs and business conferences, and is currently the main meeting point for businesses in Çukurova. The academic oriented 2000-seater Alper Akınoğlu Congress Center is expected to open in 2012 at Çukurova University campus.

The Adana Chamber of Commerce (ATO) was founded in 1894 to guide and regulate the cotton trade and it is one of the oldest of its kind in Turkey. Today the Chamber has more than 25,000 member companies, and furthers the interests of businesses and advocates on their behalf. The Adana Commodity Exchange, founded in 1913, functions mainly to organise the trade in agricultural produce and livestock. It is located opposite the Metropolitan Theatre. According to the Patent Registrar, an original Adana kebab is made only by a vendor who has successfully passed an inspection conducted on the spot by the Adana Chamber of Commerce.

The designation of the coastal areas of Ceyhan and Yumurtalık districts as Energy-specific Industrial Areas has made Adana an attraction for hotel building. Current 5-star hotels of the city, Hilton, Seyhan and Sürmeli will be complemented by Sheraton and Türkmen hotels on the river bank, Ramada and Divan hotels in the city center, Anemon hotel at the west end which are all currently under construction.

=== Agriculture ===
Adana is the marketing and distribution centre for the Çukurova agricultural region, where cotton, wheat, corn, soy bean, barley, grapes and citrus fruits are produced in great quantities. Adana's farmers produce half of Turkey's corn and soy beans. Thirty-four percent of Turkey's peanuts and 29 percent of Turkey's oranges are harvested in Adana. Most of the local farming and agricultural-based companies have their offices in Adana. Producer co-operatives play a significant role in the city's economy. Çukobirlik, Turkey's largest co-operative producer, has 36,064 members in ten provinces and does everything from planting to the marketing of cotton, peanuts, soybeans, sunflowers and canola.

The Adana Agriculture Fair is the region's largest fair attracting more than 100,000 visitors from twenty nations. It hosts agriculture, livestock, poultry and dairy businesses. A Greenhouse and Gardening Fair takes place at the same time as the Agriculture Fair which is organised on a 3.5-hectare area of the TÜYAP Exhibition Center every October.

=== Manufacturing ===
Adana's large-scale industry is mostly rooted in agriculture. Chemical production, food processing, and textile production are major industries making up 22.6, 20.2, and 14.1 percent of Adana's manufacturing, respectively. Furniture and rubber/plastic product manufacturing plants are also common. As of March 2026, Adana has sixteen companies in Turkey's top 500 industrial firms. The largest company in Adana, SASA operates one of the largest polyester production facilities in the world. SASA is Turkey's largest and a leading European polyester manufacturer with 4000 employees. Marsa Yağ in Adana has the largest single-location margarine and plant oil factory in Turkey. Another formidable company is Temsa, an automotive manufacturer that has more than 1800 employees and manufactures 4000 buses annually.

== Demographics ==
As of 31 December 2024, the total population of the four districts which composes the Adana metropolitan area was 1,816,750.

District	City Population								
	2015	2016	2017	2018	2019	2021	2022	2023	2024
Seyhan	788,722	797,563	800,387	793,480	796,286	792,536	795,012	787,771	786,931
Yüreğir	419,011	419,902	424,999	415,198	414,574	407,054	404,726	402,345	399,910
Çukurova	359,315	362,351	364,118	365,735	376,390	389,319	389,175	374,205	378,650
Sarıçam	150,425	156,748	163,833	173,154	181,610	208,227	221,783	236,298	251,259
Total	1,717,473	1,736,564	1,753,337	1,747,567	1,768,860	1,797,136	1,810,646	1,800,619	1,816,750

According to Evliya Çelebi, during the 17th century, the town was mostly composed of Turkomans but also included Arabs, Greeks, Armenians, and Jews.

An Ottoman tax register from 1526 records sixteen Turkish and one Armenian residential area. During the 17th century more Armenians and Greeks settled in the city.

Historical population

Year	Pop.	±%
1885	69,266	—
1908	107,450	+55.1%
1927	72,577	−32.5%
1955	100,367	+38.3%

Year	Pop.	±%
1980	574,515	+472.4%
2000	1,130,710	+96.8%
2024	1,816,750	+60.7%

The demographics of the city changed significantly in the 1990s after the massive migration of Kurds, many of them having been forced to leave their villages in the southeast at the peak of the Turkey–PKK conflict. The Conos, a tribe of Romani people of Romania, settled in Adana during the Balkan Wars; today they mainly live around the Sinanpaşa neighbourhood. Around 8,000 Romani people live in Adana Province. There is also a sizeable community of migrants from the Balkans and Caucasia, who settled in Adana before and during the Balkan Wars.

There were 172,000 Armenians in the Adana area in 1921, just before the Cilicia Evacuation. Around 82,000 of them were not sent into exile which explains why they remained in Adana and assimilated into Turkish society. Ten thousand to 15,000 of the descendants, who are known as Crypto-Armenians, still practise their Armenian/Christian culture behind closed doors. There are also many descendants of the Armenian children given to orphanages or to Muslim families for fostering in 1909 and 1915. Altogether, Adana may have the largest number of assimilated Armenians in contemporary Turkey. Adana is home to a community of around 2,000 British and Americans serving at NATO's Incirlik Air Base. Before 2003, the community numbered up to 22,000 but it declined after many troops were stationed in Iraq.

As with other cities on the Mediterranean and Aegean coasts, Adana has a strong secularist population. Amongst the people of faith, the majority of Turks, most of the Kurds and some of the Arabs are Sunni Muslim. Adana is also a stronghold of Alevism, many Alevis having moved to the city from Kahramanmaraş after the Maraş Massacre of 1978. Most of the Arabs of Adana are Alawites and often confused with Alevis. Alawite Arabs are known locally as Nusayri or Fellah. Adana also has a small community of Catholic Christians and a few Jewish families.

== Local attractions ==
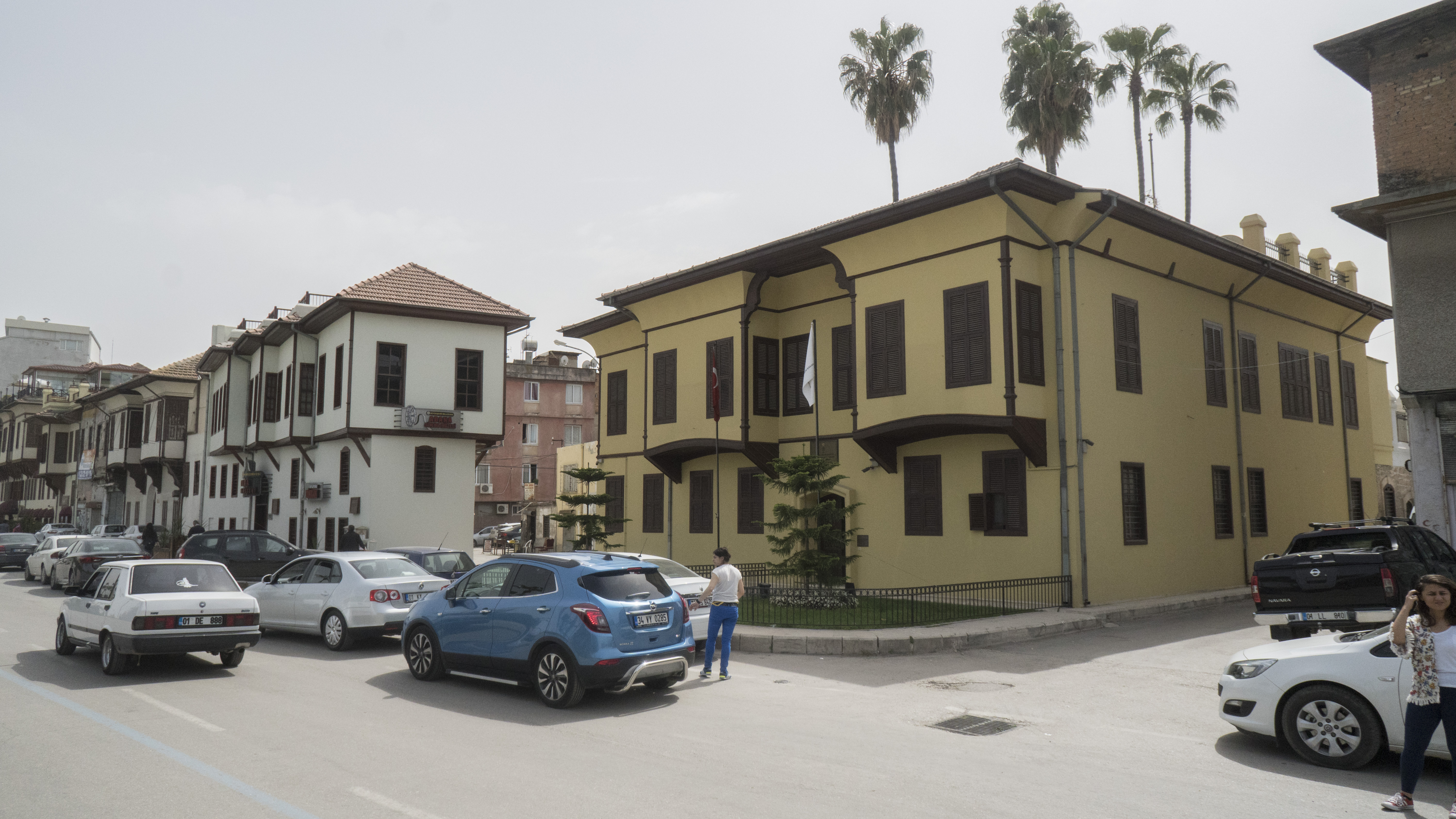
Historic rowhouses, Tepebağ

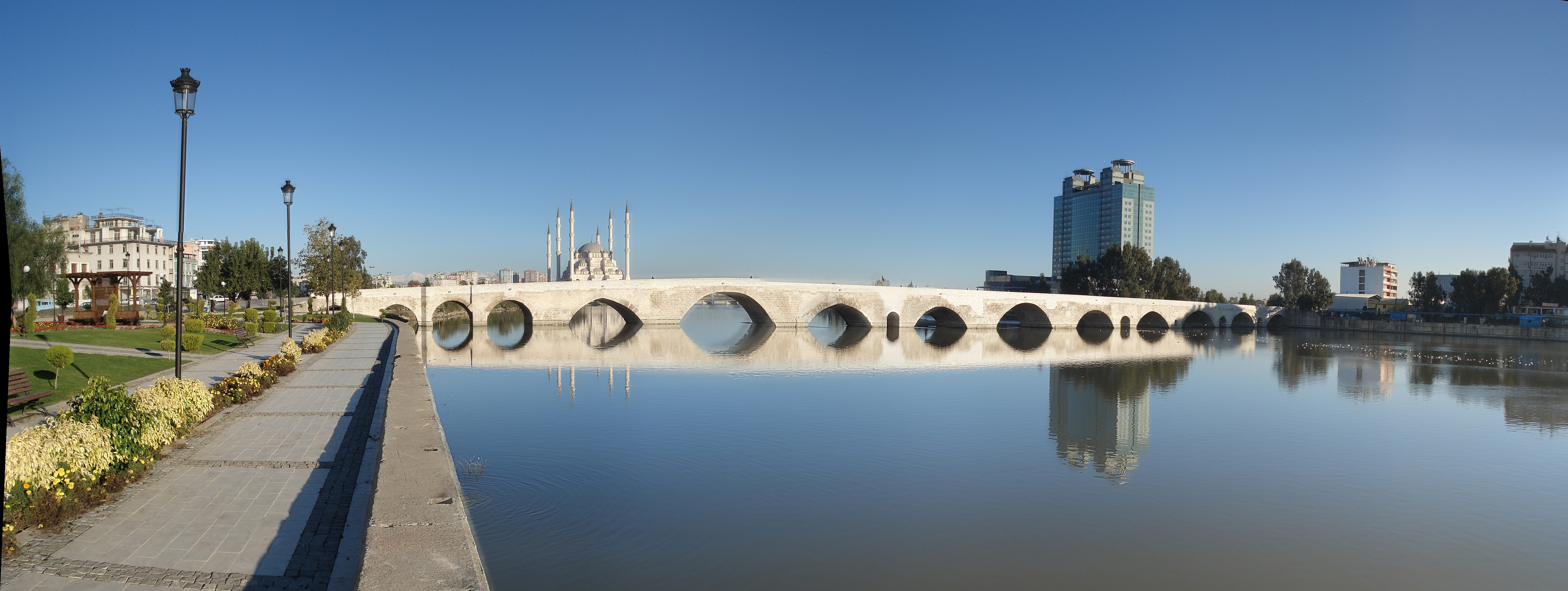
Panoramic view of Stone Bridge (Taşköprü) in Adana. Built in the Roman era, it is a prominent symbol of the city.

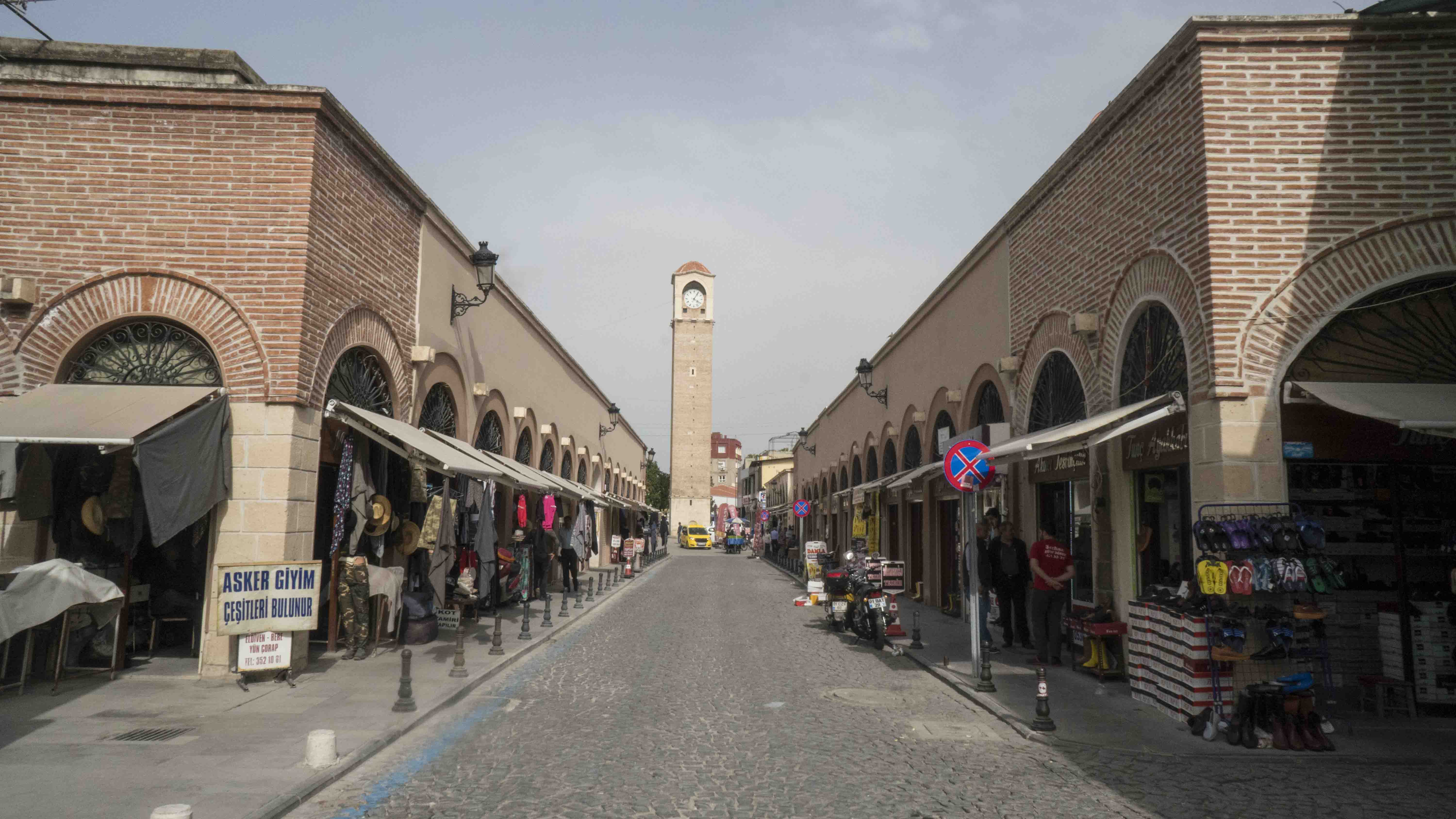
The Great Clock Tower (Büyük Saat Kulesi)

=== Mosques ===
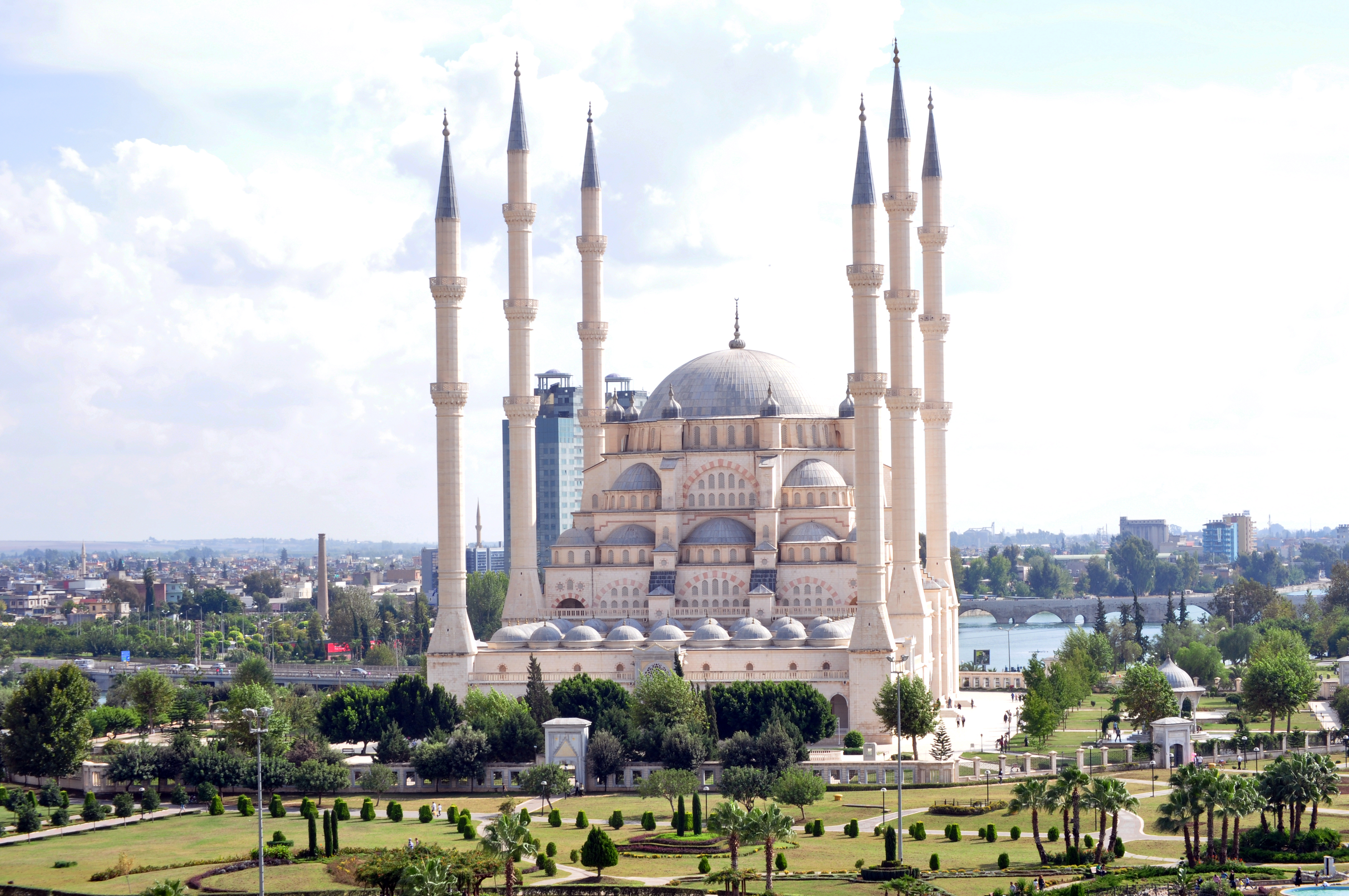
Sabancı Central Mosque (Sabancı Merkez Cami)

The Ulu Cami, a külliye built in 1541 during the Ramadanid era, is the most interesting medieval mosque to survive in Adana along with its medrese and türbe. The mosque is made from black and white marble with decorative window surrounds and is famous for the 16th century Iznik tiles lining the interior. The minaret features unique Mamluk decoration and an orthogonal floor plan.

The Yağ Camii was originally built as the Church of St. James, then converted into a mosque by Ramazanoğlu Halil Bey in 1501.

The Yeni Camii (New Mosque) was built in 1724 by Abdülrezzak Antaki, and is still known to some as the Antaki Mosque. The influence of Mamluk architecture is visible. A rectangular building, it has interesting stonework on its south walls.

The huge and prominent Sabancı Merkez Camii (Sabancı Central Mosque) on the west bank of the Seyhan river is Adana's most visited mosque and one of the largest mosques in the Middle East. Built following Ottoman architectural traditions, the mosque was opened in 1998 to accommodate up to 28,500 worshippers. It has six minarets, four of them 99 meters high. Its dome has a diameter of 32 meters and is 54 meters above the prayer hall. Near the Seyhan Bridge, the mosque is visible over a wide area.

=== Museums and art galleries ===
Adana Archaeological Museum originally opened in 1924 as one of Turkey's first ten museums. It moved to the west corner of Seyhan Bridge in 1972. The museum exhibits archeological works from all over the Çukurova. Notable exhibits include two statues of Augustus, the Achilles Sarcophagus depicting the Trojan War and statues found in the ancient cities of Magarsus and Augusta. In 2019 it moved to a completely new location in an abandoned textiles factory.

The Atatürk Museum focuses on the War of Independence and the first years of Republic in a mansion where Atatürk stayed during his trips to Adana.

Other museums, several of them in restored historic buildings, include the Karacaoğlan Museum of Literature, the Adana Museum of Cinema, the Yeşiloba Martyrs' Museum, the Mehmet Baltacı Museum of Photography and the Adana Urban Museum.

=== Bridges ===
Of the bridges crossing the Seyhan river within the city, the most notable is the Taşköprü, a 2nd-century Roman bridge.

=== Hamams (Baths) ===
The Çarşı Hamam (The bath of the Bazaar) was built in 1529 by Ramazanoğlu Piri Pasha and is Adana's largest hamam. It has five domes and the interior is faced with marble. At the time it was built, water used to be brought from the Seyhan River using a sequence of canals and water wheels.

=== Churches ===
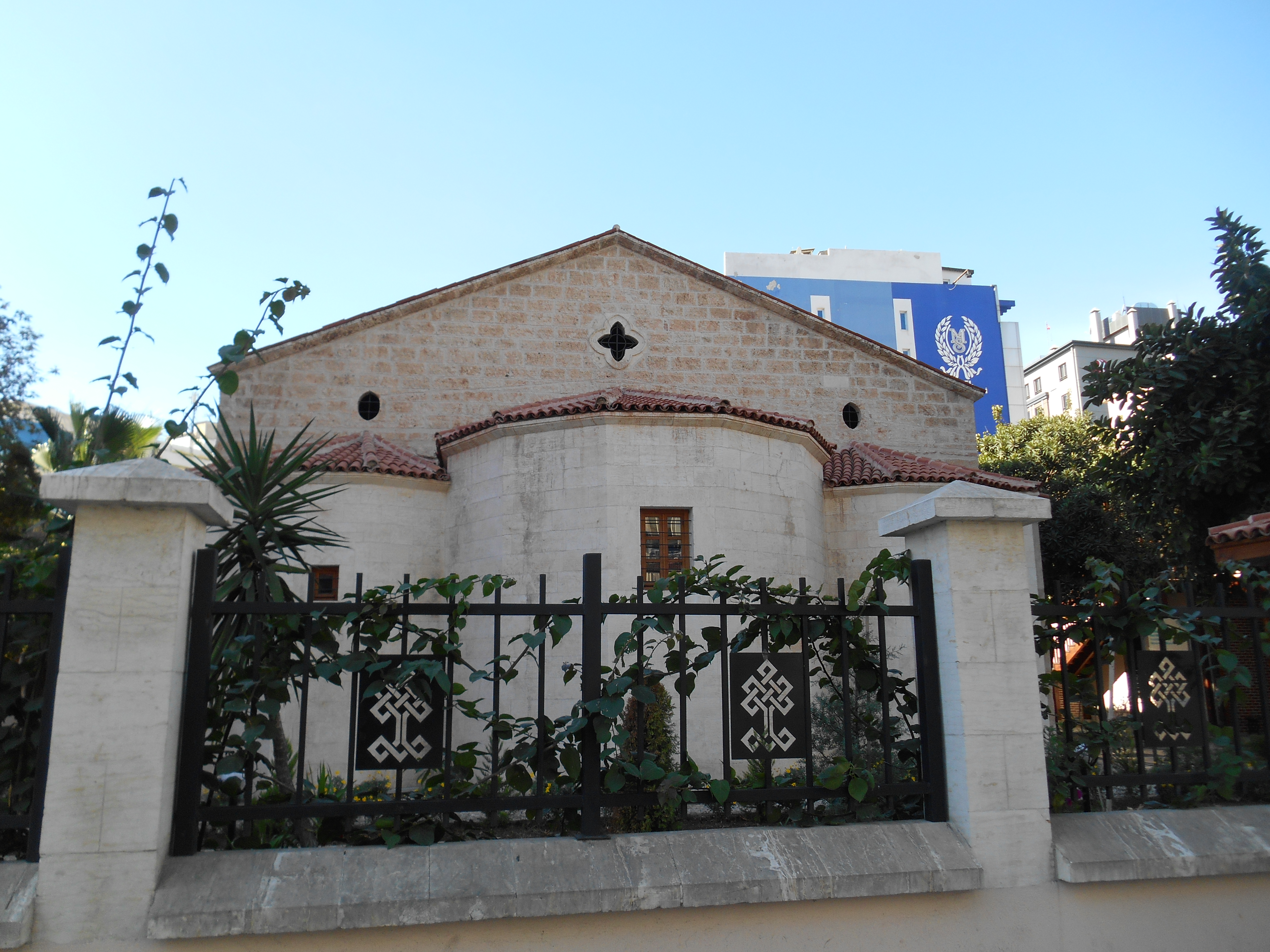
Kuruköprü Church

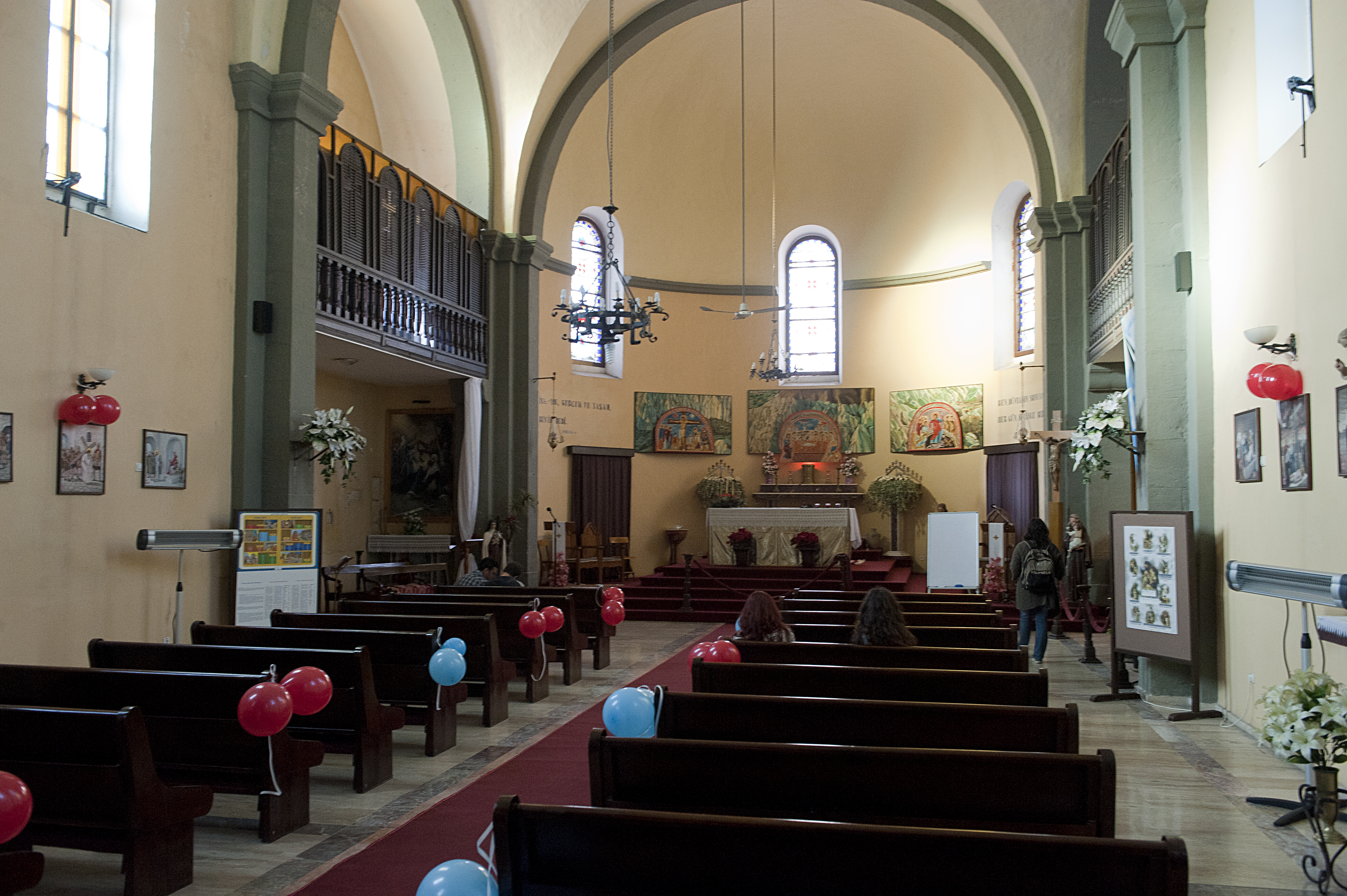
Saint Paul Church (Bebekli Kilise)

Nineteenth century Adana had four churches, two Armenian, one Greek Orthodox and one Roman Catholic. The Roman Catholic Saint Paul Church (Bebekli Kilise) was built in 1870 and is in the old town, close to 5 Ocak Square. It currently serves the Roman Catholic and Protestant communities.

The Agios Nikolaos (St Nicholas) Greek Orthodox Church was built in 1845 in the Kuruköprü area but was converted into a museum in 1950. It was reconsecrated as a church in 2015 and renamed the Kuruköprü Monumental Church.

The Armenian Church on Ali Münif Street, midway between the Yağ Camii and the Büyük Saat, was converted into a branch of the Ziraat Bank during the Republican Era. Surp Asdvadzadzin Armenian Apostolic Church on Abidinpaşa Street, which was in service until 1915, was used as a cinema until 1970 then demolished by the government. The Central Bank (Merkez Bankası) regional headquarters was built in its place.

=== Parks and gardens ===
Adana has many parks and gardens.

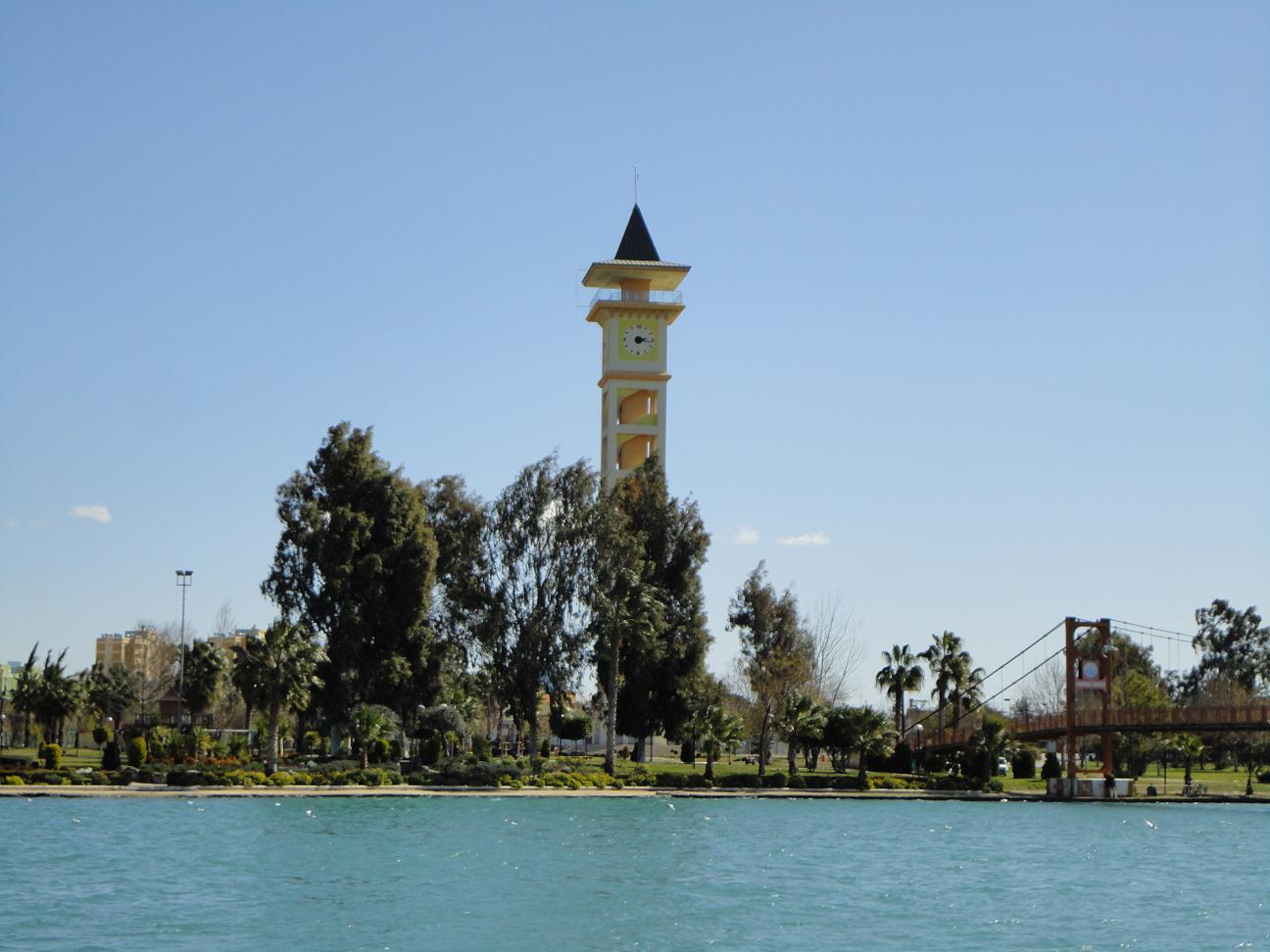
Clock Tower at Merkez Park

The Merkez Park (Central Park) is a 33-hectare urban park on both banks of the Seyhan river, just north of the Sabancı Merkez Mosque. With a 2100-seater amphitheatre, a Chinese Garden, a Rowing Club and two cafes, it is the city's main recreational area.

The Süleyman Demirel Arboretum is a large botanical garden containing collections of woody plants intended partly for scientific study by Çukurova University researchers. The arboretum is also used for recreational purposes by city residents. 512 species of plants can be found in the arboretum.

=== Other Attractions ===
The Büyük Saat (Great Clock Tower), built by the governor of Adana in 1882, is Turkey's tallest clock tower, rising 32 m (104.99 ft) high. Ramazanoğlu Hall was built in 1495 during the reign of Halil Bey.

== Society and culture ==
One of the defining features of Adana is its agriculture-based life and the agriculture-based industrial culture associated with it. However, developments in industrial life, improvements in transportation, the effects of mass communication and large-scale migration have affected Adana's culture. As in other Turkish cities, the culture in different sections of the city is often very different from that in other areas.

== Cuisine ==
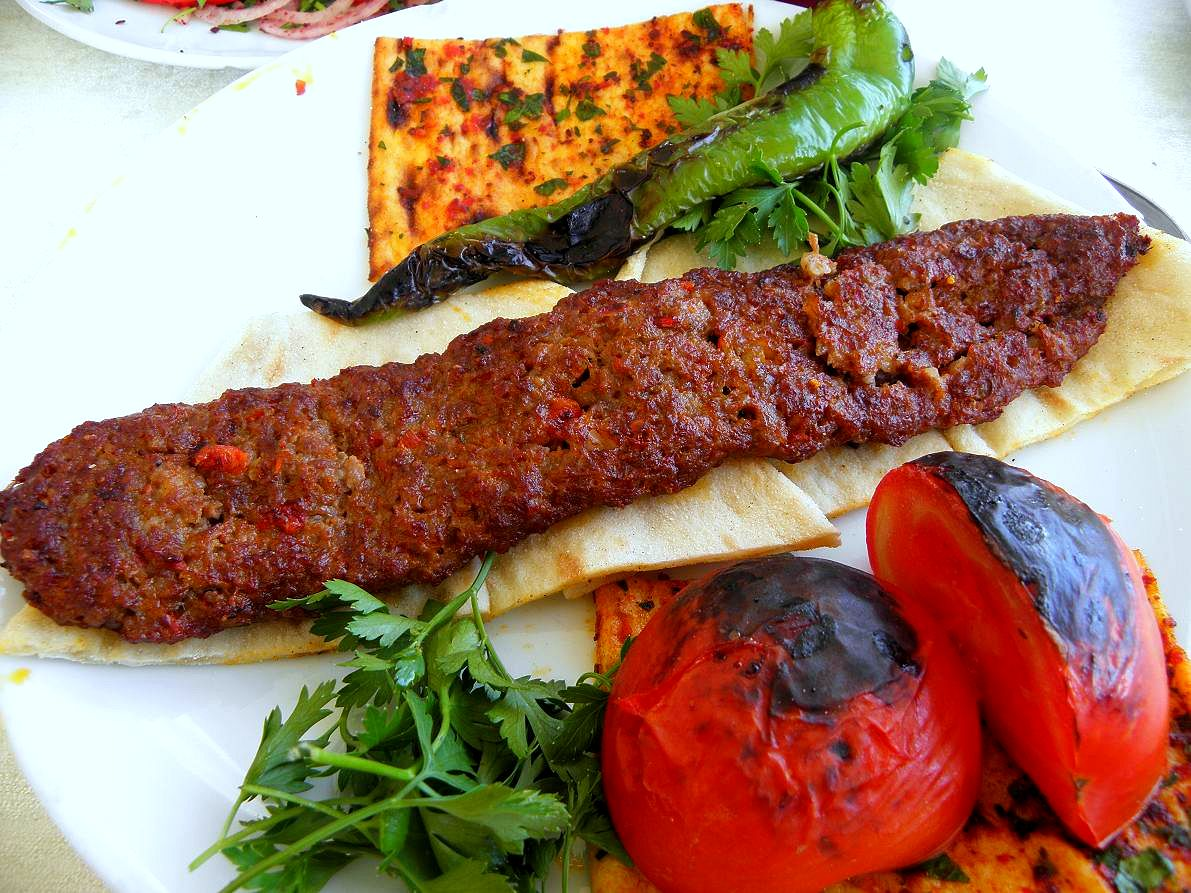
Adana kebabı

The Adana kebabı, simply called "kebap" locally, is made from minced meat and is the most popular dining choice in the city.

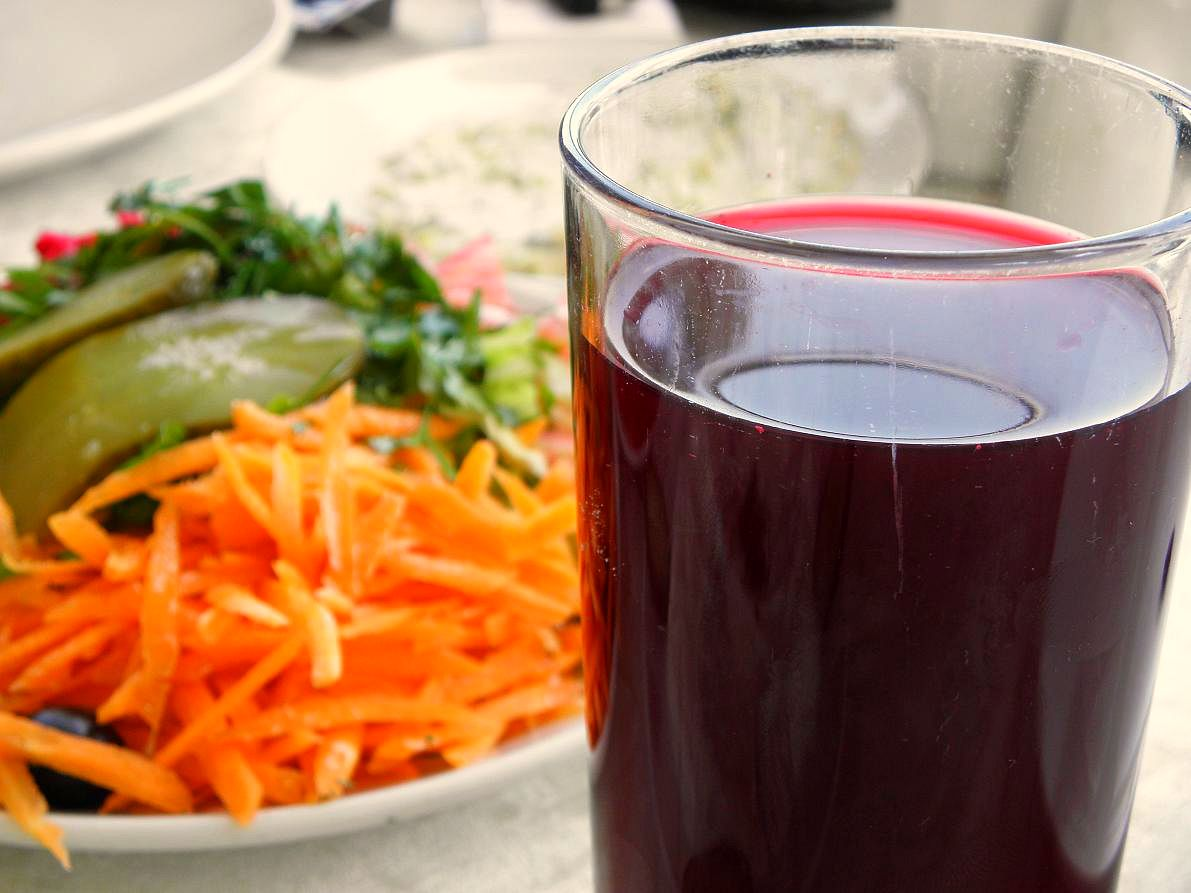
A glass of şalgam

== Arts and entertainment ==
=== Performing arts ===
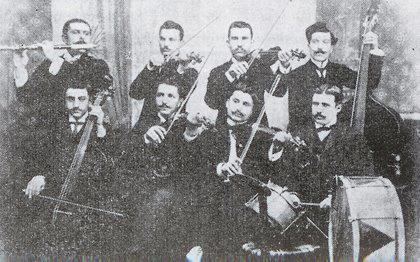
Armenian orchestra in the early 20th century

The Adana State Theatre opened its doors in 1981 at the Sabancı Cultural Centre and performs regularly from October to May.

=== Festivals ===
The International Sabancı Theatre Festival has been held every April since 1999. The opening show was staged on the Seyhan River and the Taşköprü by the Italian ensemble Studio Festi. The "Water Symphony" show was greeted with great enthusiasm.

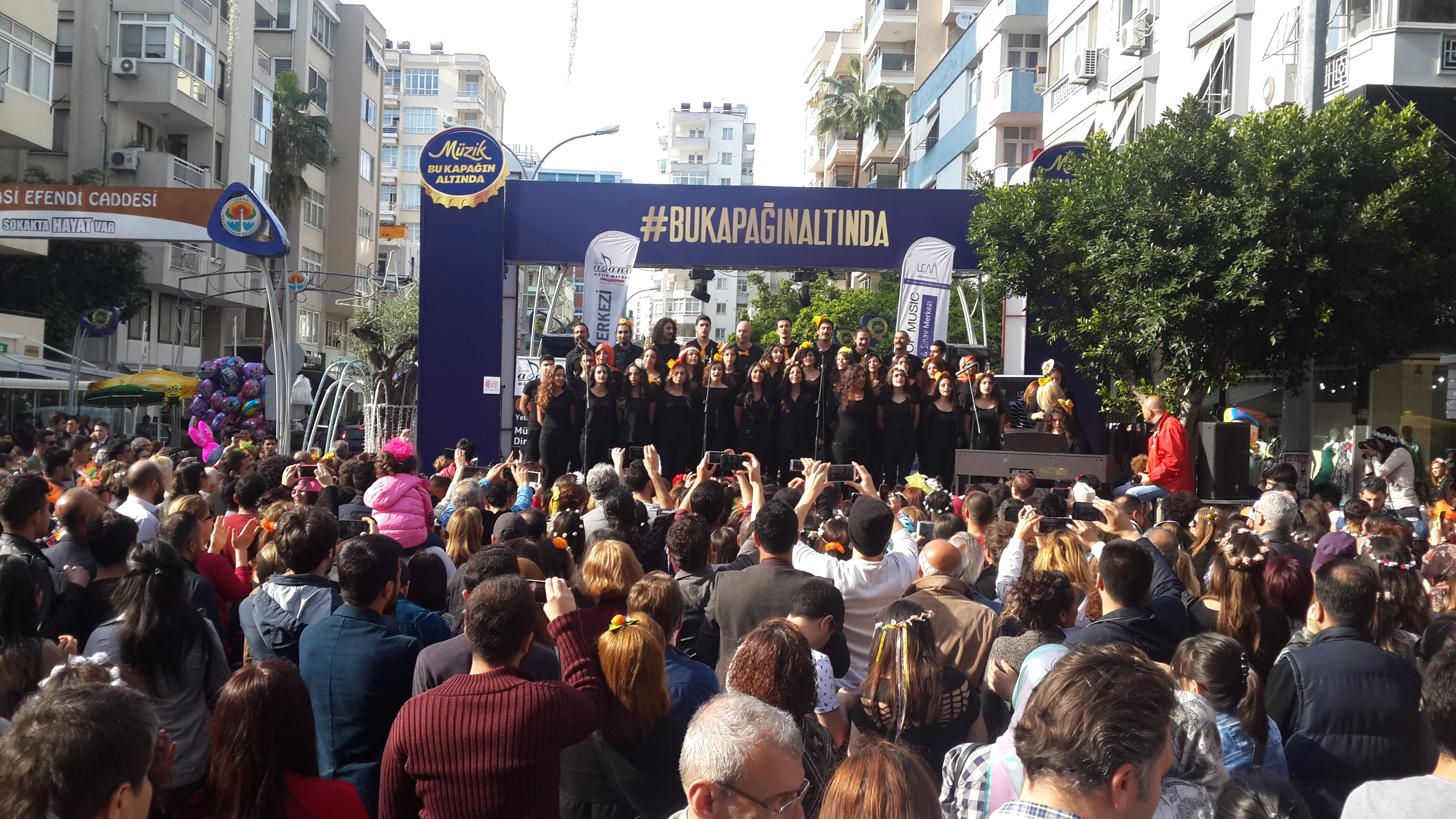
A street concert during the Orange Blossom Carnival in 2015

An Orange Blossom Carnival is held every April, inspired by the scent of the city's orange-tree-lined streets. The carnival parade of 2015 attracted more than 90.000 people—the highest ever attendance at an outdoor event in Adana.

The International Çukurova Instrumental Music Festival is a two-week long festival held annually in Adana, Antakya and Gaziantep. In 2009, the fifth festival took place with an opening concert by the Çukurova State Symphony Orchestra. Baritone Marcin Bronikowski, pianist Vania Batchvarova, guitarist Peter Finger, cellist Ozan Tunca and pianist Zöhrap Adıgüzelzade all performed at the festival.

Çukurova Art Days is a regional festival that has been taking place annually since 2007 in Adana, Mersin, Tarsus, Antakya, İskenderun, Silifke, Anamur and (in the past) in Aleppo.

=== Nightlife ===
During the mid-20th century, Adana was well known for its vibrant nightlife and many pavyons which mostly functioned as adult entertainment clubs, similar to the Japanese hostess clubs, with live music and a lounge with tables lined up on the ground floor and private rooms upstairs. The first pavyons opened before 1942 with the arrival of Englishmen who worked on the Adana-Ulukışla road that was funded by the British Government in an effort to persuade Turkey to join World War II.

The pavyons led the way for Western-style pubs and nightclubs by the late 1980s as Adana underwent big socio-economic changes. The traditional entertainment district was Sular, near the Central Station, but nowadays pubs and clubs are spread throughout the city. The bigger clubs are mostly along the river and around the lake. There are still two active pavyons, Afrodit and Maksim, but now most adult entertainment is directed at what is known locally as tele-bars which are licensed as regular pubs but function as places where bargirls entertain customers. There are around twenty tele-bars mainly in the city centre and around the old dam.

A hundred-year-long tradition of dining on kebab, liver and rakı in the Kazancılar Bazaar, with street music and dancing, turned into a festival with all-night entertainment in 2010. The World Rakı Festival, officially renamed the Adana Kebab and Şalgam Festival, is held on the second Saturday night of December and attracts more than 20,000 people to the old town.

=== Sports ===
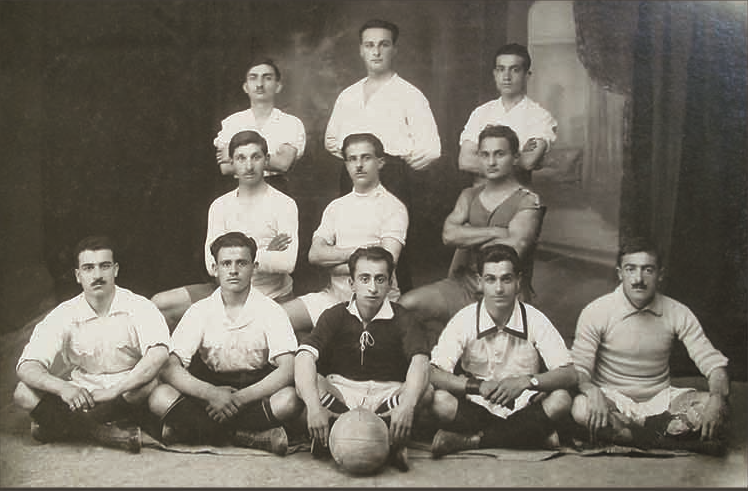
Armenian club Shant, one of the first football clubs of the city

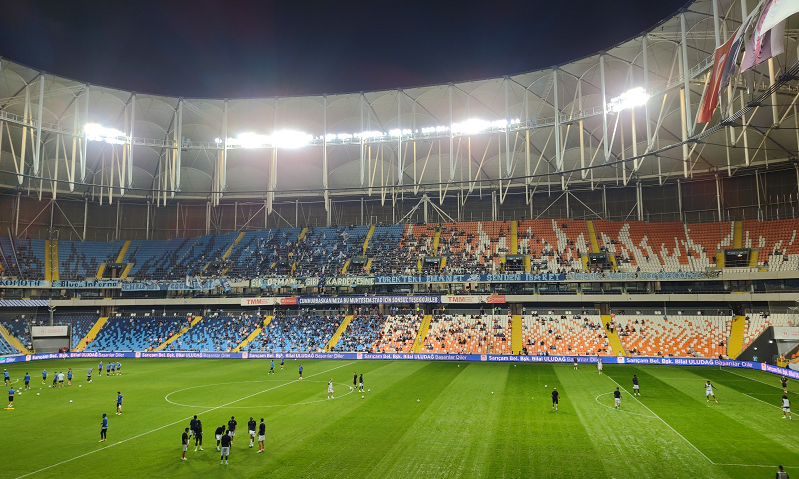
New Adana Stadium

Athletic sport life had progressed in Cilicia with the coaches that were invited to Adana from Istanbul in the early 20th century. Varag Pogharian and Mateos Zarifian played an important role in organising the athletic movement and the first sports clubs in the city were founded by the Armenian community. In 1913, Adana Türkgücü was founded by Ahmet Remzi Bey and İsmail Sefa Bey in alliance with the Istanbul Türkgücü club that had been initiated by the Committee of Union and Progress. Adana's athletic clubs joined the Cilician Olympic Games held in April 1914 at a venue north of Dörtyol, a first of its kind for the region.

Football is the most popular sport in Adana although basketball, volleyball and handball are also played widely at professional and amateur levels. Warm weather makes the city a haven for sports like rowing, sailing, swimming and water polo. Horse racing and horse riding are also popular. The biannual Men's European Wheelchair Basketball Championship took place in Adana on 5–15 October 2009; twelve countries competed and Italy won the title after a final game against Turkey. Adana also hosted the 2013 IWBF Men's U23 Wheelchair Basketball World Championship. The 1967 Women's European Volleyball Championship was organised in Turkey with Adana a host city along with Istanbul, Ankara and İzmir. Group C games are played in Adana at the Menderes Sports Hall.

Club	Sport	League	Venue (capacity)	Founded
Adana Demirspor	Football (men)	Süper Lig	New Adana Stadium (33,543)	1940
Adanaspor	Football (men)	TFF First League	New Adana Stadium (33,543)	1954
Adana 01 FK	Football (men)	TFF Second League	Ali Hoşfikirer Stadı (2544)	2019
Adana İdman Yurdu	Football (women)	Women's Super League	Muharrem Gülergin Stadium	1940
Çukurova Belediyesi Spor	Volleyball (women)	Turkish Women's Volleyball League	Atatürk Sports Hall (2000)	2020
01 Adana Basketbol	Basketball (women)	Turkish Women's Basketball League	Menderes Sports Hall (2000)	2022

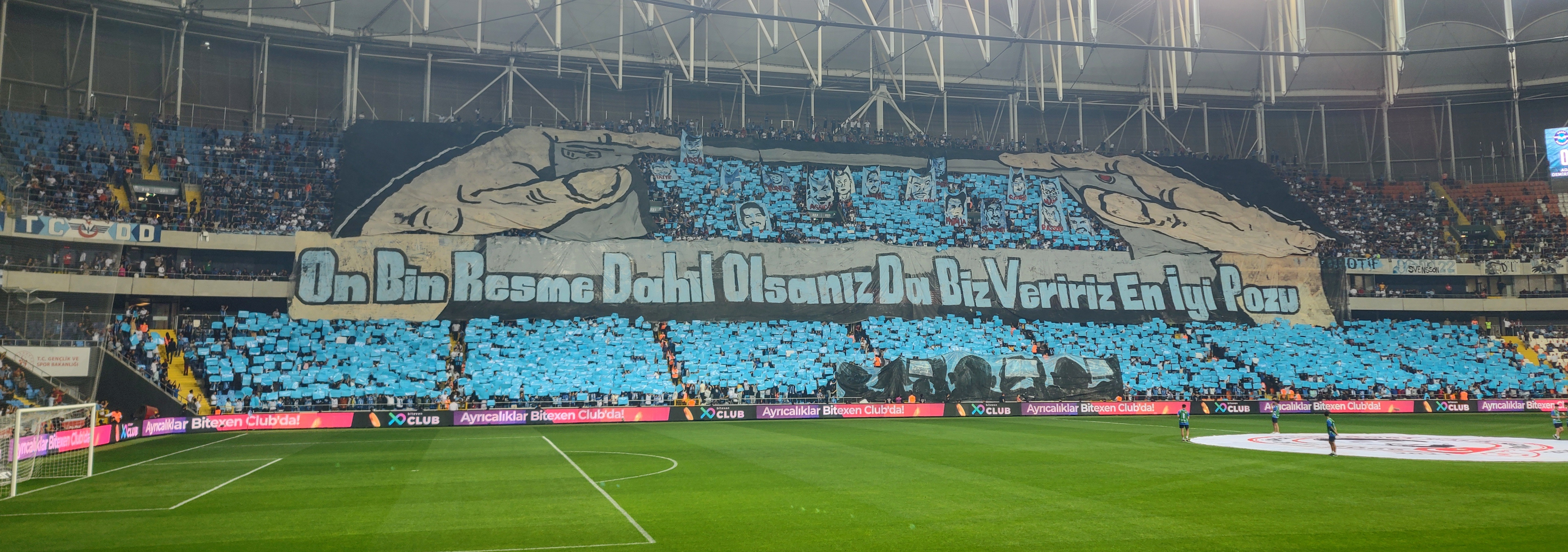
Adana Demirspor panorama

Adanaspor and Adana Demirspor are the two Adana clubs that appear in the Turkish Professional Football League. After twelve years, Adanaspor returned to the Super Lig.

Adana ASKİ is the major club for Women's Pro-Basketball, performing in the Turkish Women's Basketball League (TKBL). Adana ASKİ was founded as Ceyhan Belediyespor in 2000, and was renamed and moved to Adana in 2014. After the move, the club had its best season ever (2014–15), playing in the final of the Turkish Women's Cup and the semi-final of the TKBL First Division. Adana ASKİ also play their home games at Menderes Sports Hall. Adanaspor, relegated to the third tier of the Turkish Men's Basketball League in 2016, play their home games at the Menderes Sports Hall. Wheelchair basketball clubs Adana Engelliler and Martı Engelliler play in the first division of the Turkish Wheelchair Basketball League, both playing their home games at the Serinevler Sports Hall.

Professional volleyball club Adana Toros was promoted to the top flight of the Turkish Men's Volleyball League on 12 April 2016 at the play-off finals in Bursa. Adana Toros play their home games at the Menderes Sports Hall. The city's handball club, Şakirpaşa HEM, was promoted to the Turkish Women's Handball Super League on 21 April 2016, at the play-off finals in Ankara. The venue of Şakirpaşa is Yüreğir Serinevler Arena.

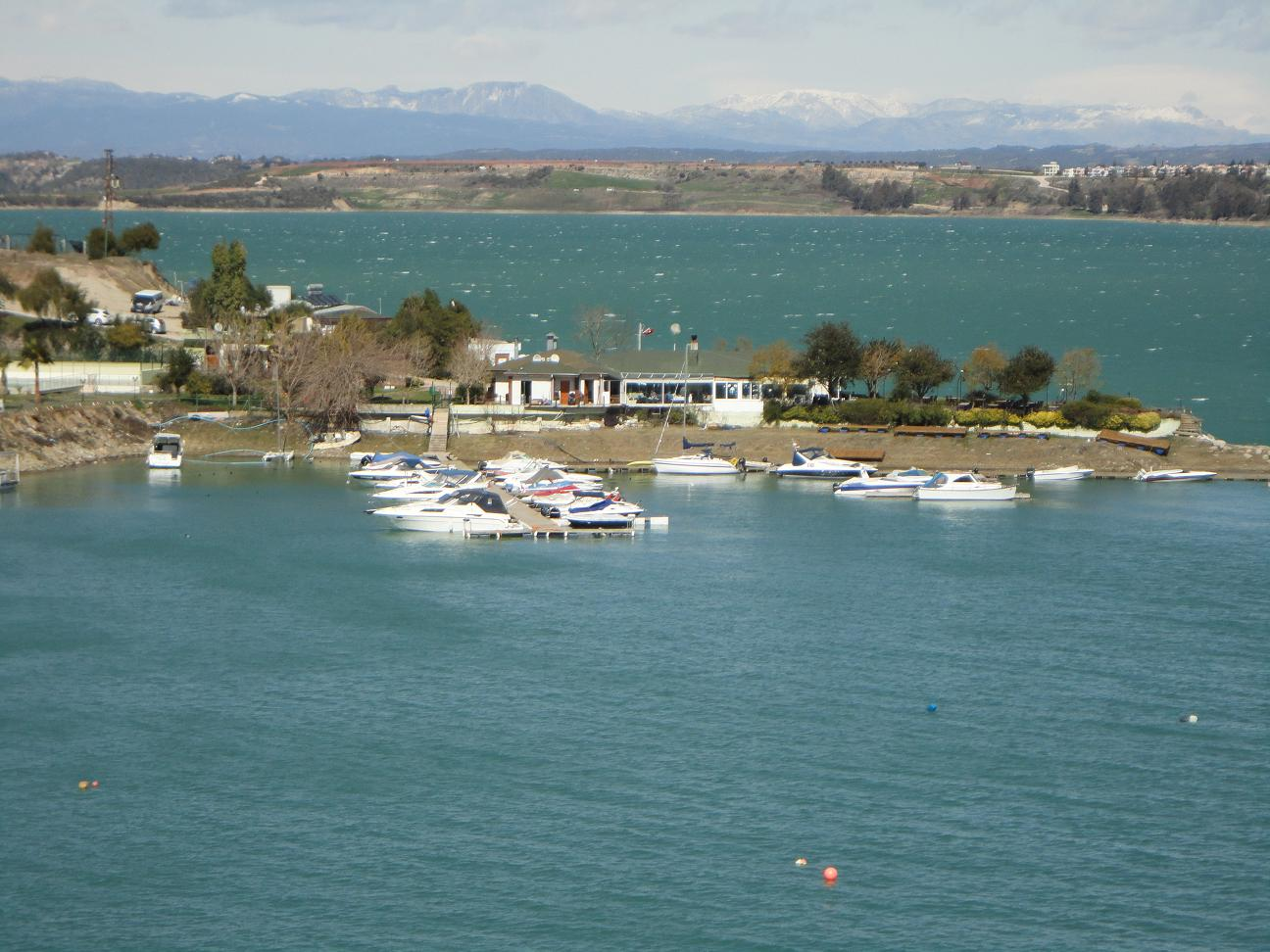
Adana Sailing Club

Water sports are also popular in Adana. Adana Demirspor's water polo team is a legend in the community, joining the Turkish Water Polo League in 1942 after Turkey's first modern watersports venue, the Atatürk Swimming Complex, opened in Adana in 1936. The team has a record twenty-two years of straight championship titles in the Turkish Men's Water Polo League, seventeen years of it without losing a game, hence their nickname "The Unbeatables". Demirspor has a total of twenty-nine championship titles.

Rowing became a popular local sport in the last twenty years. Rowing competitions are held all year long on the Seyhan River and the Seyhan Reservoir. The Metropolitan Rowing Club and Çukurova University SK compete at the national and international level. Sailing competitions are also held at the Seyhan Reservoir all year round. The Adana Sailing Club competes at regattas in different categories. In swimming, Erdal Acet of Adana Demirspor is a prominent local figure, who broke the record for swimming the English Channel in nine hours and two minutes in 1976. Recreationally, the lack of swimming pools make the Seyhan River and the irrigation canals attractive for swimmers who want to cool off in the hot, humid summers. With almost one hundred people drowning every year, the Metropolitan Municipality has now opened forty-one swimming pools.

The Adana Half Marathon was inaugurated in 2011 on a national level with the participation of 223 athletes. In 2012, the marathon gained IAAF International Marathon status and hosted 610 athletes from ten nations. The marathon takes place on the first Sunday after 5 January, Adana's Independence Day. The route follows Adana's historic streets and the streets along the Seyhan river.

== Media ==
Adana has several daily newspapers, the most popular being the Yeni Adana, Ekspres, Toros, Bölge and 5 Ocak papers. The oldest newspaper, Yeni Adana (New Adana), dates back to 1918.

== Education ==
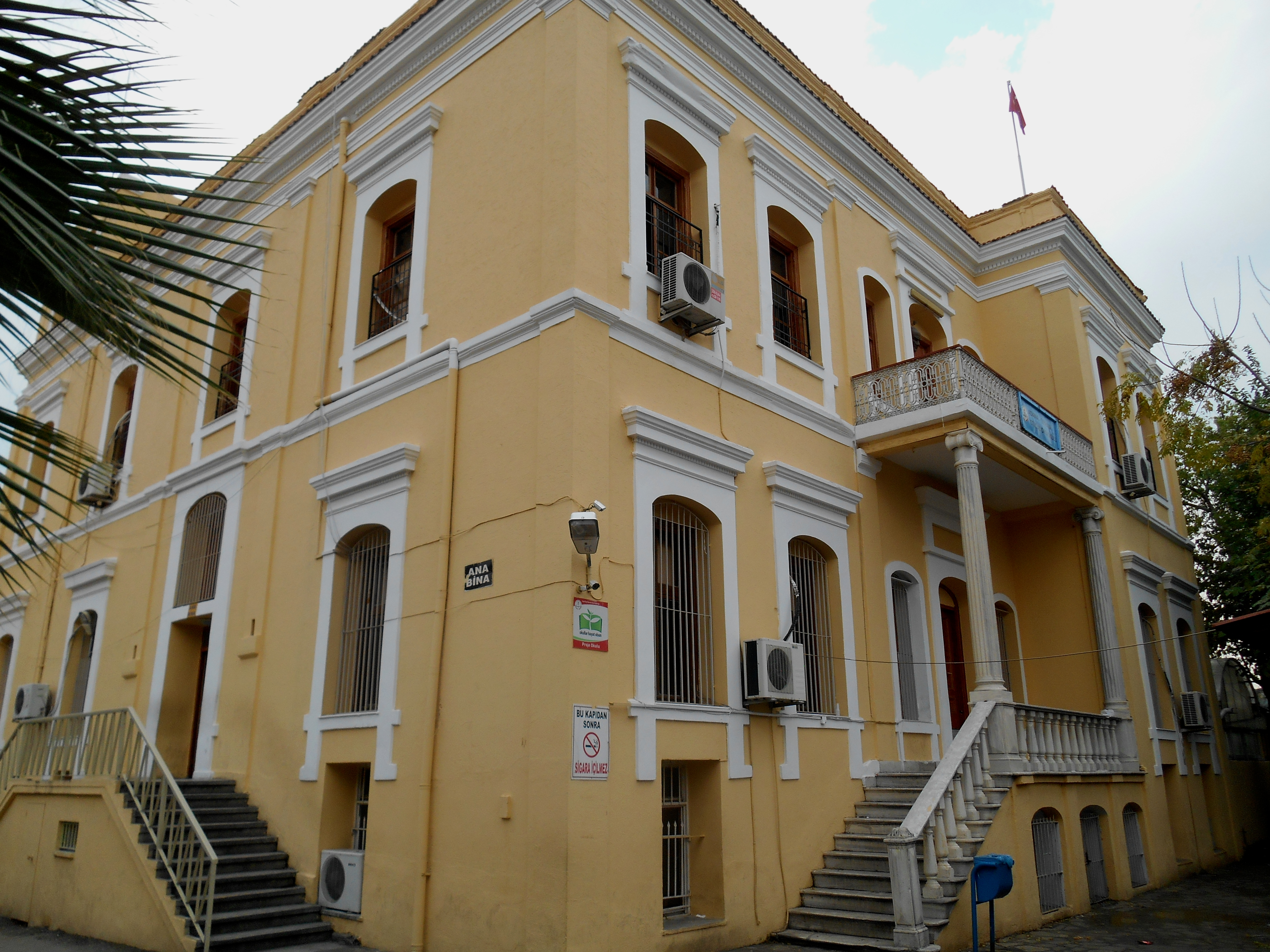
İstiklal High School (former Greek mansion)

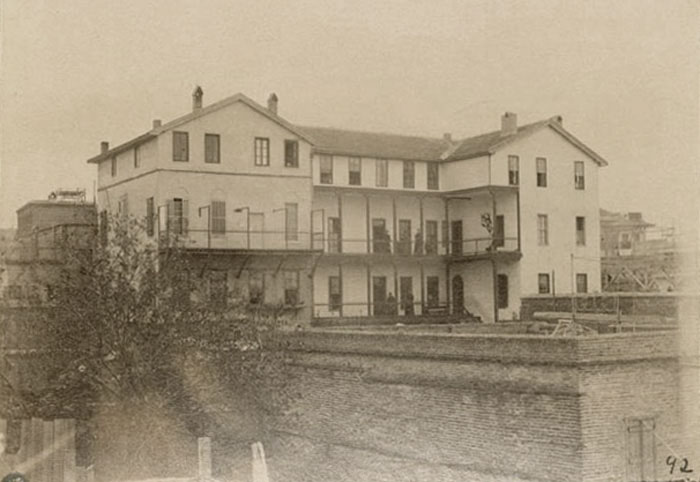
Former Adana American College for Girls

=== Schools ===
Public, private and not-for-profit institutions are located in Adana. Primary and secondary education in the city is regulated by the provincial directorate of the national Ministry of Education which also administers the state schools.

There are 282 public and 12 private primary schools which pupils attend from grades 1 to 8. From grades 9 to 11, pupils go to one of the 85 public and 26 private high schools. Notable high schools of the city with entrance exams include the state-owned Adana Fen and Adana Anadolu High Schools, and the private Gündoğdu and Bilfen High Schools. The Adana Gundogdu Schools is the largest private school in Adana and expands every year. There are six public and six private schools for pupils with special needs. Nine Community Training Centres help adult residents improve their skills.

The requirement to pass an entrance exam for admission to high schools and universities and for a career in the civil service led to the opening of more than one hundred crammer schools (Turkish: dershane) in the city.

=== Libraries ===
The Ramazanoğlu Library was founded in 1923 by combining two smaller libraries. It moved to its current location in the Sabancı Cultural Centre in 1976 and was renamed the Adana Public Library. It also has a branch in the Karacaoğlan Museum of Literature. Seyhan, Yüreğir, Sarıçam and Karaisalı also have public libraries administered by each district. Adana City Library specialises in publications about Adana and Çukurova's history and culture, and has a good collection of photography and films about the city. It is located in the Adana Centre for Arts and Culture.

=== Fairs ===
The fifth Çukurova Book Fair took place in 2012, hosting 182,450 visitors from Çukurova and neighbouring regions. More than two hundred publishers and volunteer organisations had stands, more than 50 cultural events were performed and 300 authors were present to meet their readers. At the same time, the Çukurova Education Fair was organised at the Tüyap Exhibition Centre with the participation of 45 education institutions.

=== Universities ===
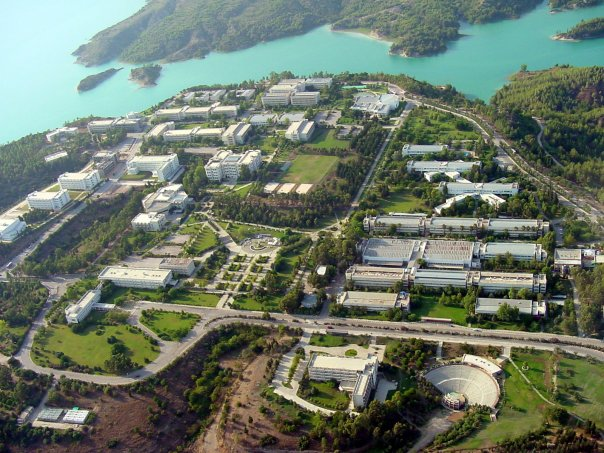
Çukurova University Balcalı Campus

Çukurova University is a state university located on the eastern shore of the Seyhan Reservoir. In 2008, it was ranked one of the top 500 universities in the world according to research conducted by Blackwell Publishing, Quacquarelli Symonds and The Times. It was founded in 1973 following the merger of the colleges of Agriculture and Medicine. Its campus has many cultural, social and athletic facilities for its 40,000 students.

Adana University for Science and Technology is a newer state university with nine faculties, two institutions and a college.

== Healthcare ==
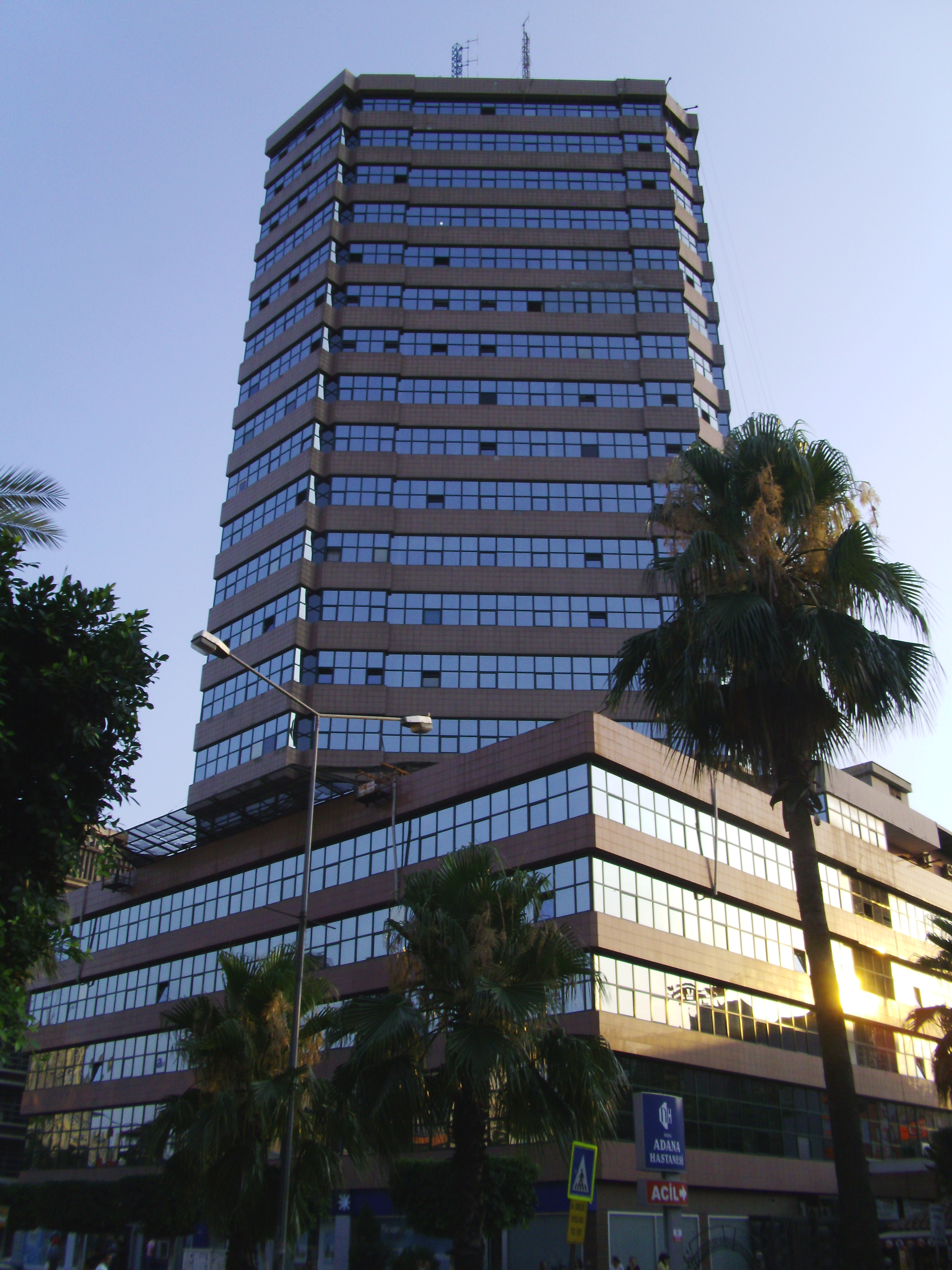
Adana Hospital

Part of Çukurova University, Balcalı Hospital is a research hospital that was founded in 1987 after the Faculty of Medicine moved to the main campus. It has 1050 inpatient beds in 47 service units, a 58-bed intensive care unit and a 17-bed emergency unit. The largest hospital in Southern and Southeastern Anatolia, it is also one of the biggest hospitals of Turkey.

A new health campus is expected to open in Yüreğir by 2014, which will include a 600-bed General Hospital, 200-bed Heart and Stroke Hospital, 250-bed maternity hospital, 100-bed oncology hospital, 150-bed Physiotherapy and Rehabilitation Centre and 100-bed Psychiatry Hospital. The campus will have a capacity of 1400 inpatients and will be connected to the Hastaneler area via a bridge over the Seyhan river which will create one big campus.

== Transportation ==
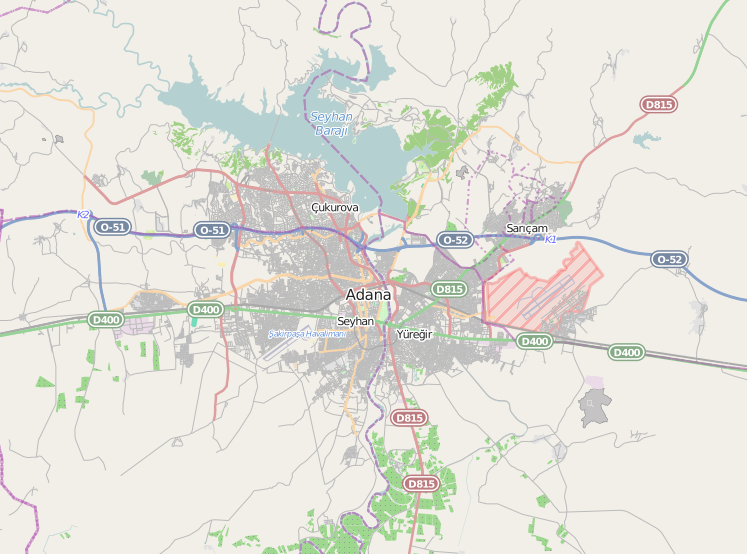
Map of the road network of Adana

=== Intercity transport ===
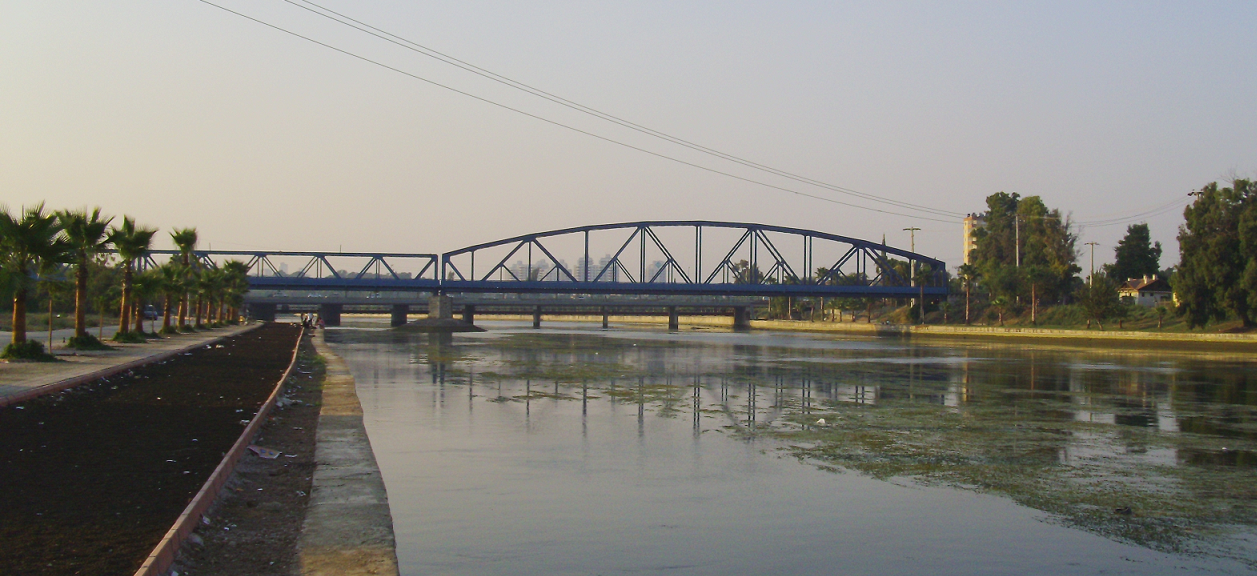
Demirköprü

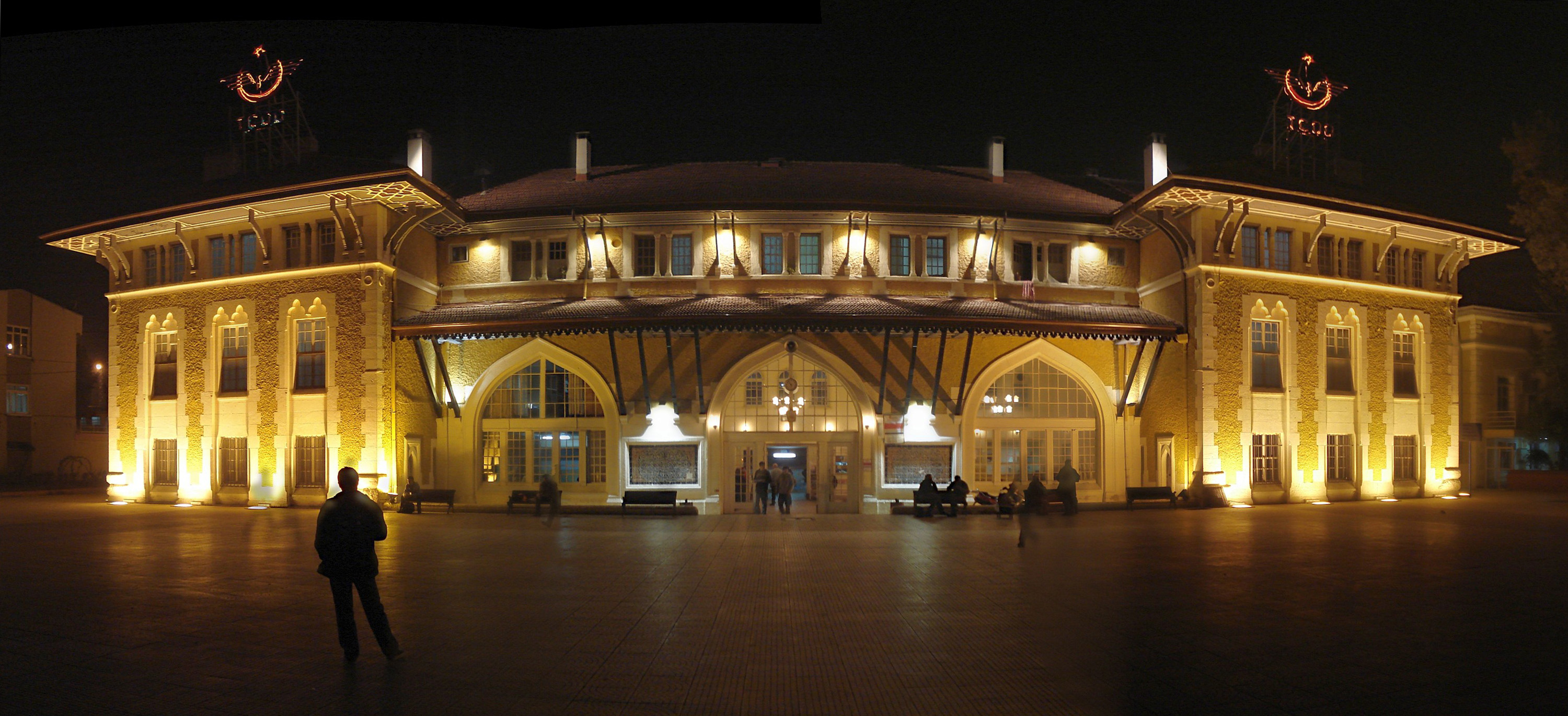
Adana Railway Station

Adana's closest airport is Çukurova International Airport, located 34 km (21 mi) from the city centre. It is the sixth busiest airport in Turkey. There are international flights to major cities of Germany, to Beirut, Jeddah, London, Amsterdam, Brussels, Moscow and Nicosia (TRNC), and frequent domestic flights to Istanbul, Ankara, İzmir, Antalya, Trabzon, Bodrum and Van.

Turkish State Railways (TCDD) runs five long-distance lines connecting Adana to Ankara, Kayseri, Karaman, Konya and Elazığ. All these lines use the Central Railway Station while some also use the city's other railway stations—Şehitlik and Şakirpaşa stations to the west, Kiremithane, İncirlik and Yakapınar stations o the east. TCDD also runs three regional lines across Çukurova. The Adana-Mersin Line operates as a commuter train with 27 trains daily. Services to Osmaniye–Islahiye and to İskenderun run once a day. Regional trains stop at all city stations.

=== Local transport ===
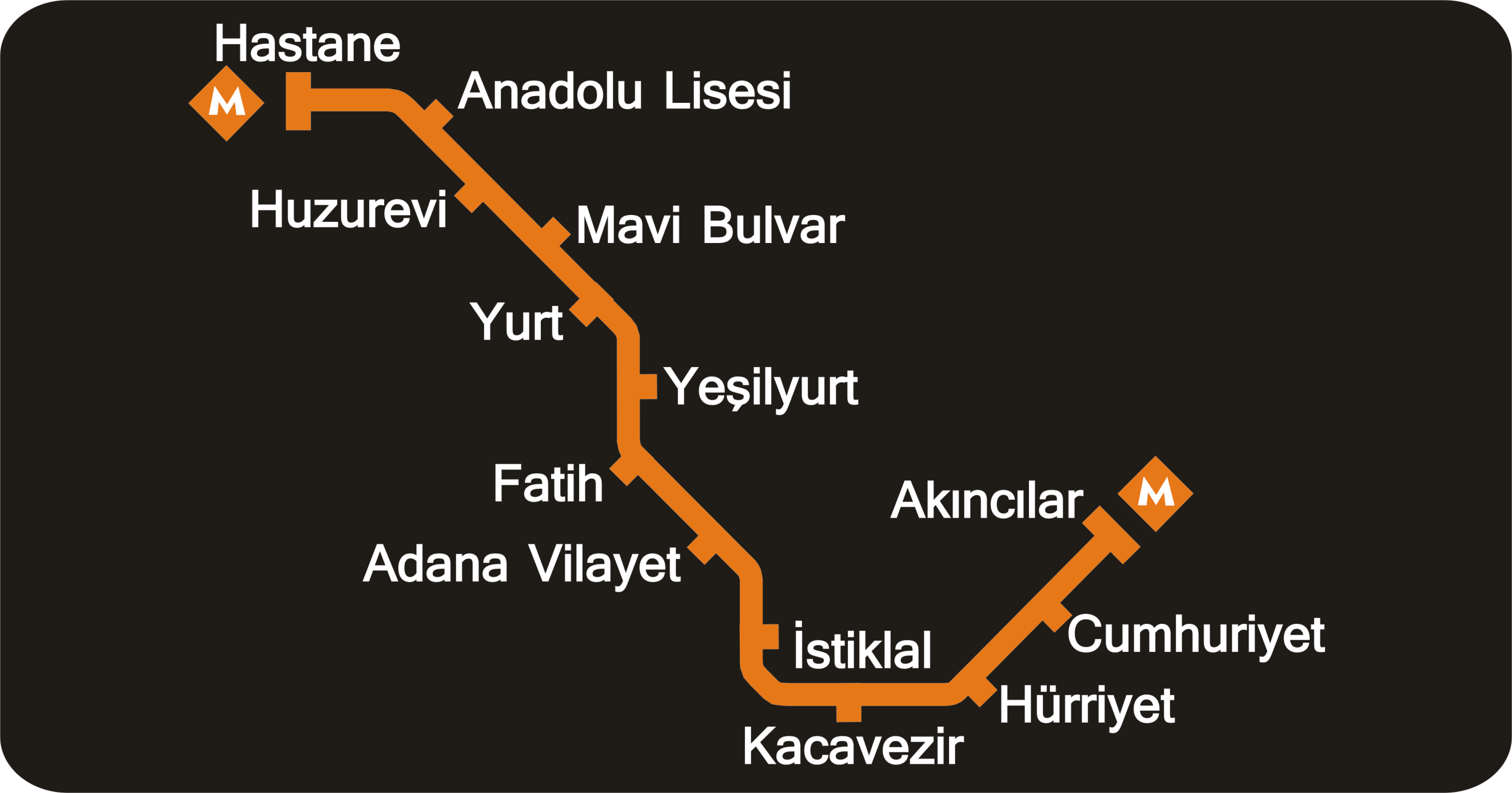
Map of the Adana Metro

Adana Metro is a rapid transit system that extends 14 kilometres (9 miles) from the north-west to the city centre and Yüreğir. The Metro M1 line has thirteen stations and can transport 21,600 passengers an hour in each direction, a complete journey taking twenty minutes. A planned second line will run from Akıncılar to Çukurova University in the Sarıçam District. It will be 9.5 kilometres (6 miles) long and will have seven stations..The Metro will eventually cover 23.5 kilometres (14.6 miles) and serve 20 stations.

== International relations ==
Adana is twinned with:

Europe: Córdoba, Andalusia, Spain; Skopje, North Macedonia; Saint Petersburg, Russia; Livorno, Italy; Debrecen, Hungary	Asia: Beersheba, Israel; Jeddah, Saudi Arabia; Shymkent, Kazakhstan; Sapporo, Japan; Ulaanbaatar, Mongolia

== Notable people ==
- List of people from Adana and Category:People from Adana

== Gallery ==
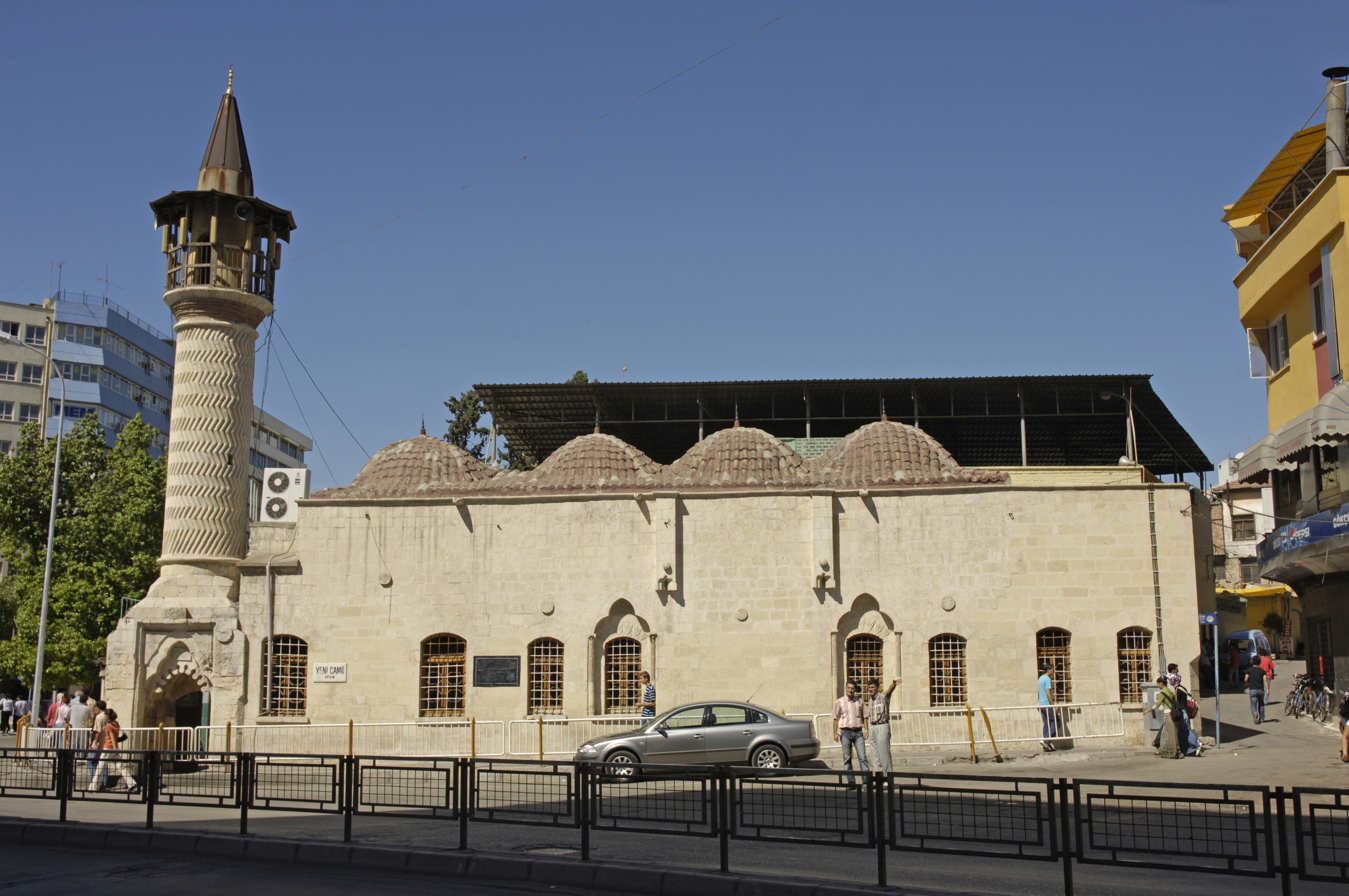
Adana Yeni Camii (New Mosque) – Side view

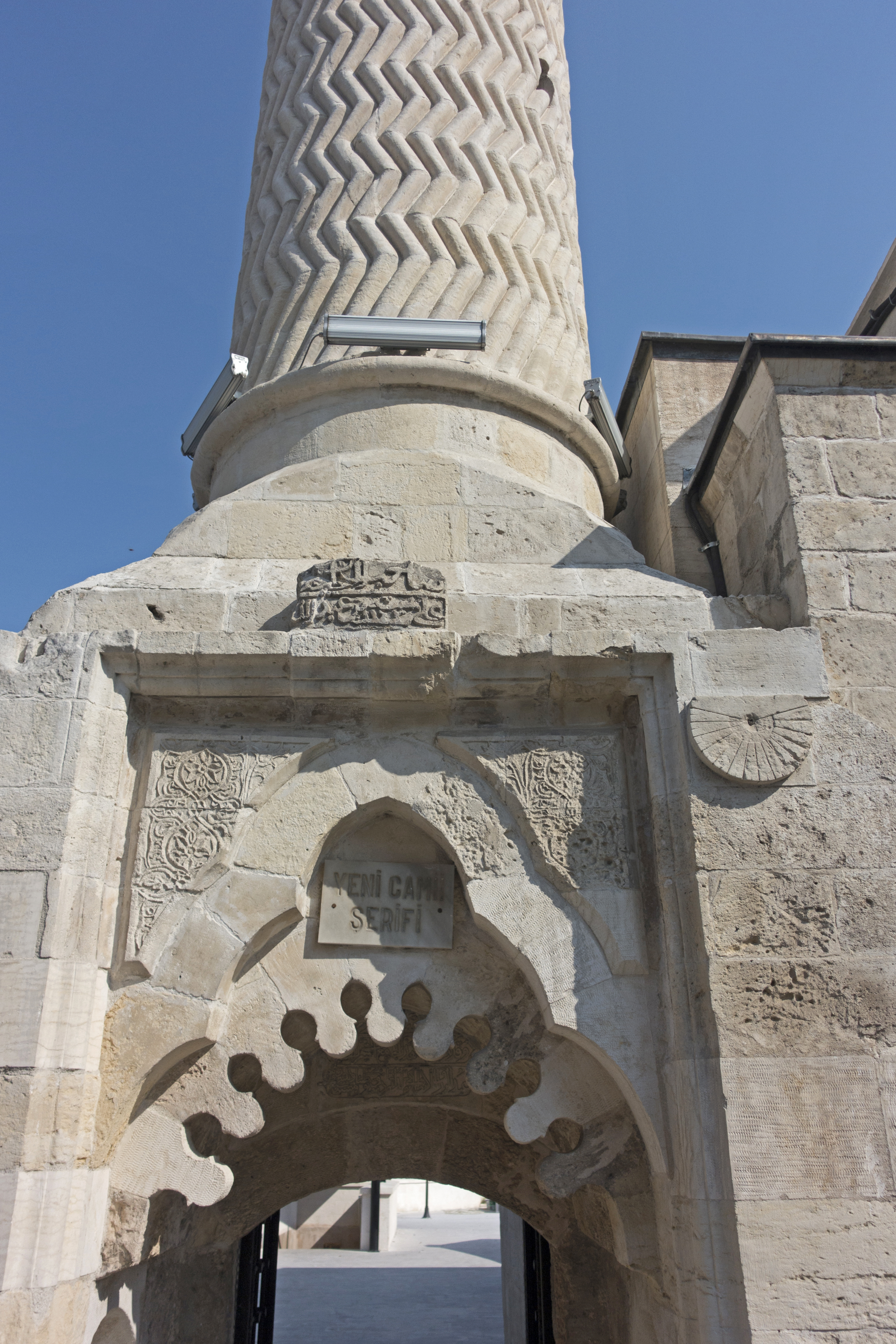
Adana Yeni Camii (New Mosque) – Entrance to courtyard

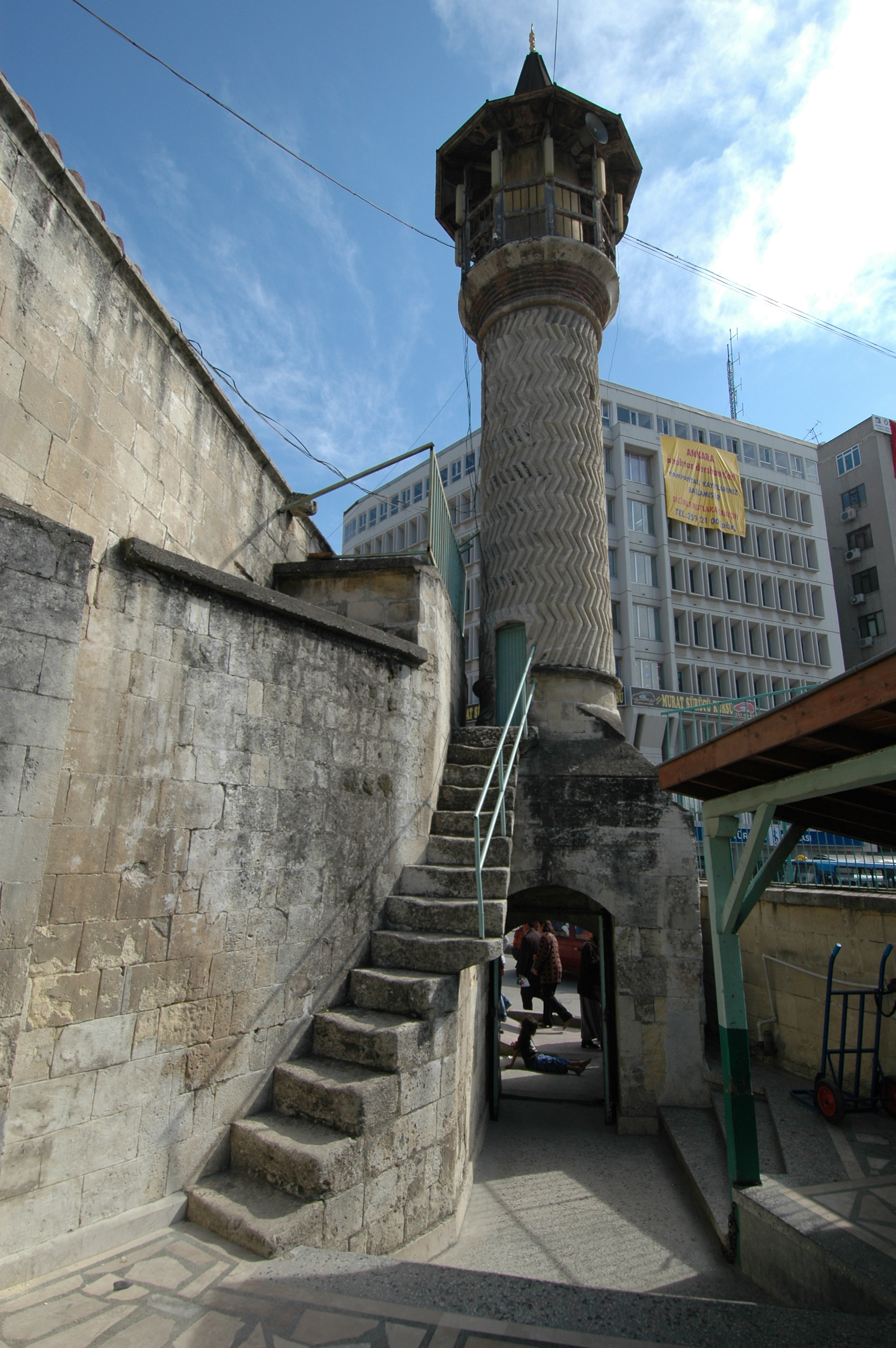
Adana Yeni Camii (New Mosque) – Entrance to courtyard's backside

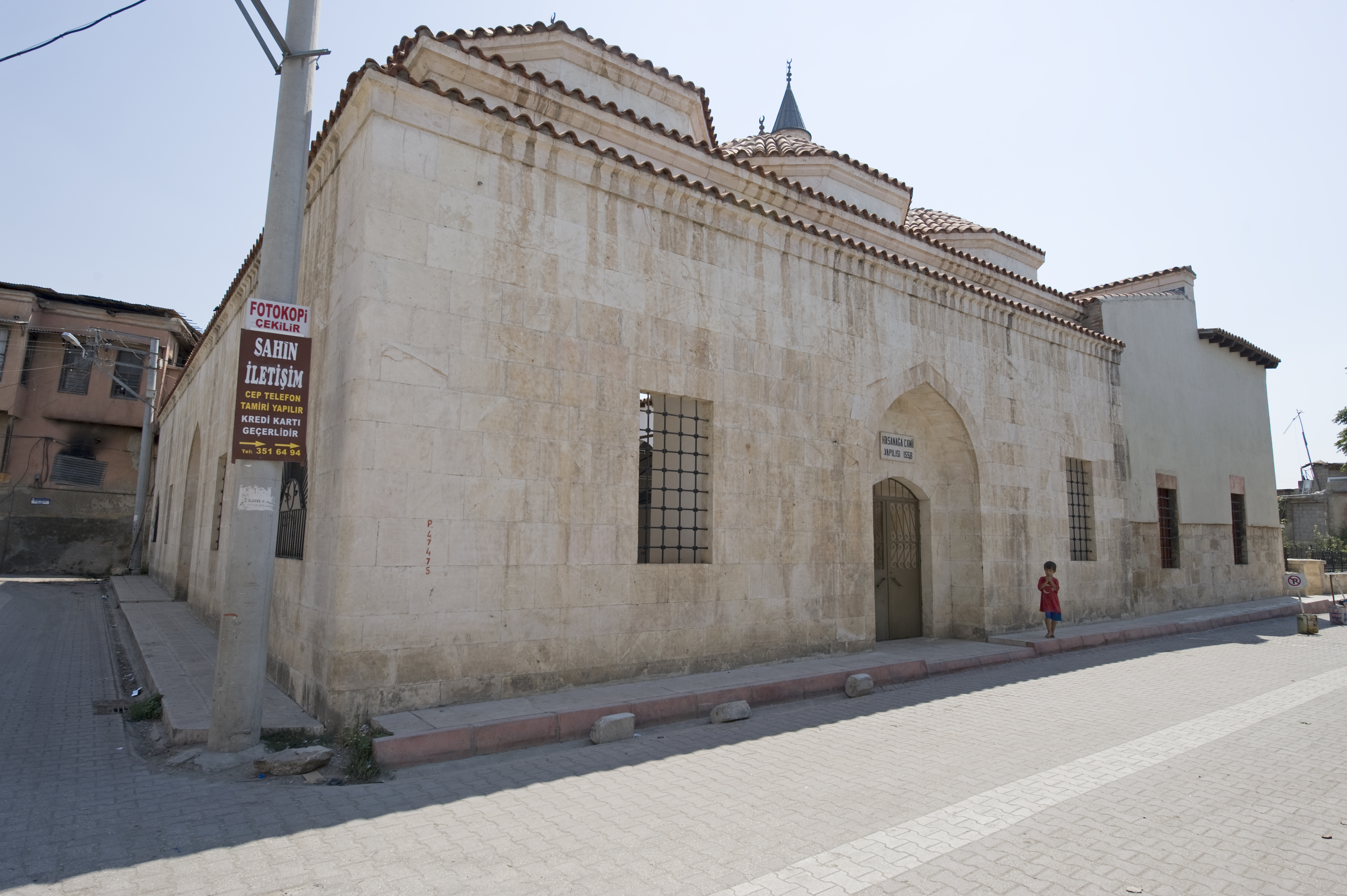
Adana Hasan Ağa mosque – Exterior

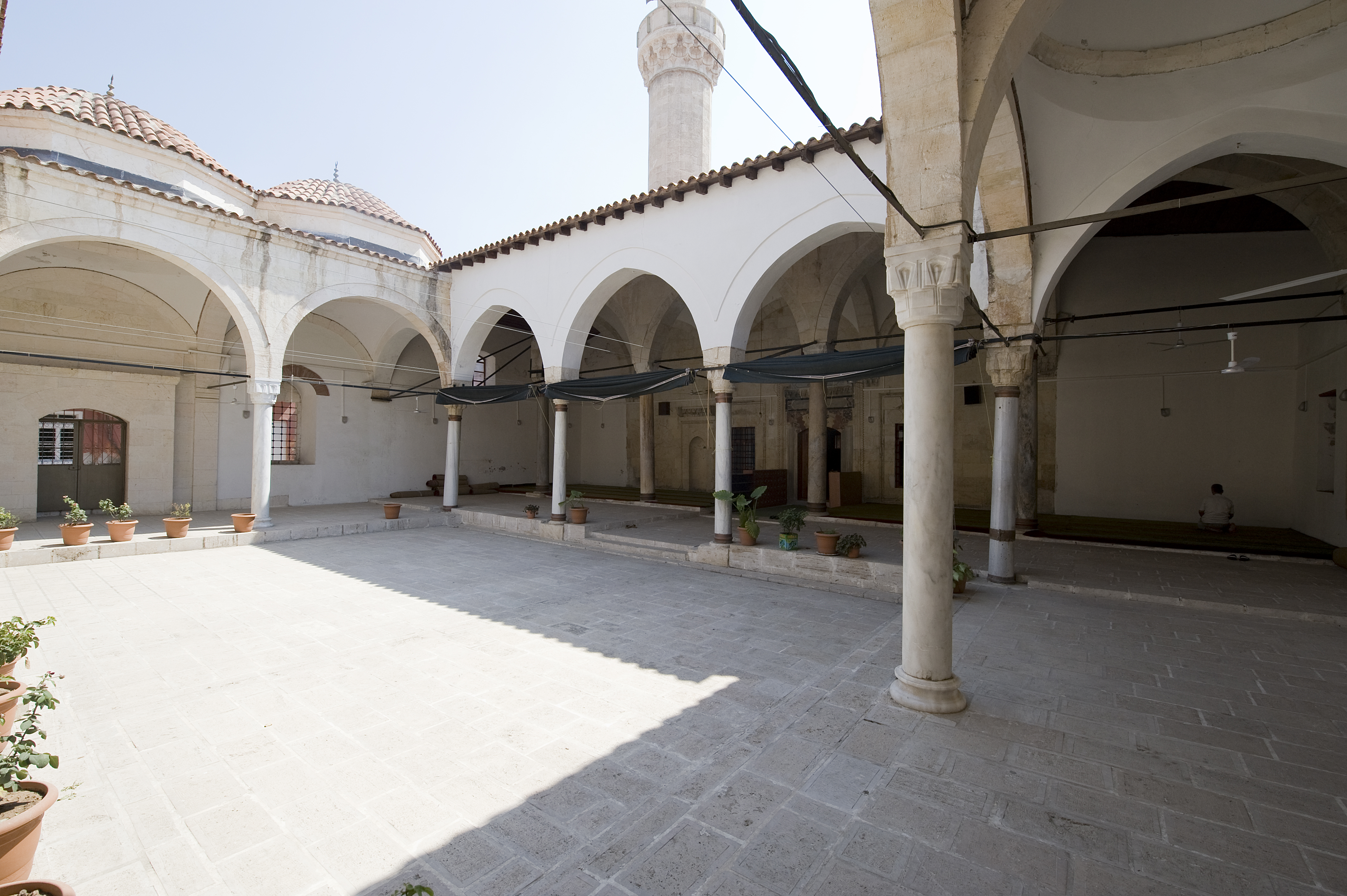
Adana Hasan Ağa mosque – Courtyard

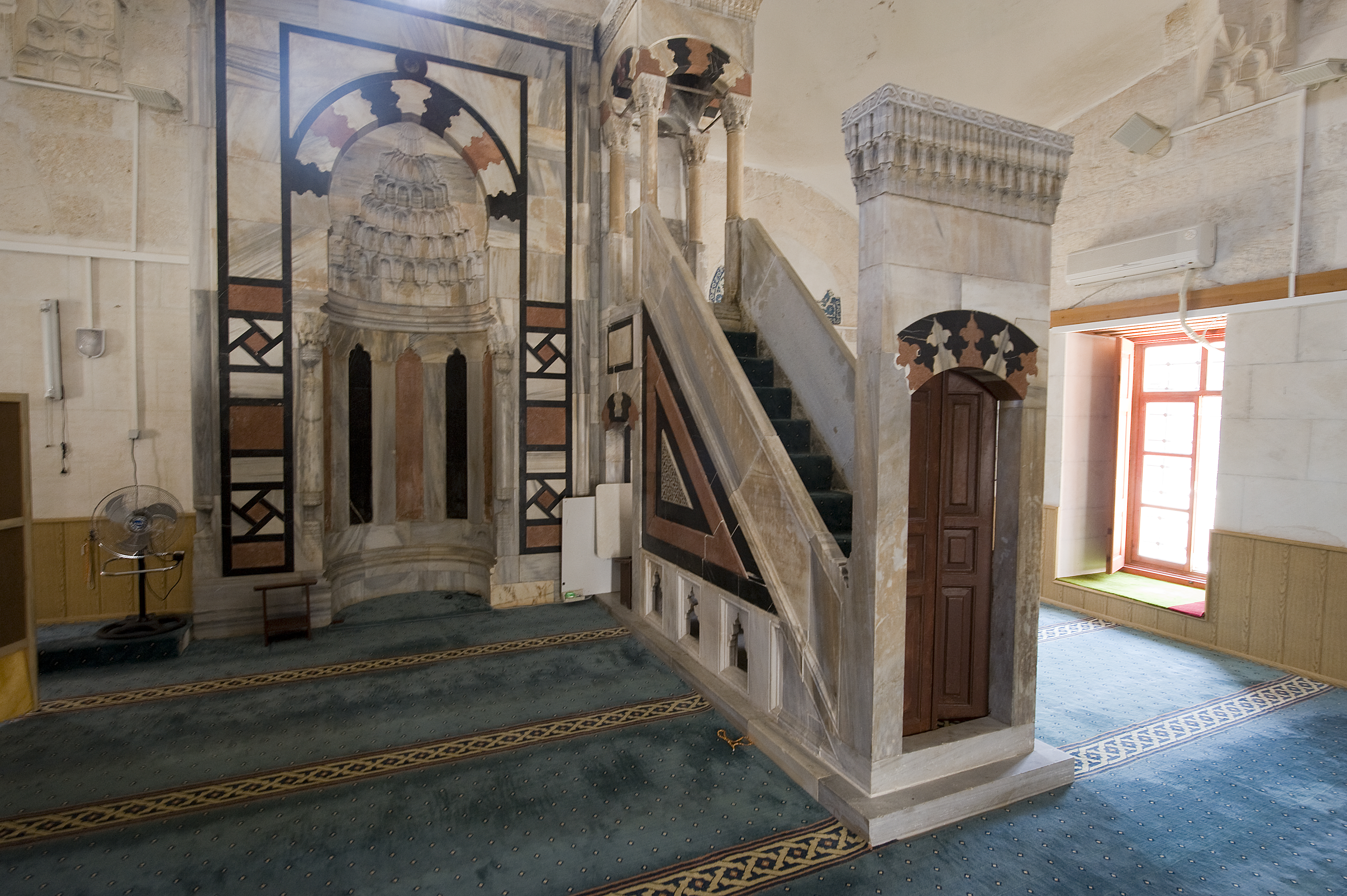
Adana Hasan Ağa mosque – Mihrab and minber

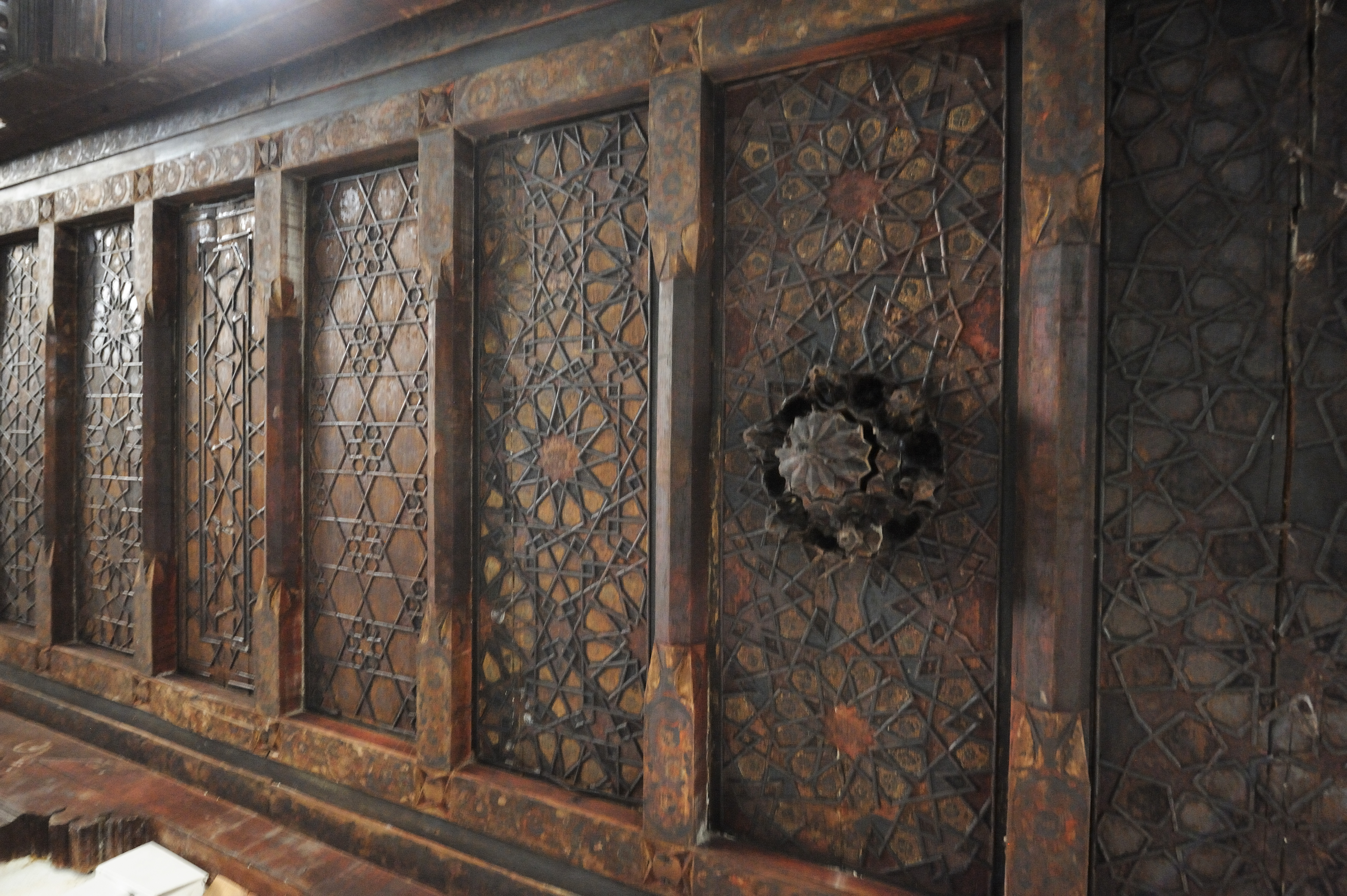
Adana Hasan Ağa mosque – Woodwork under balcony

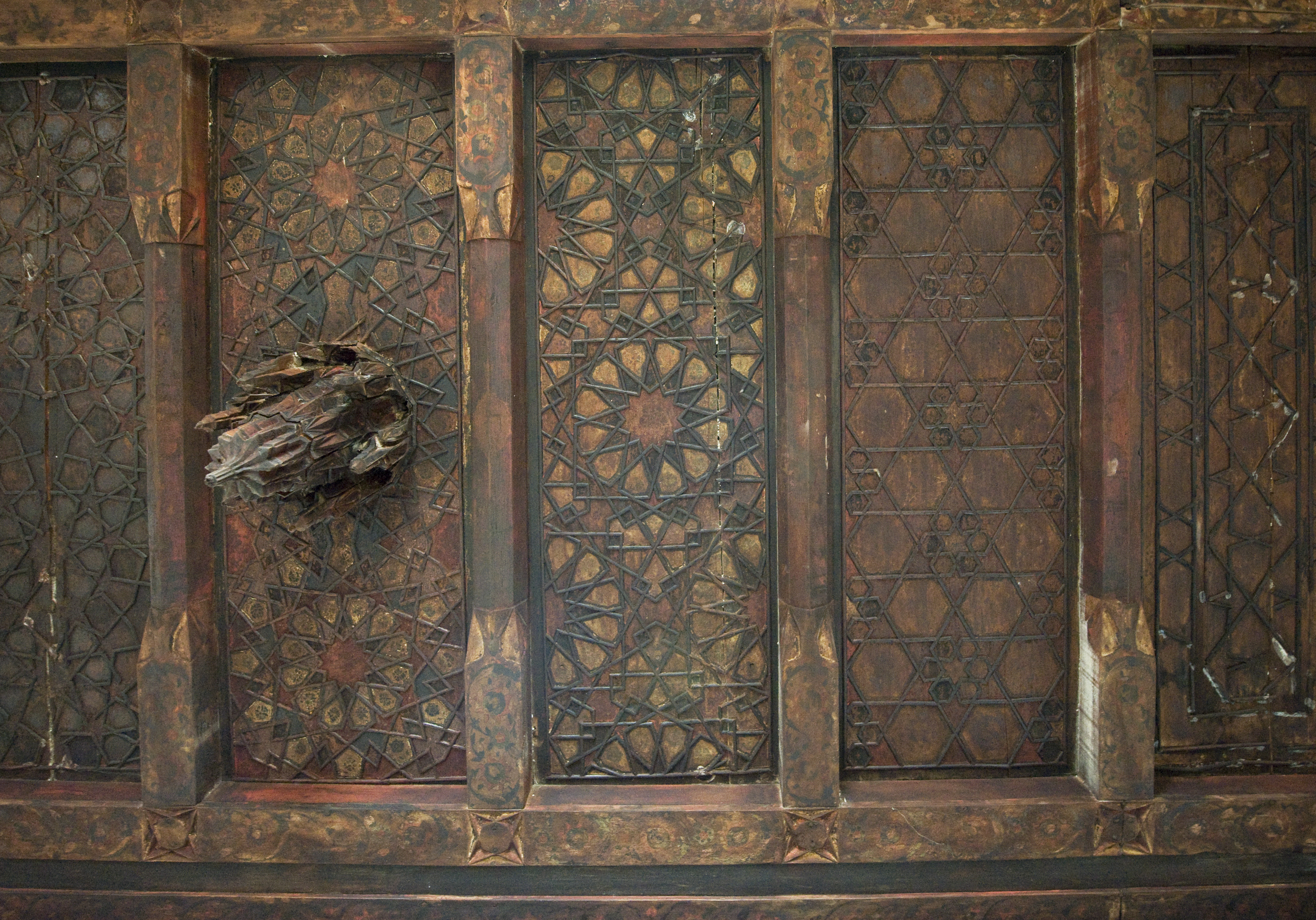
Adana Hasan Ağa mosque – Woodwork under balcony

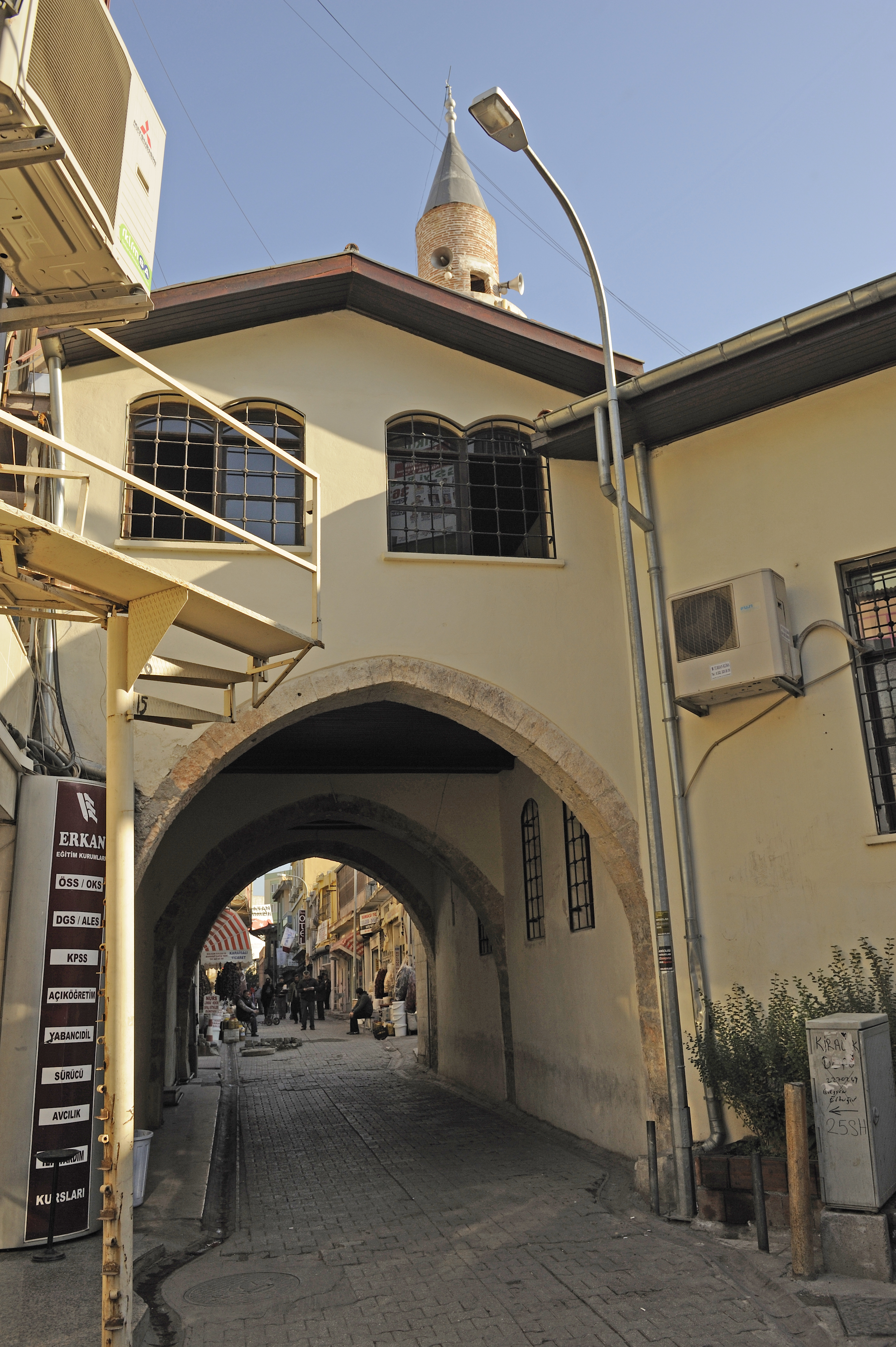
Adana Tahtalı Cami – From west

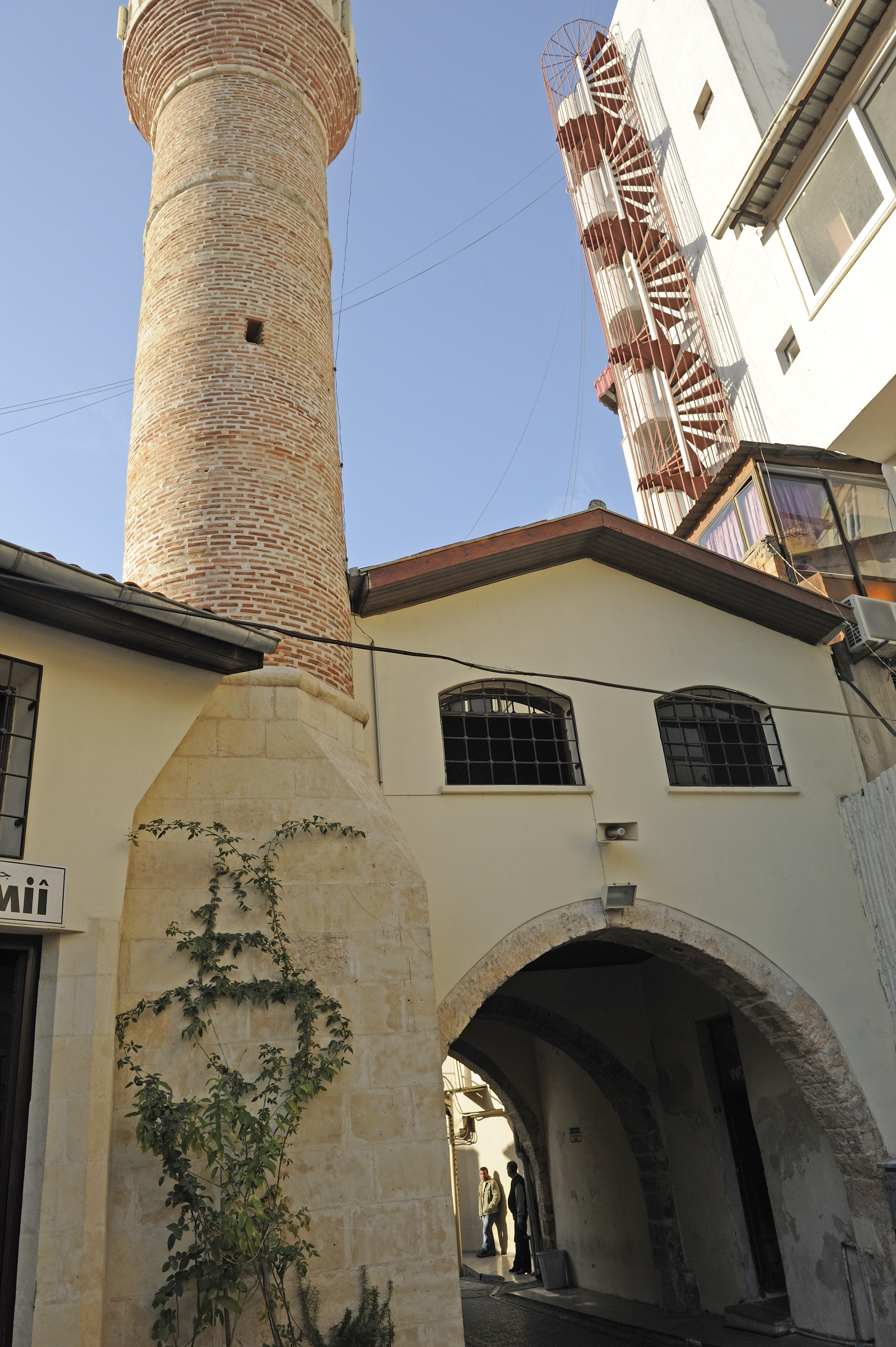
Adana Tahtalı Cami – From east

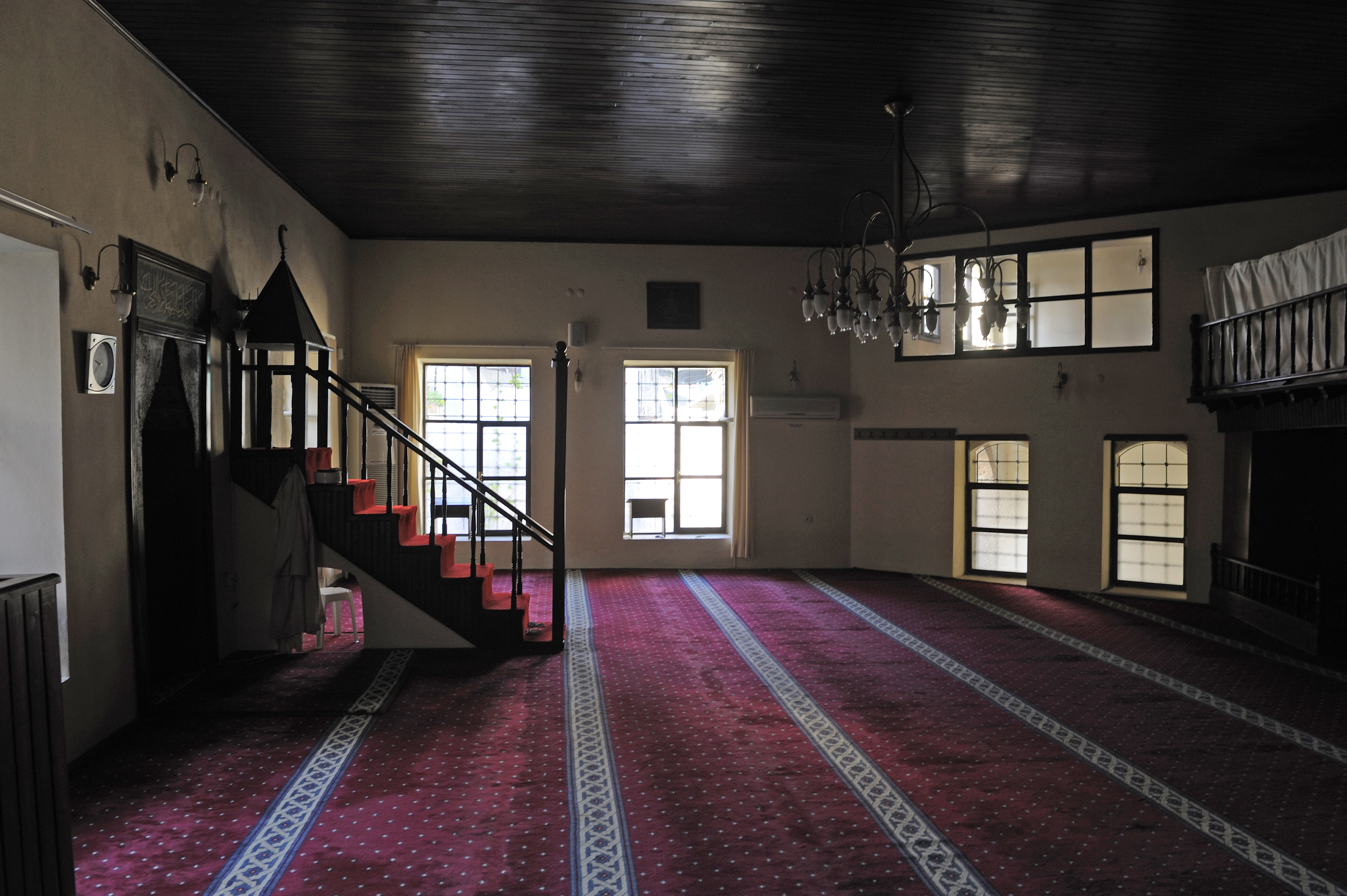
Adana Tahtalı Cami – Interior

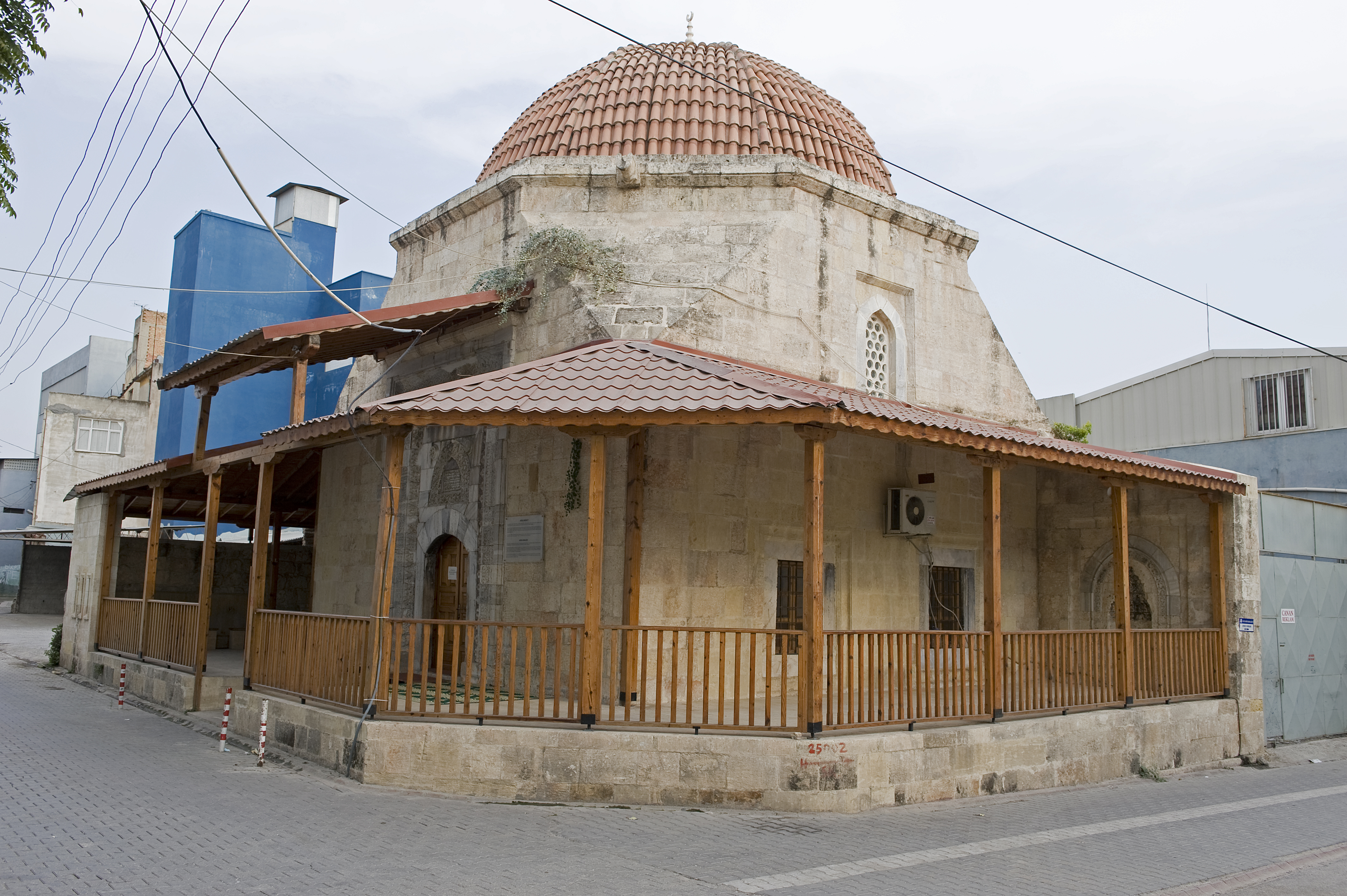
Adana Ağca Mescit – Exterior

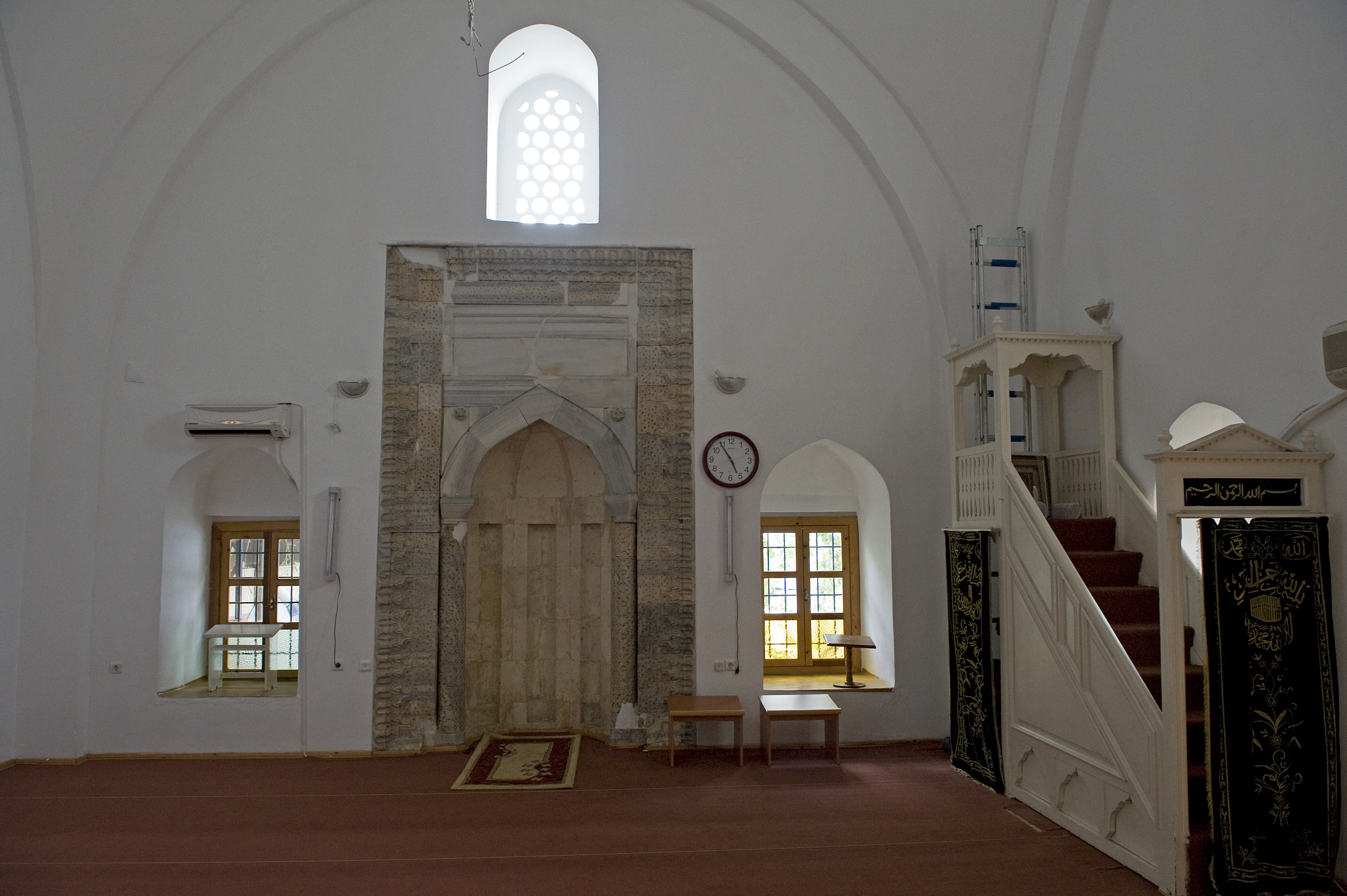
Adana Ağca Mescit – Interior

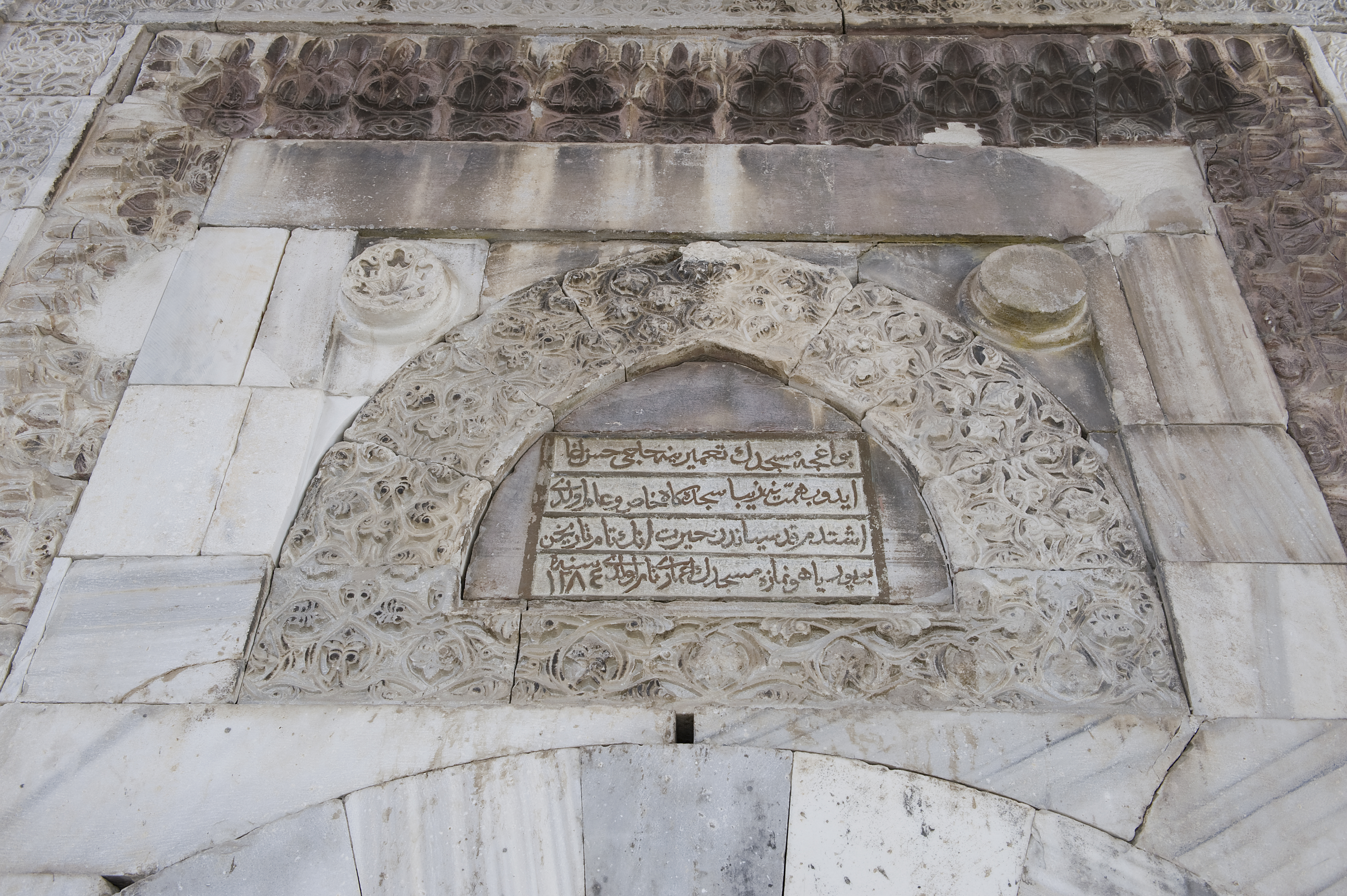
Adana Ağca Mescit – Decorative stonework

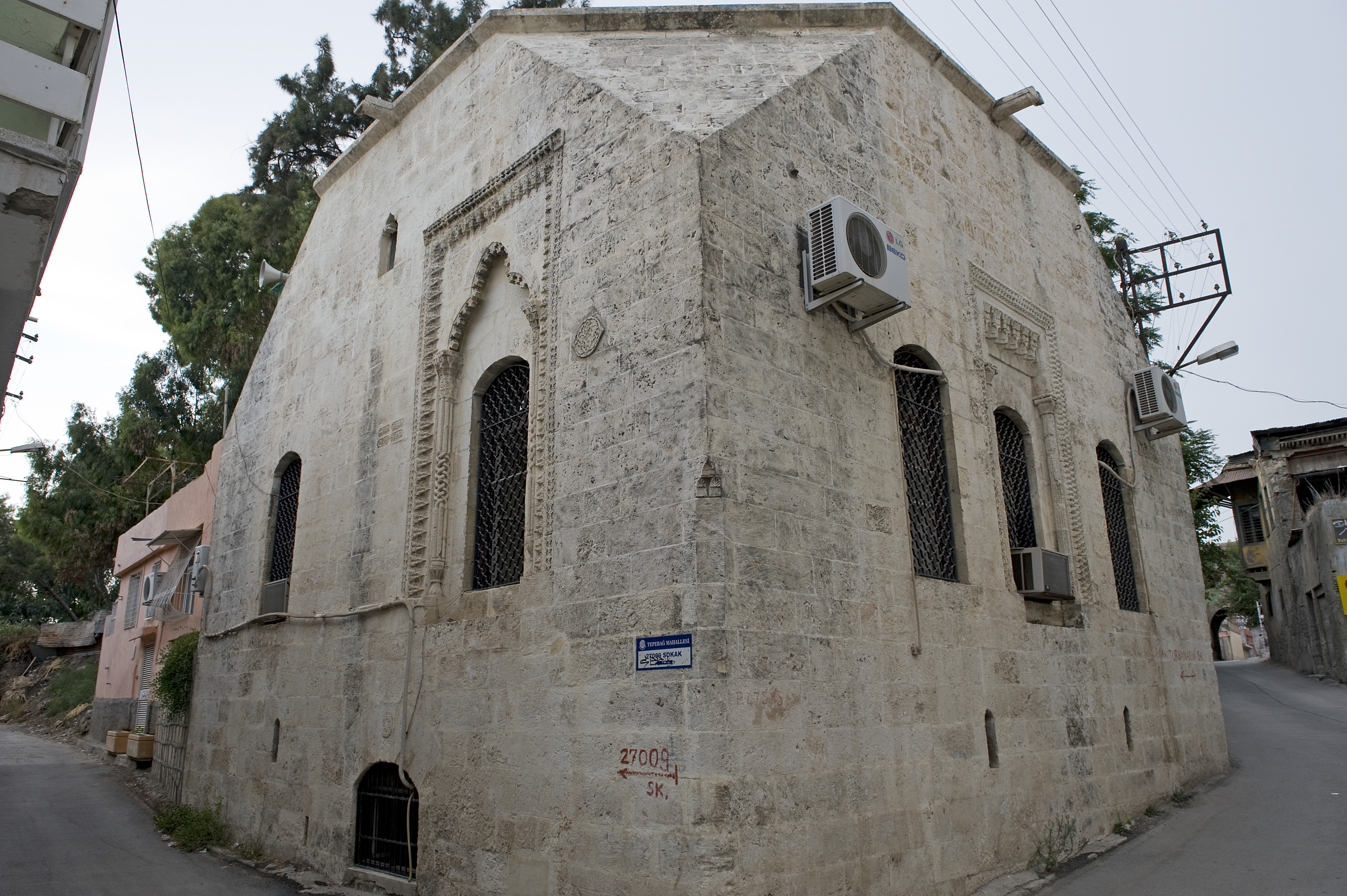
Adana Yesil Mescit – Exterior

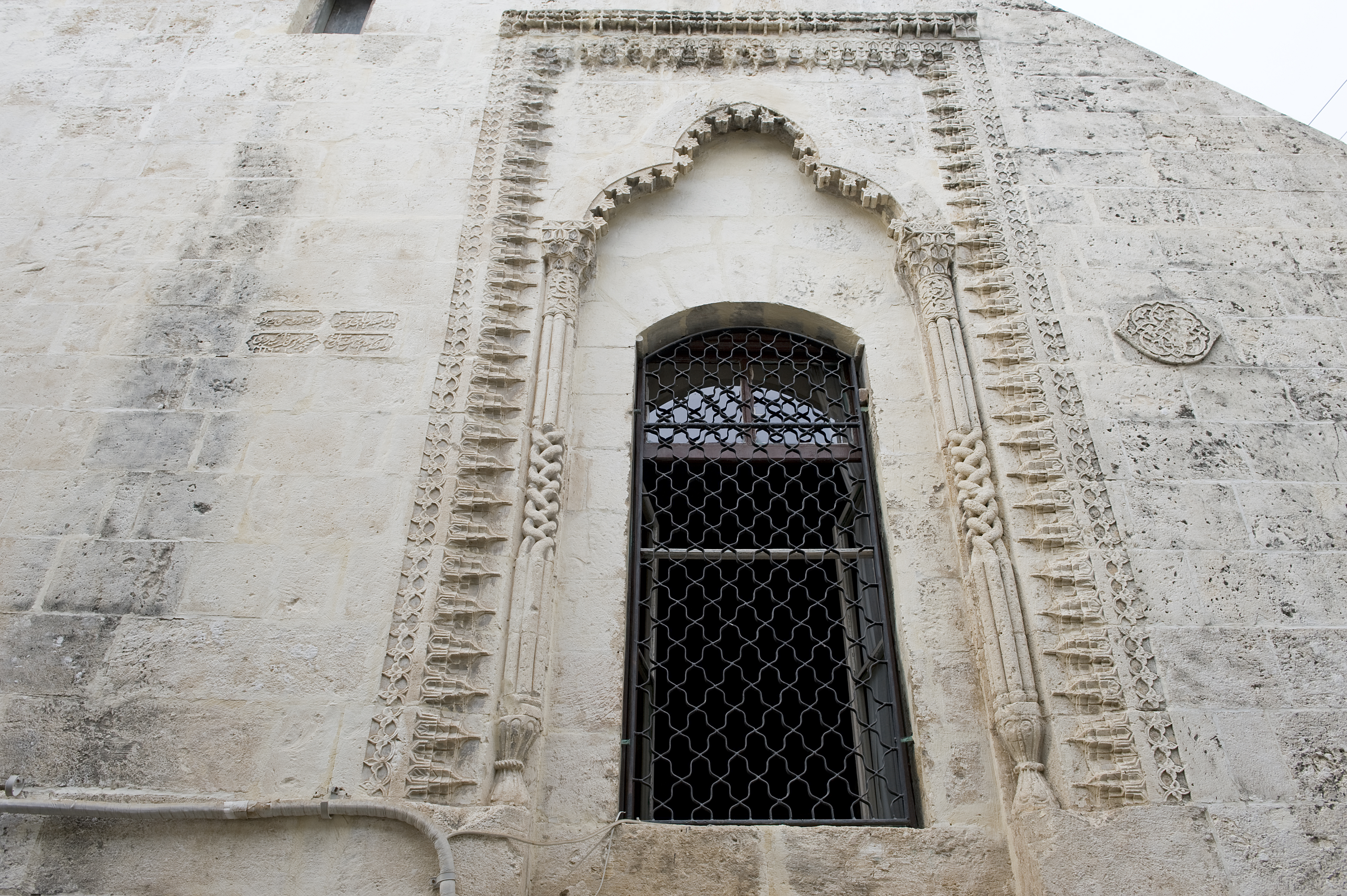
Adana Yesil Mescit – Window decoration

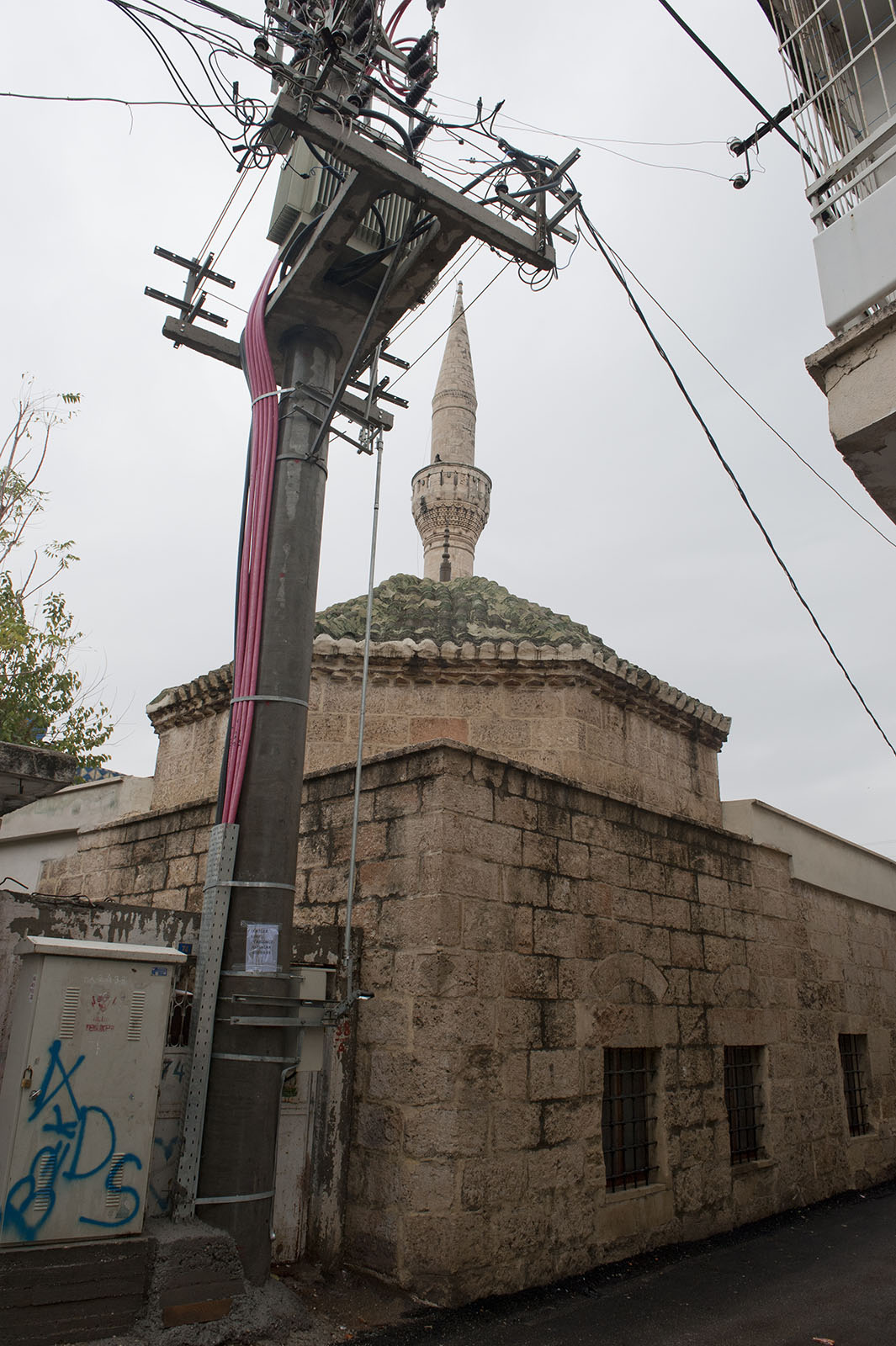
Adana Alidede Mosque – Exterior

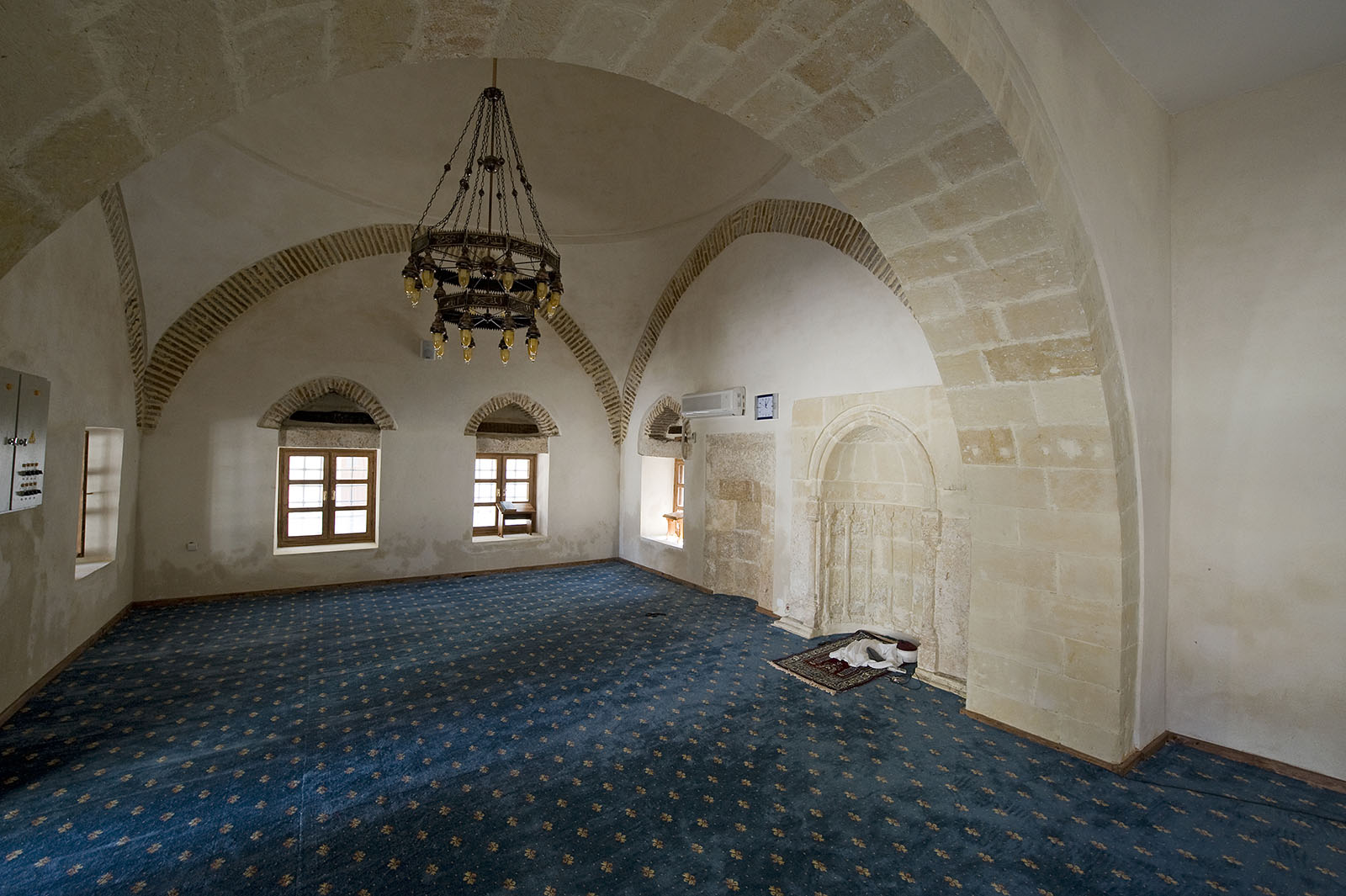
Adana Alidede Mosque – Interior

== See also ==
- List of people from Adana
- List of twin towns and sister cities in Turkey
- List of mayors of Adana
- Çukurova
- Cilicia
