= Yağ Cami =

Historical mosque in Adana, Turkey

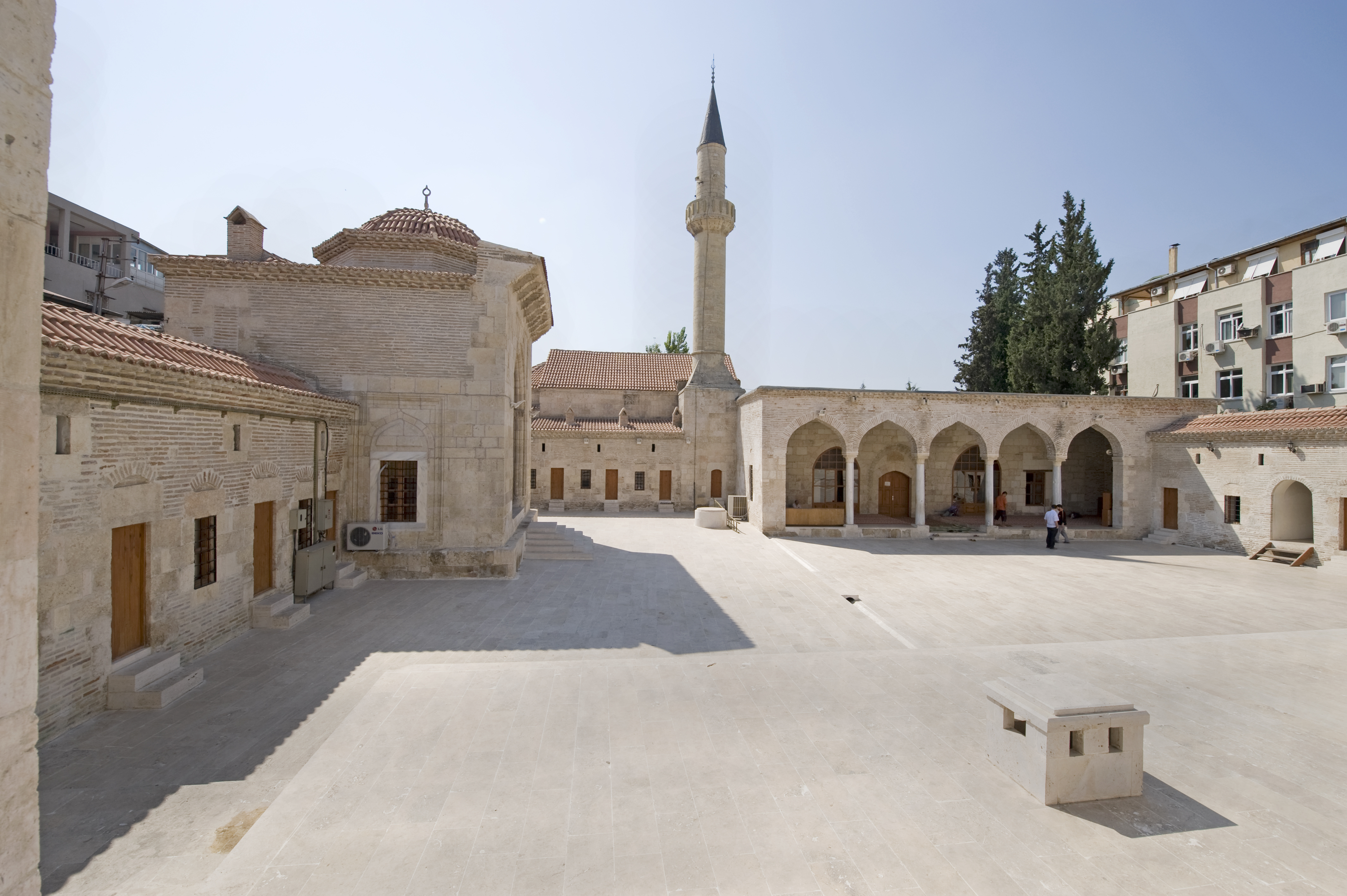

Religion
- Affiliation: Islam
- District: Seyhan Müftülüğü
- Rite: Sunni
- Year consecrated: late 14th century
- Status: Active

Location
- Location: Adana, Turkey
- Interactive map of Yağ Cami
- Coordinates: 36°59′01″N 35°19′37″E

Architecture
- Type: Armenian Apostolic Church
- Completed: 2nd half of the 13th century (as Surp Hagop Church)

Yağ Cami or Oil Mosque is a historical mosque located in the old town of Adana, Turkey which was originally built as the Surp Hagop Armenian Apostolic Church at the second half of the 13th century during the Armenian Kingdom of Cilicia. It was converted into a mosque in c. 1501 by the Ramazanoğlu Bey Şihabeddin Ahmed, just after taking over the city. It is the oldest mosque in the city and later on formed part of the külliye that also includes a madrasah.

== History ==
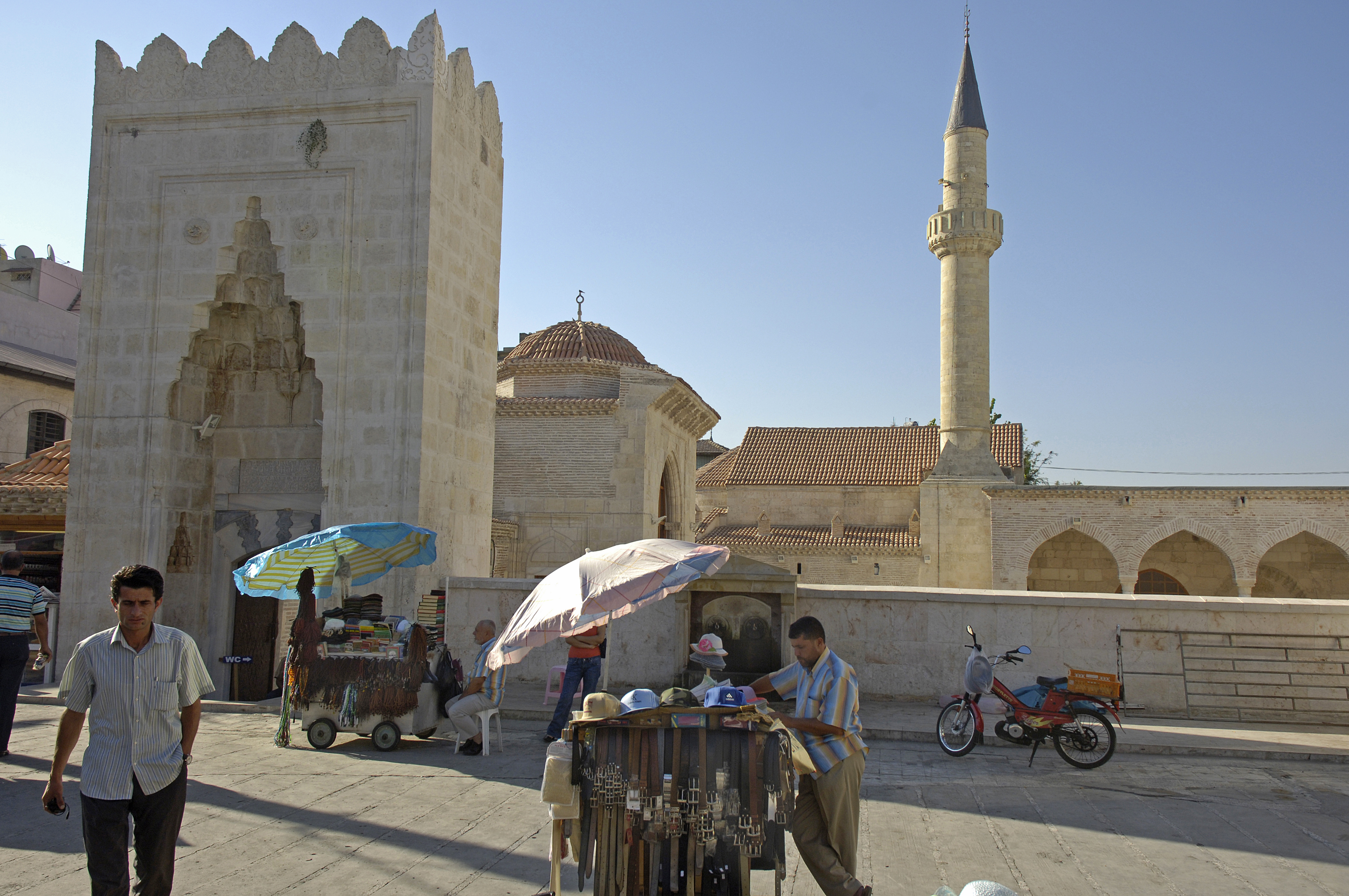
Main entrance

Surp Hagop Church was built at the second half of 13th century as an Armenian Apostolic Church, after Armenian re-gaining of the city from the Byzantine Empire. Adana was ceded to the Mamluk Sultanate in 1359 and in the next decades, many Turkish families moved to the city. To practice their religious duties, the church was converted into a mosque in around 1501 by the Ramazanoğlu Bey Şihabeddin Ahmed and was renamed the Grand Mosque (tr=Ulu Camii). From early 16th century, the mosque was known as Eski mosque (English: Old mosque), after the construction of the larger Ulu Camii. The mosque was renovated in 1501 by Gıyâseddîn Halil Bey. Later, his son Piri Mehmet Paşa built its minaret in 1525 and its madrasah in 1558. From mid 19th century, the mosque became known with the current name, Yağ, which derived from Yağup; the Arabic version of the name Hagop.

== Architecture ==
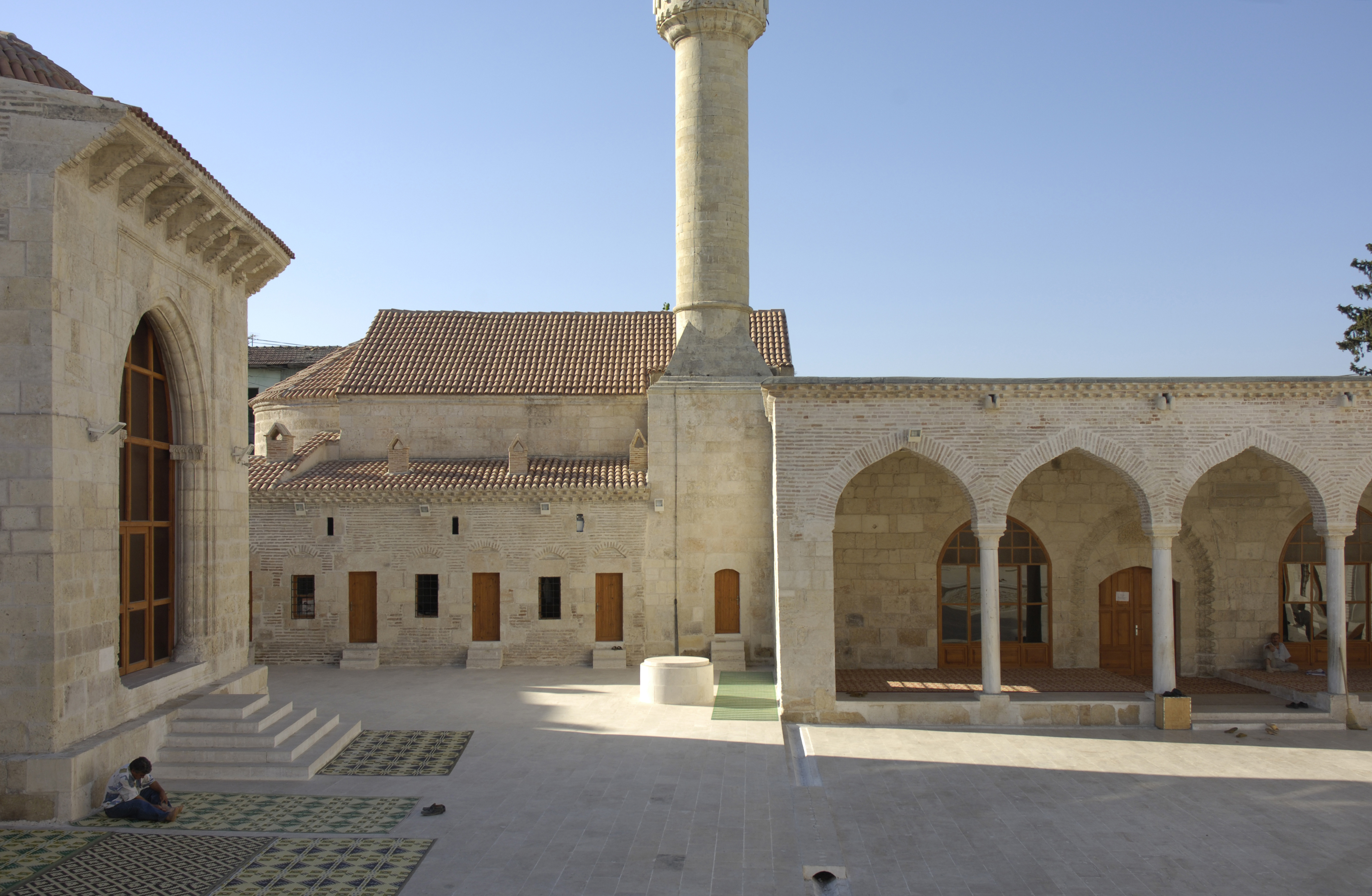
View from entrance

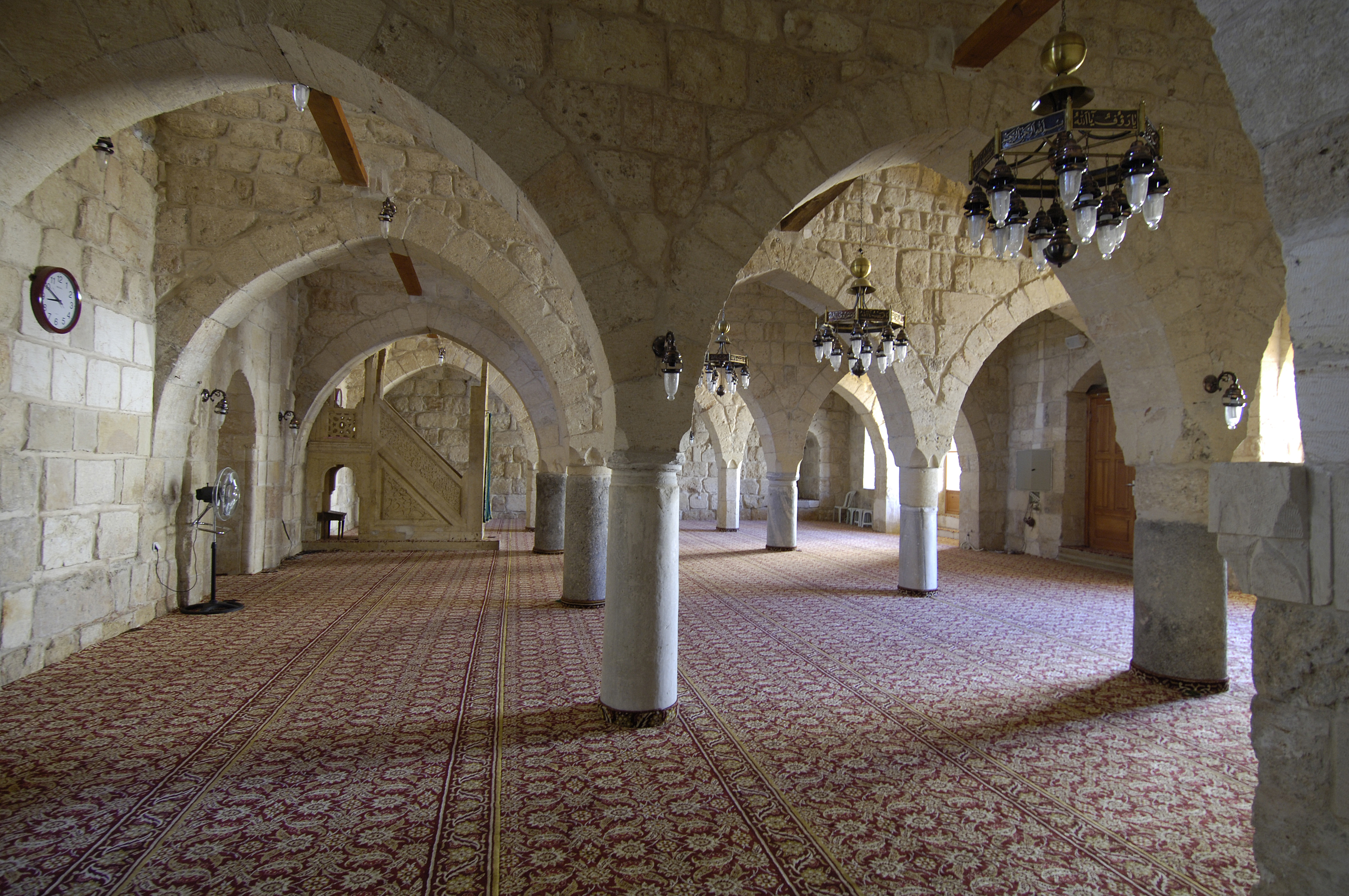
Mosque interior

=== Mosque ===
The praying area has a rectangular shape and it is split into five naves with four rows of columns. The mihrab of the mosques is the apsis that remained from former church. The gate of the mosques is of yellow and black colored stone and is an important work of art.

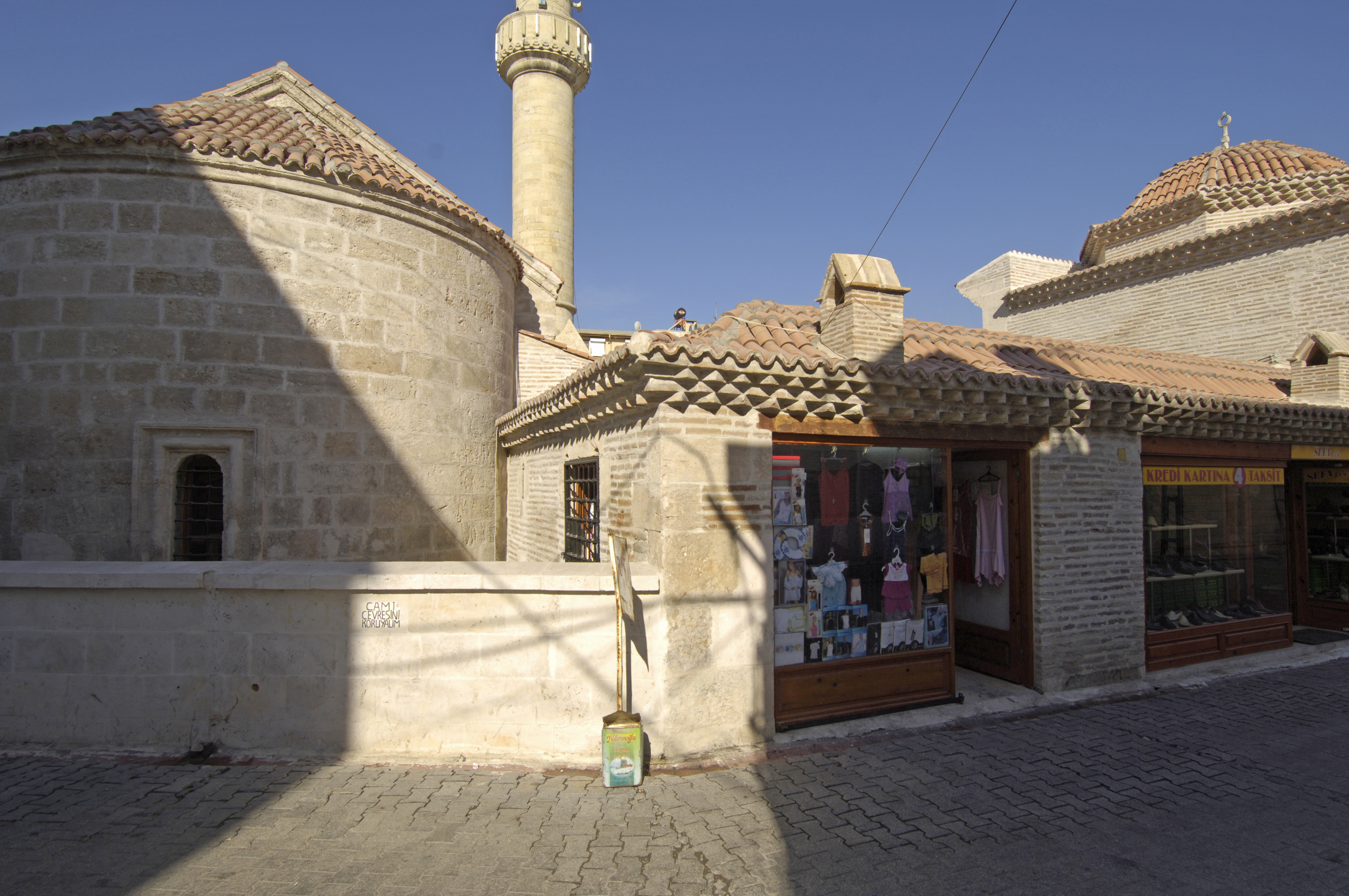
Mosque exterior

=== Madrasah ===
The medrese is located in the courtyard of the mosque. There are classrooms, cells (bedrooms) and a kitchen in the madrasah. Classrooms are covered with domes and cells have cradle arches. Arcades in front of the cells are great samples of wooden artwork.
