= Great Mosque of Adana =

Mosque in Adana, Turkey

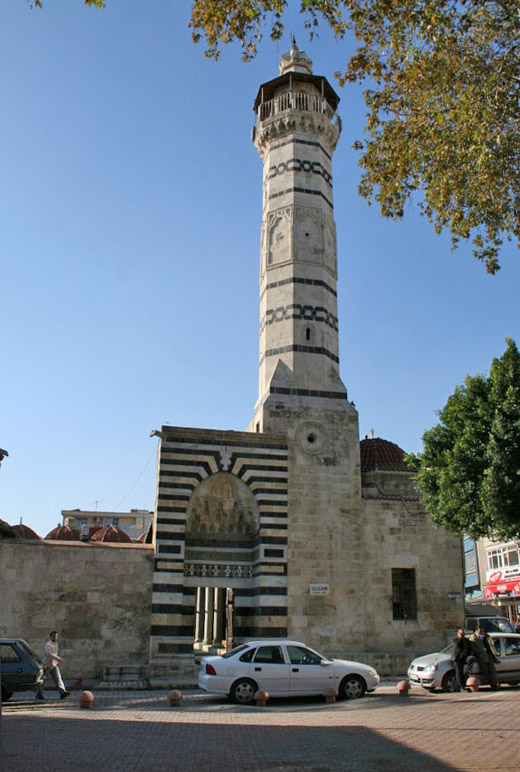

- Location of Adana within Turkey

Religion
- Affiliation: Islam
- Region: Mediterranean
- Status: Active

Location
- Location: Adana, Turkey
- Coordinates: 36°59′06″N 35°19′51″E

Architecture
- Type: Mosque
- Groundbreaking: 1513
- Completed: 1541
- Minaret: 1

The Great Mosque of Adana (Turkish: Adana Ulu Camii), also known as the Ramazanoglu Mosque (Turkish: Ramazanoğlu Camii), is a 16th century mosque in Adana, Turkey. It forms part of a complex (külliye) that includes a madrasah and a mausoleum (türbe). The complex is on Kızılay Street, next to Ramazanoğlu Hall.

== History ==
The construction of the mosque began in 1513 under Ramazanoğlu Halil Bey and was completed under his son and successor, Piri Mehmet Paşa, in 1541. For 450 years, until the construction of the Sabancı Merkez Camii, the mosque was the largest in Adana. It was damaged in the 1998 Adana–Ceyhan earthquake, and the restoration by the General Directorate of Foundations (Vakıflar Genel Müdürlüğü) was completed in 2004.

== The mosque ==
The building features Mamluk, Seljuk, and Ottoman architectural design elements. The western entrance is older than the main building and differs in style from the part constructed by Ramazanoğlu Halil Bey. The conical stalactite roof, which rises step by step above the entrance has Seljukid architectural features. It indicates that the Ramadanids, a small beylik (emirate) in the early 16th century, initially built a small mosque and later constructed the main building beside it as the beylik expanded and the small mosque was no longer sufficient.

The mosque, as a whole, has a rectangular plan with dimensions of 34.5 by 32.5 metres (113 ft × 107 ft). The courtyard is entered through large gates on the west and the east sides. The northern section of the courtyard is covered with a wooden roof supported on pillars and thus can serve as an extension to the prayer hall and as an outdoor area for praying in summer. At the east end of the courtyard, the entrance at the side of the main hall is decorated with black and white marble panels. The semi-pointed arches are decorated with stalactite and flower motifs.

The main prayer hall occupies the width of the rectangular plan and consists of two aisles of five bays separated by columns supporting semi-pointed arches. The mihrab is decorated with Iznik tiles and framed by black marble panels. Iznik tiles, which also adorn the qibla wall, were added after 1552.

The minaret, near the eastern entrance to the courtyard, has a covered balcony and shows a Mamluk influence. The exterior of the minaret is decorated with stone of two different colors.

== Madrasah ==
The madrasah of the mosque is on the east side of the mosque and is described in early documents as the 'Old Madrasah.'

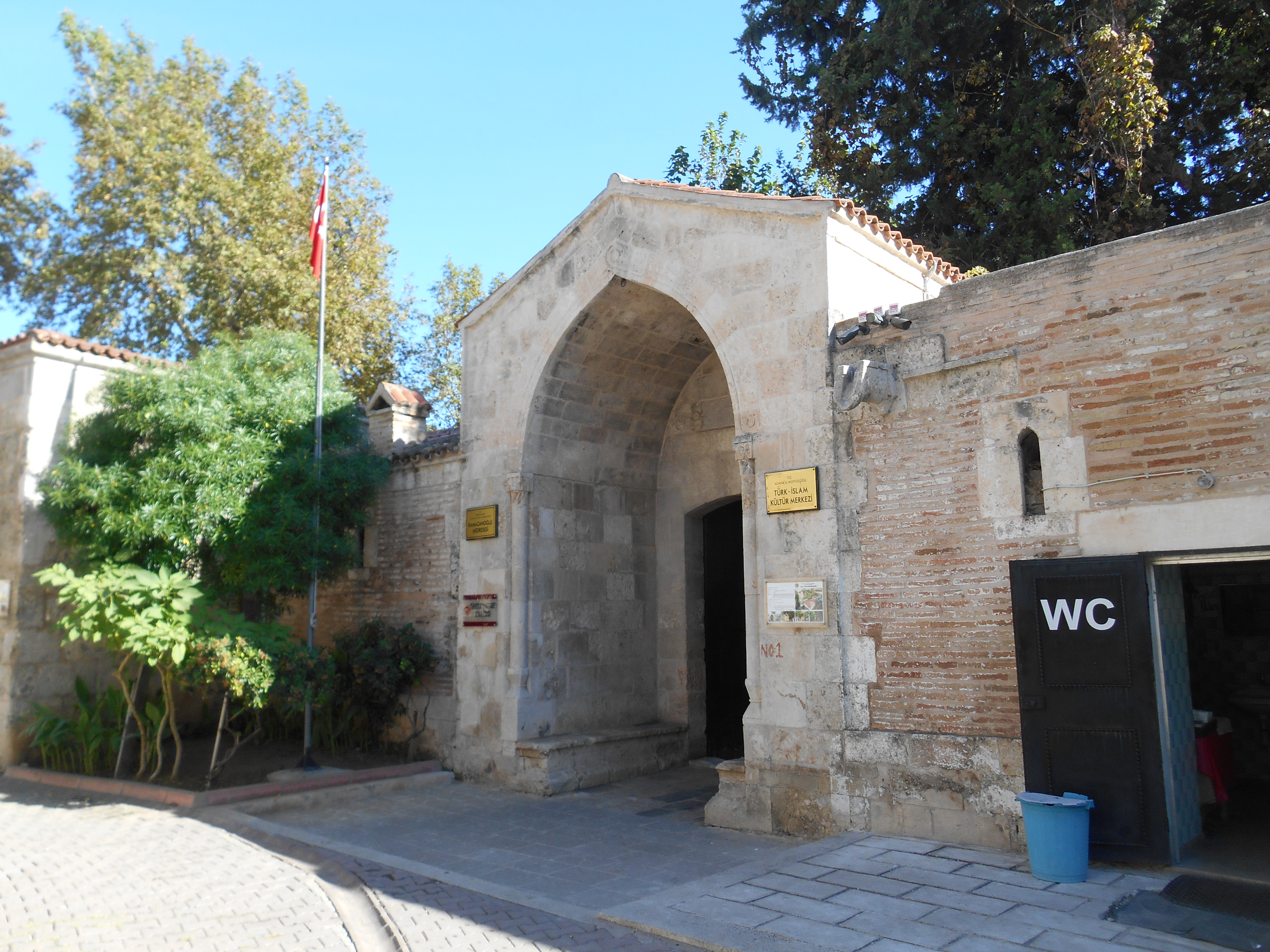
The gate

There are dervish cells on the east, west, and south sides of the nearly square courtyard, whose sides measure 23 m (75 ft). The main classroom (divanhane) is covered on the courtyard's north side, with two back-to-back domes. The outer length of the Madrasah from east to west is 32.8 metres (108 ft).

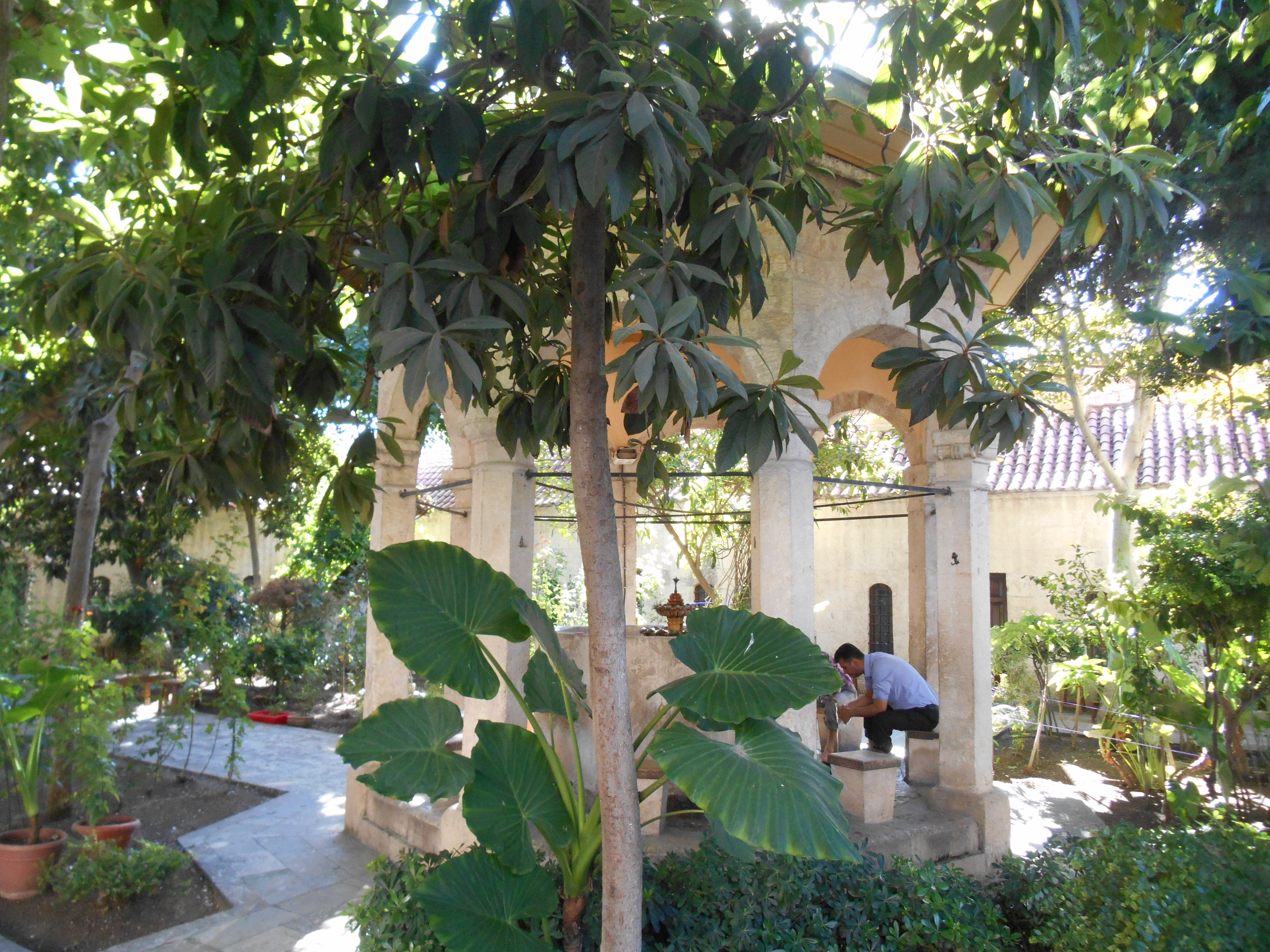
Courtyard

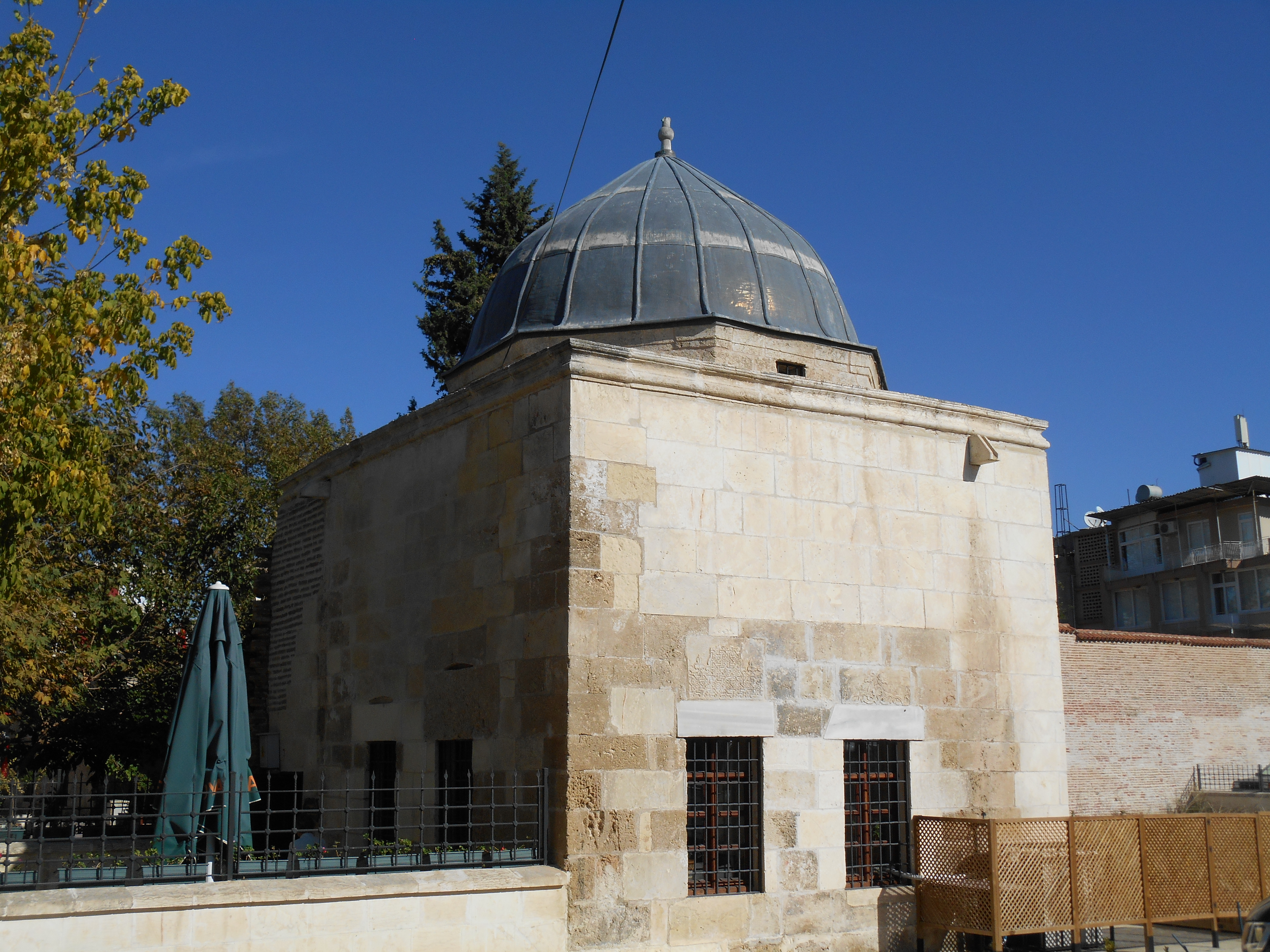
Praying area

The rear walls of the east wing, the chimney, and the north part of the classroom are made of brick; the rest of the madrasah is made of white stone. Although the inner walls of the cells are coated with plaster, the outer surfaces are not.

The design of the mosque's classroom as a back-to-back two-domed space and the U-shape lineup of the dervish cells around the courtyard distinguishes the mosque's madrasa from Seljukid and Ottoman madrasas. Being the oldest among the Ramazanoğlu madrasah, another distinctive feature, similar to the Yağ Camii madrasah, is the stone walls of the classroom front and the brick walls of the rear. The geometric decorations on the west window of the classroom are the same as those of the arches at the mosque's entrance.

=== Ornamentation ===
The portal niche of the madrasah is decorated with beveled molding. The surrounding of the inscription is decorated with palmettes (fan-shaped glyphs) and small badges. The second of the two rectangular windows on the hall's east and west walls is framed with geometrically patterned molding that forms the intersection of a thread line with a checker and six-armed stars with a flower with six leaves at the center. The ornaments of the window on the east wall are not completed.

=== Inscription and chronogram ===
The only inscription on the madrasah is the two lines of thuluth script on the crown gate. The text reads:

"This holy madrasah was built by the son of Halil Bey, Piri, in need of Allah's mercy, on the year nine forty-seven, in the middle of the month of Muharram, during the reign of the greatest and the most eminent Shah Sultan Süleyman – Allah last his estate – for the sake of Allah."

The chronogram indicates that the madrasah was completed in May 1540. Although the builder of the madrasah is known as Ramazanoğlu Piri Pasha, the architect is unknown.

== Mausoleum of the Ramadanids ==
The mausoleum (türbe) of the Ramadanids houses sarcophagi of Halil Bey and the sons of Piri Paşa, Mehmet Bey and Mustafa Bey.

Unlike most Seljuk mausoleums, the mosque's mausoleum is built east of the mosque and, although situated next to the mosque, is not integrated with it.

The sarcophagi are covered with 16th-century tiles. On the front side of the sarcophagi are inscriptions on the tiles—the inscriptions being written in the same type show that they were all written after March 1552.

Other than the mosque's mausoleum and the Yeşil Türbe in Bursa, there are no other examples of mausoleums covered with tiles. The design of the mosque is similar to those built in Central Asia.

=== Mausoleum outside the mosque complex ===
There is also a mausoleum south of the mosque that stands as an independent structure. It is hexagonal in plan and is covered with a high dome. Since there are no inscriptions on the sarcophagi, the occupants and the construction date are unknown. As it is only 2 m (6.6 ft) away from the mosque's mausoleum, it is thought that the sarcophagi may belong to members of the Ramadanid family. The mausoleum is built in the baroque style, dating from the end of the 18th century.

== Gallery ==
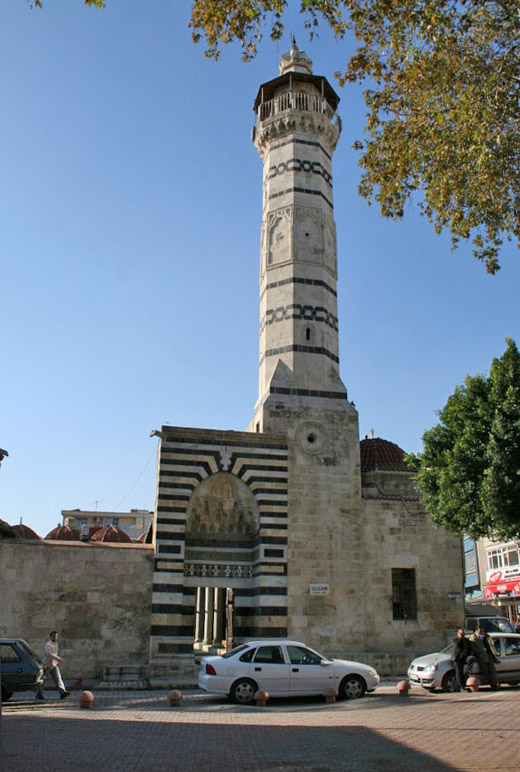
Eastern entrance and minaret

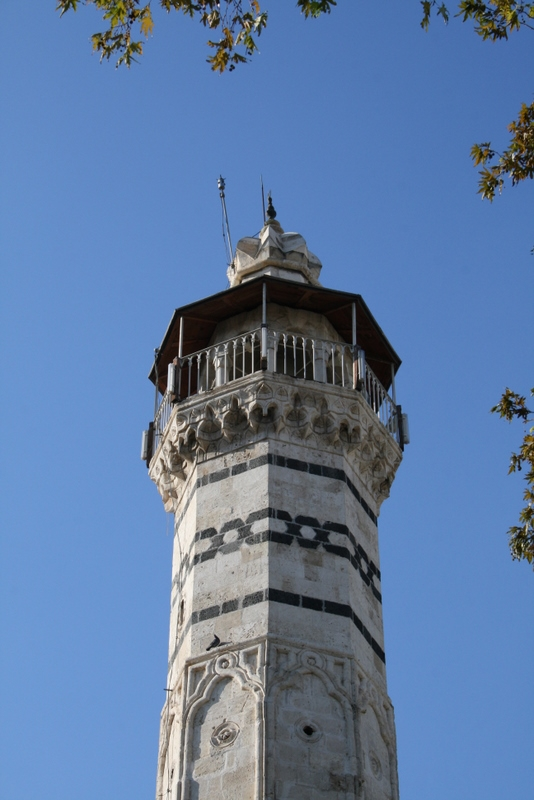
Minaret balcony

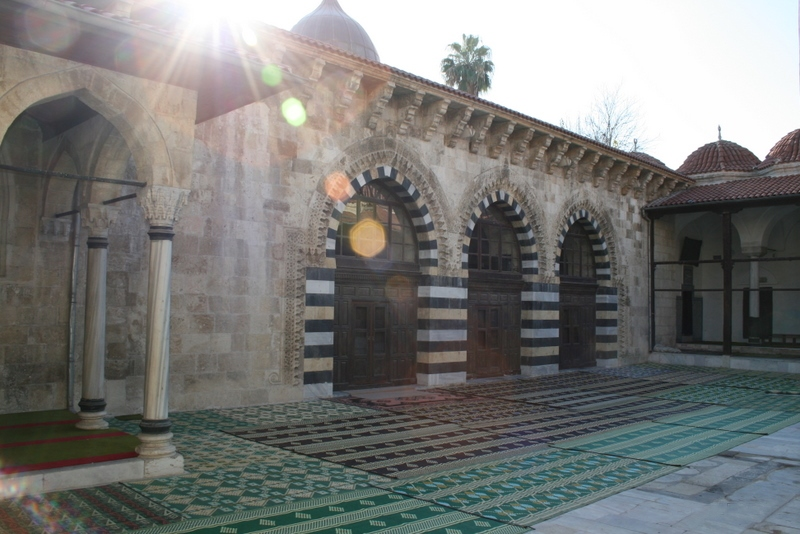
Interior courtyard

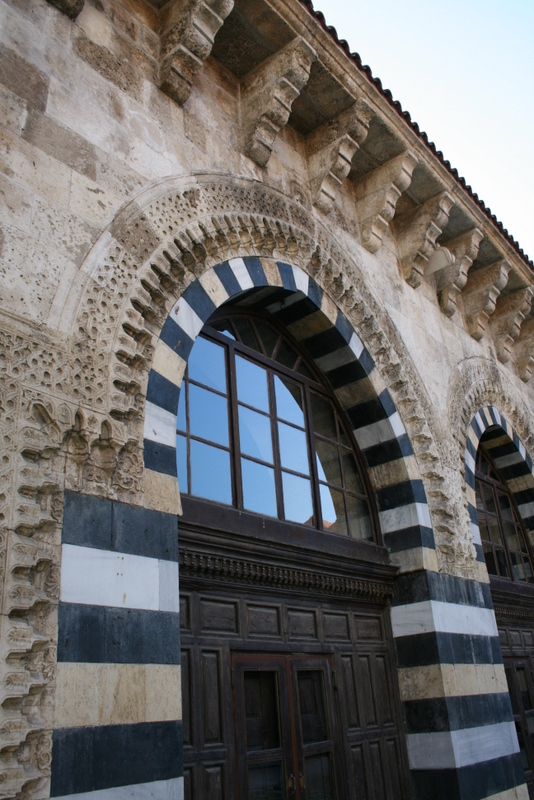
Entrance to the prayer hall

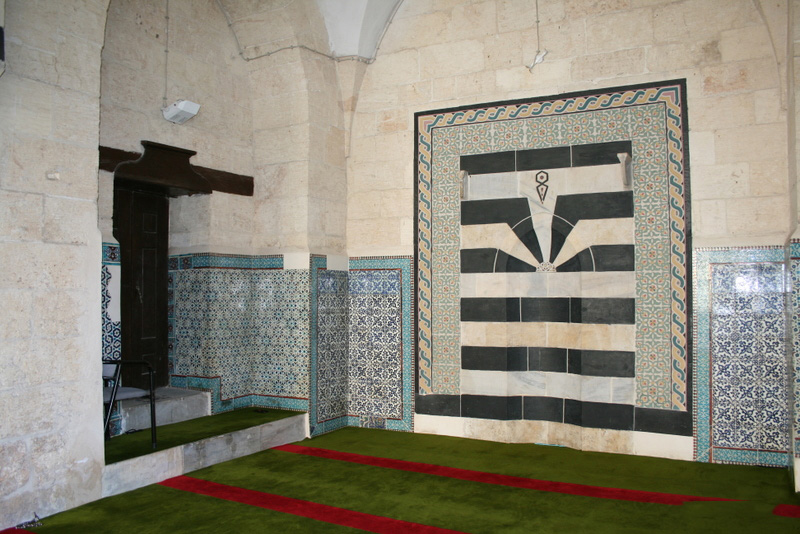
Interior view

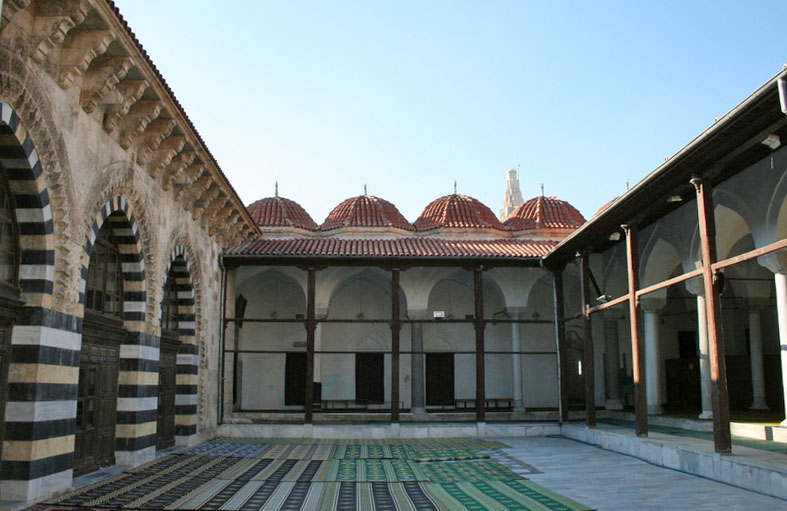
Courtyard

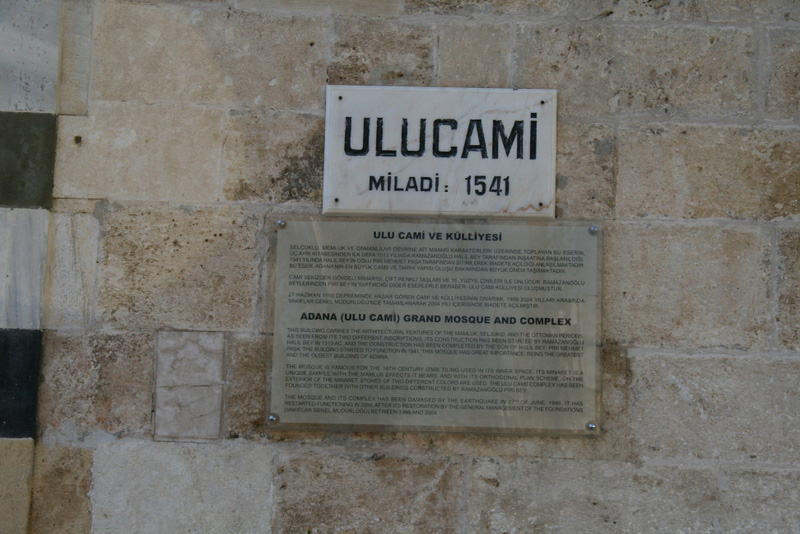
Wall notice

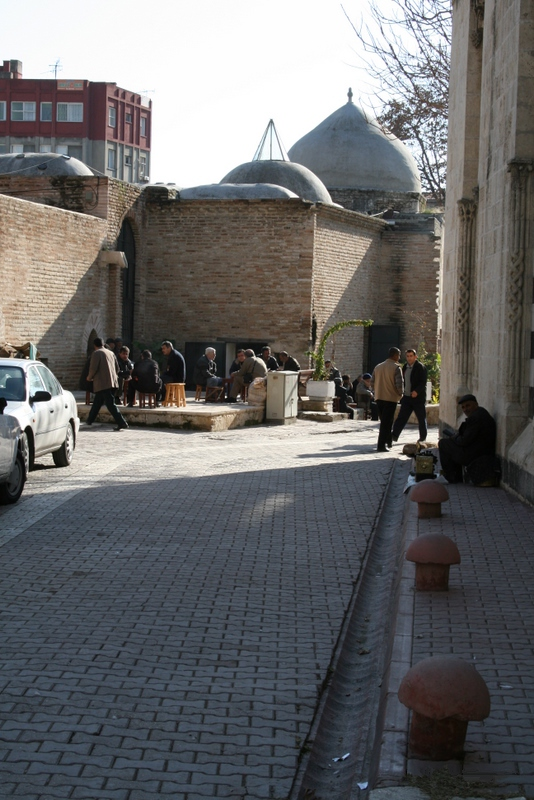
Exterior of complex

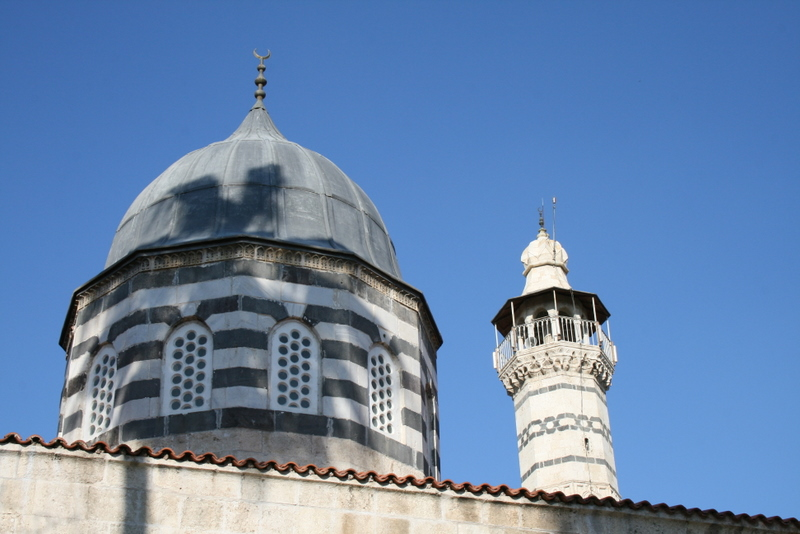
Main dome

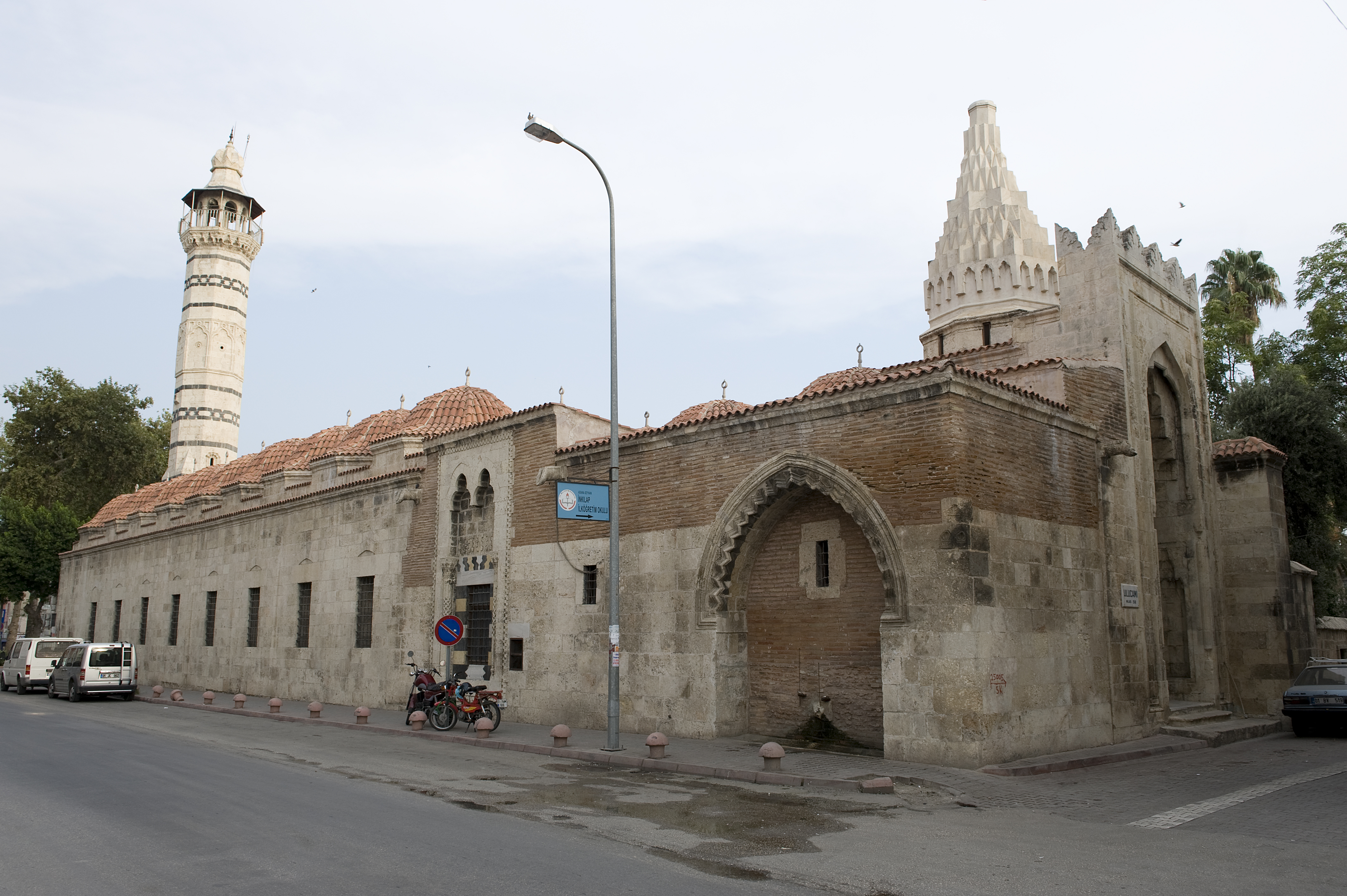
View from the street on the north side

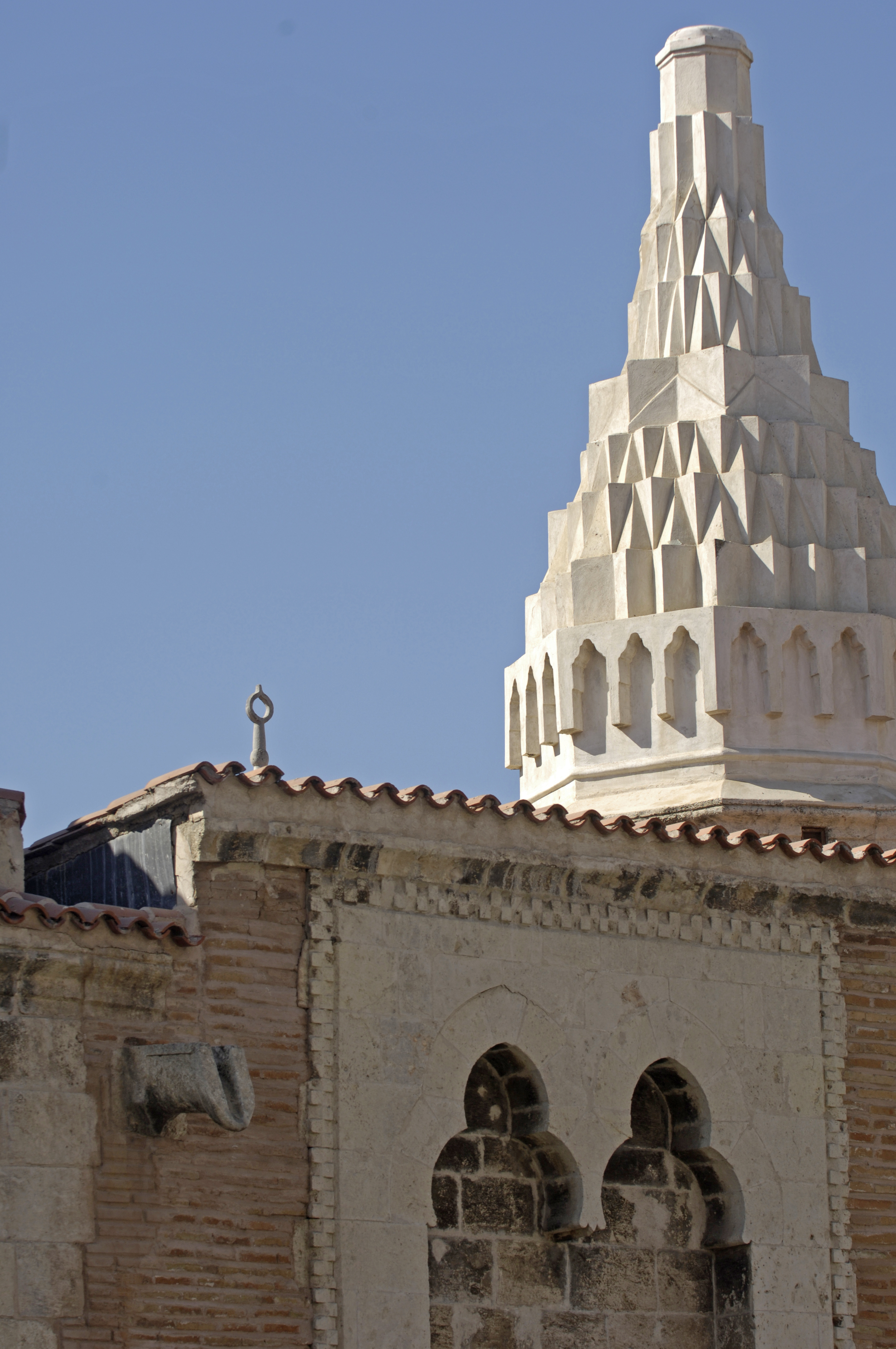
Dome in the west and top east entrance

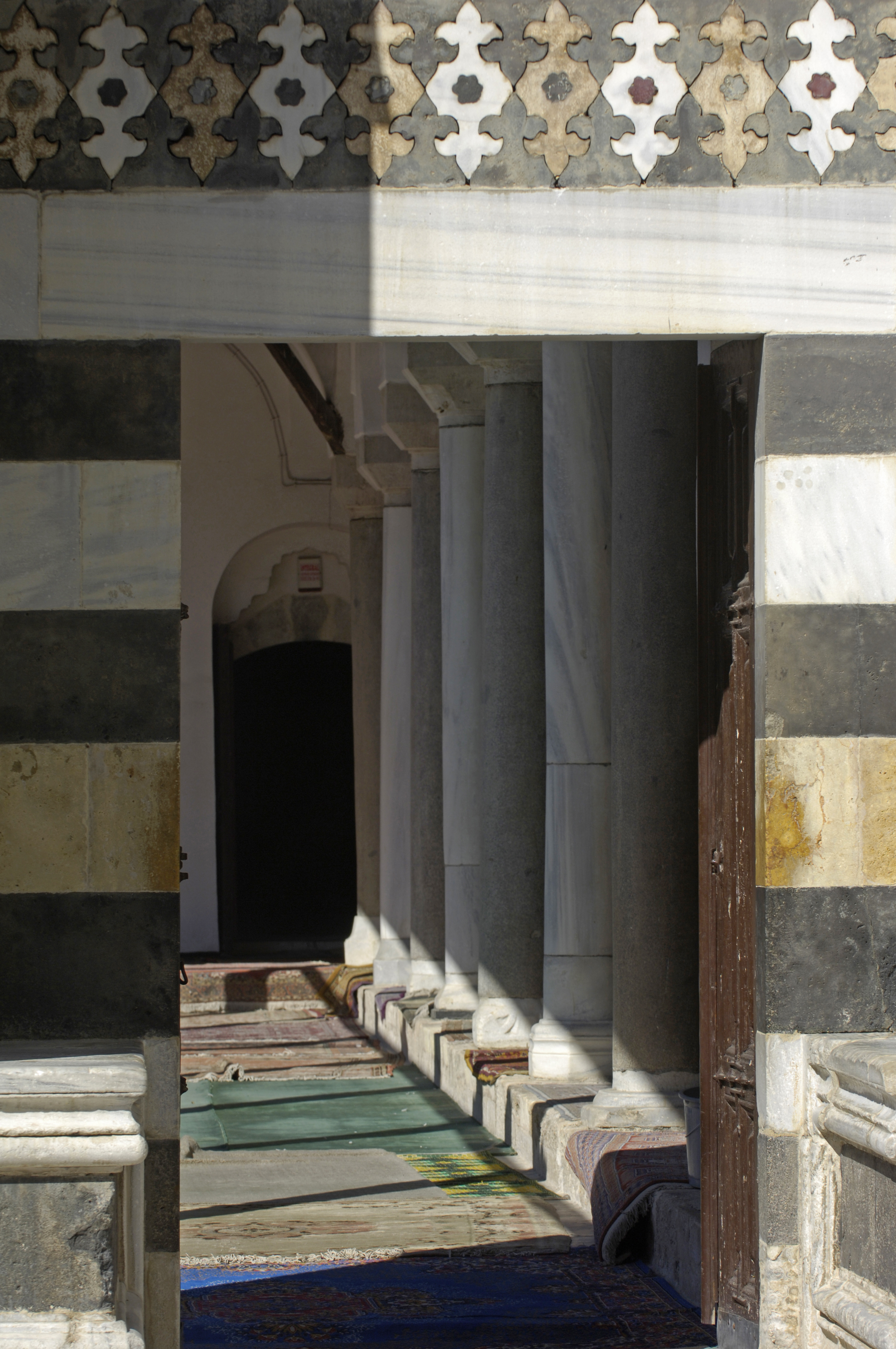
View into the courtyard

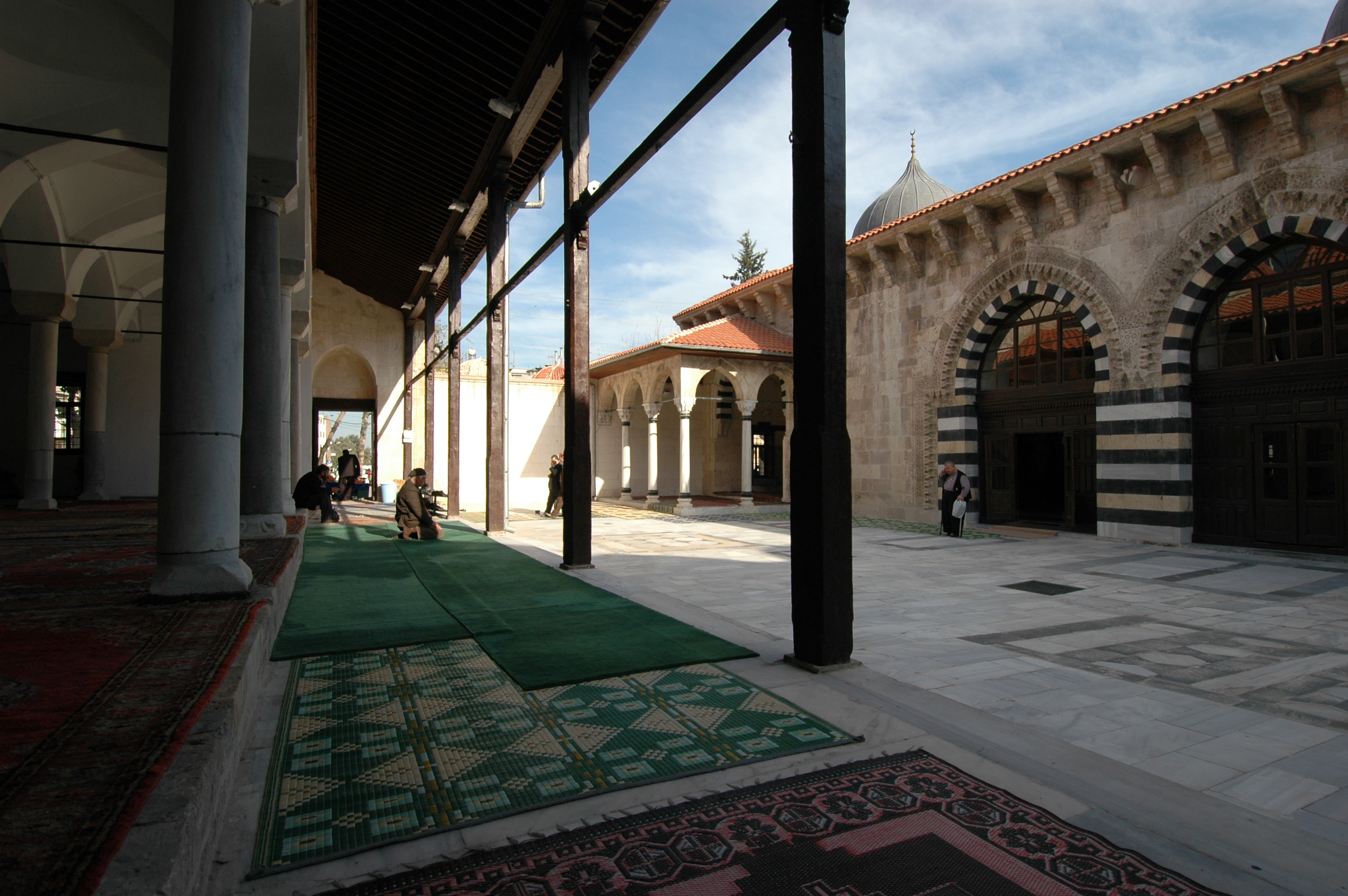
View into the courtyard

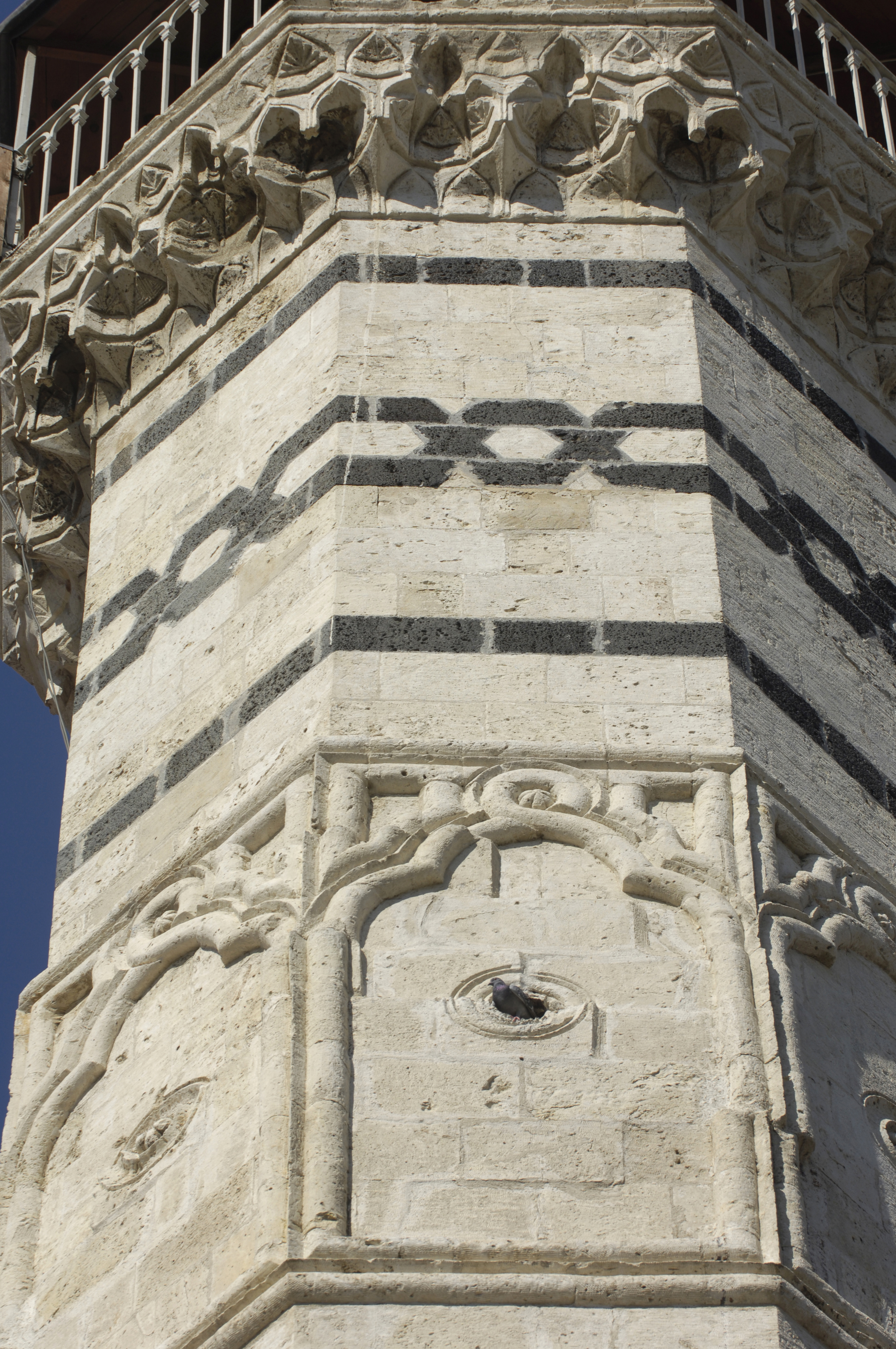
Part of the minaret

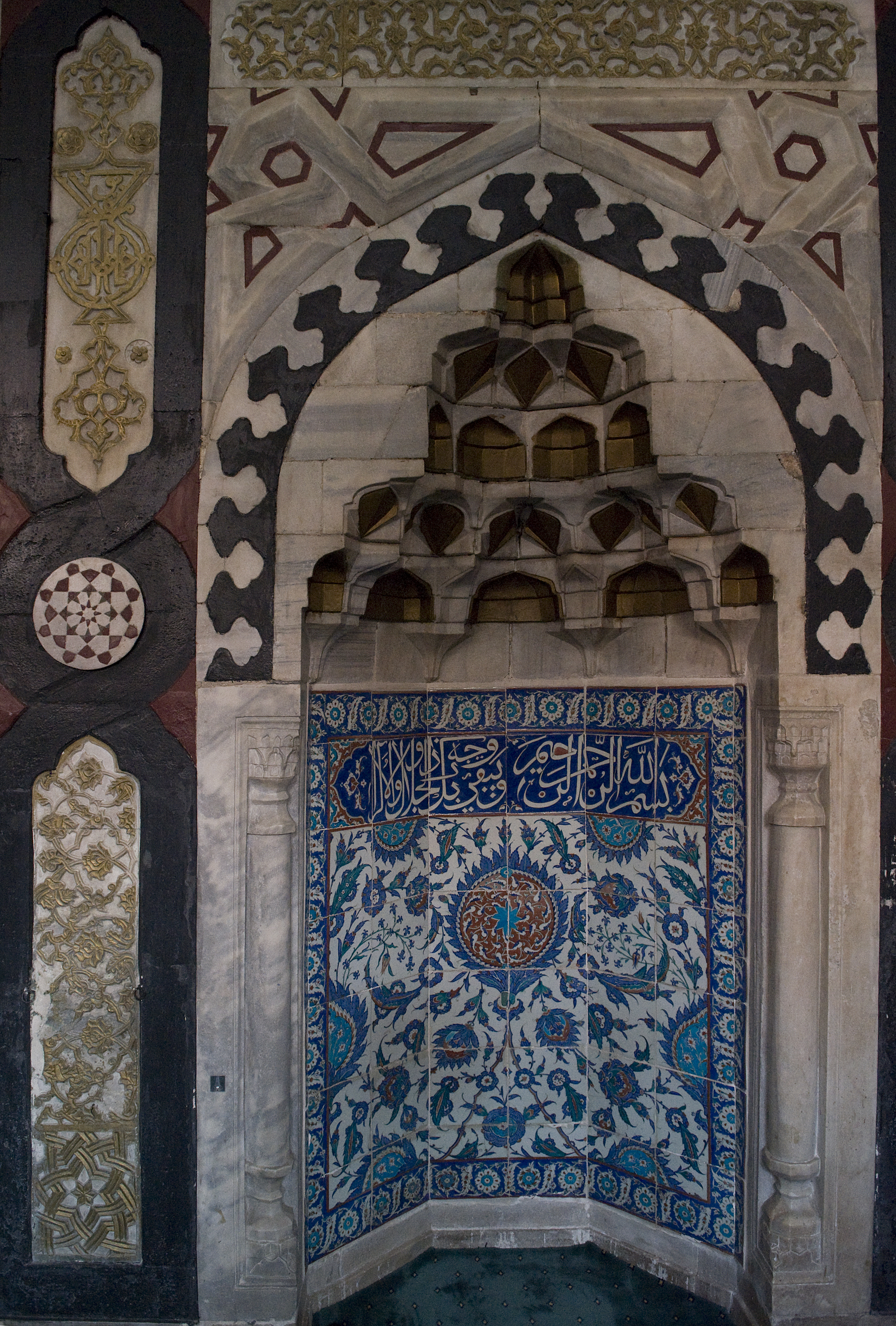
Mihrab

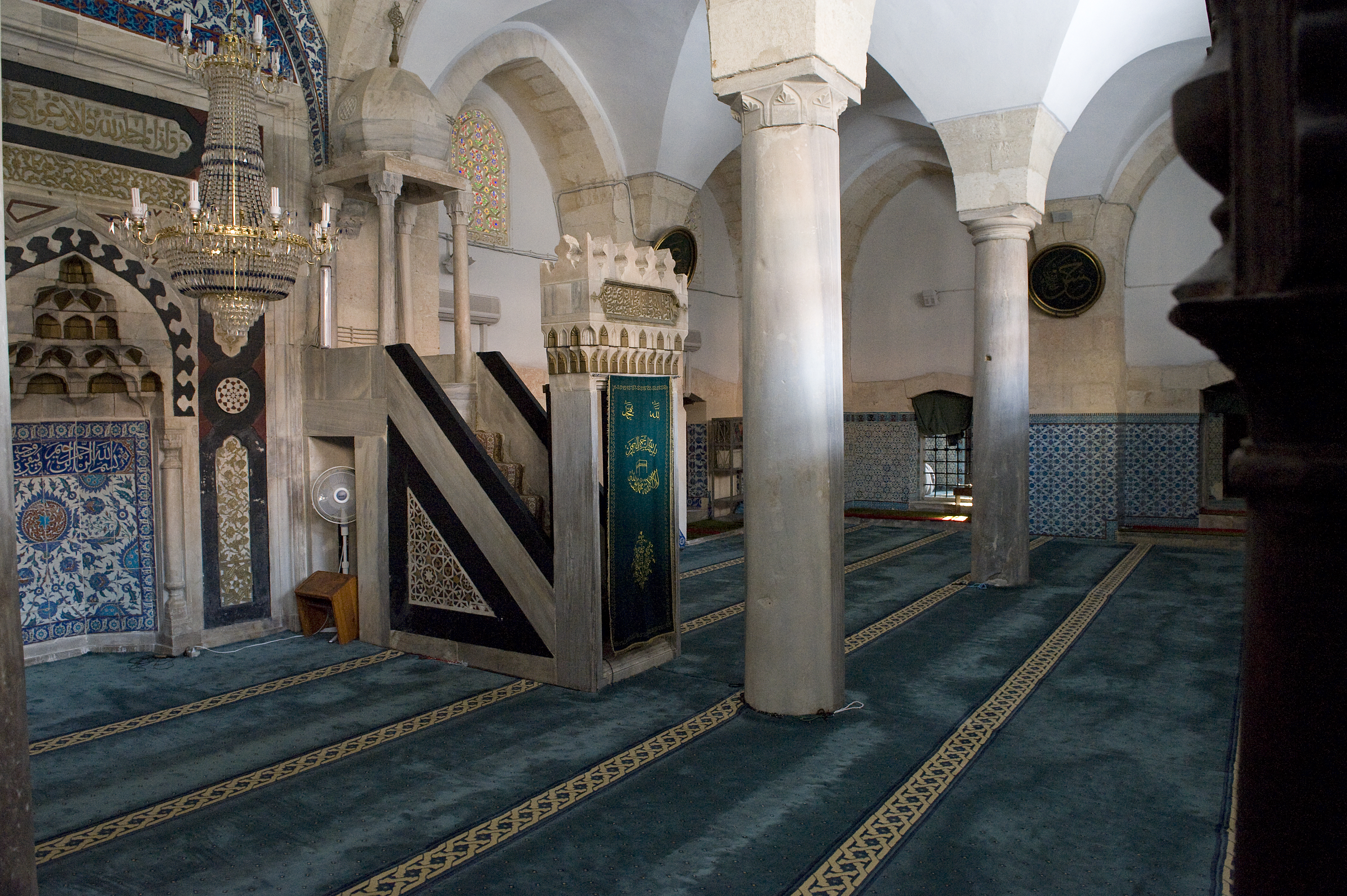
Interior with mihrab and minber

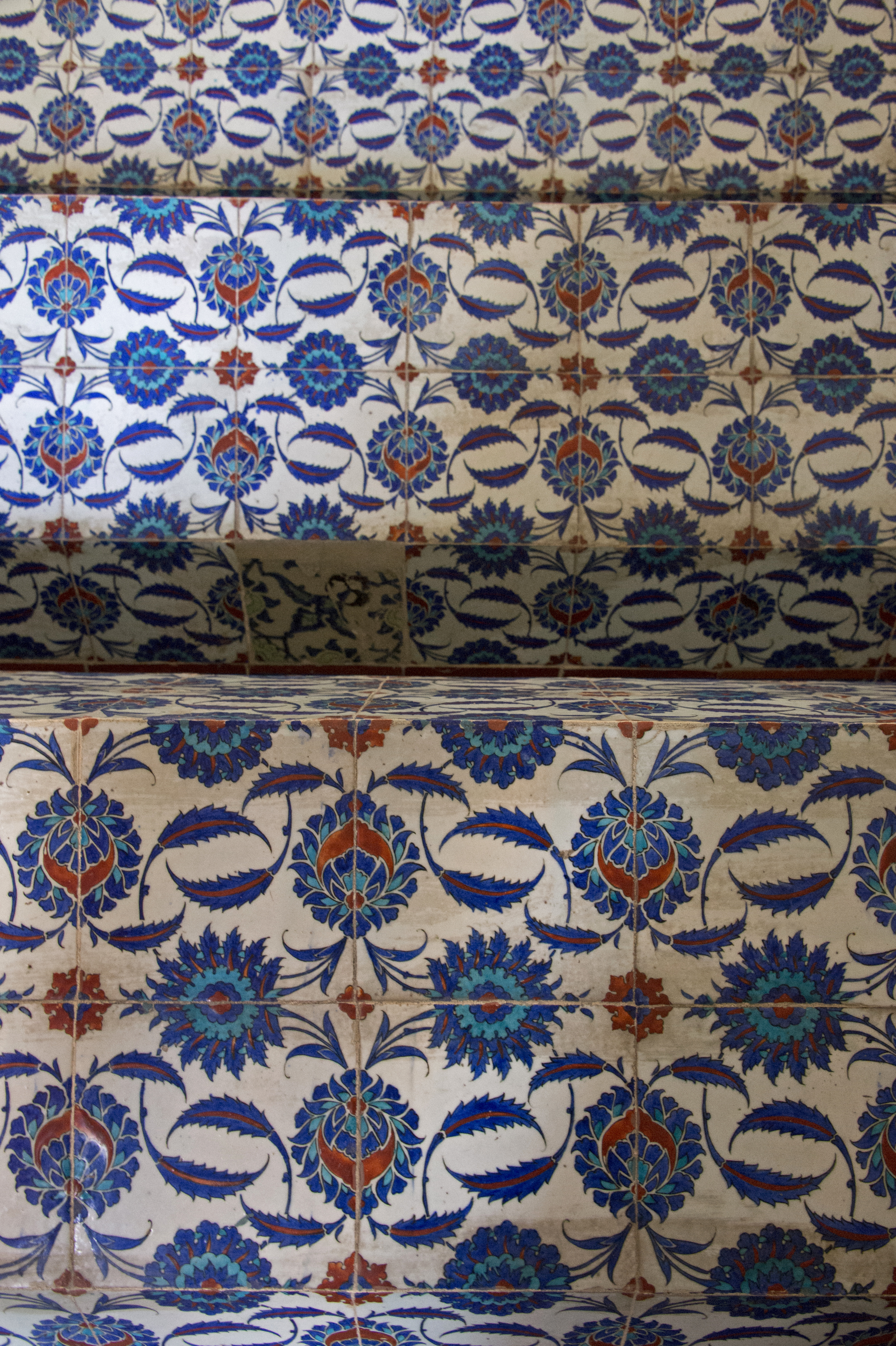
Sarcophagi

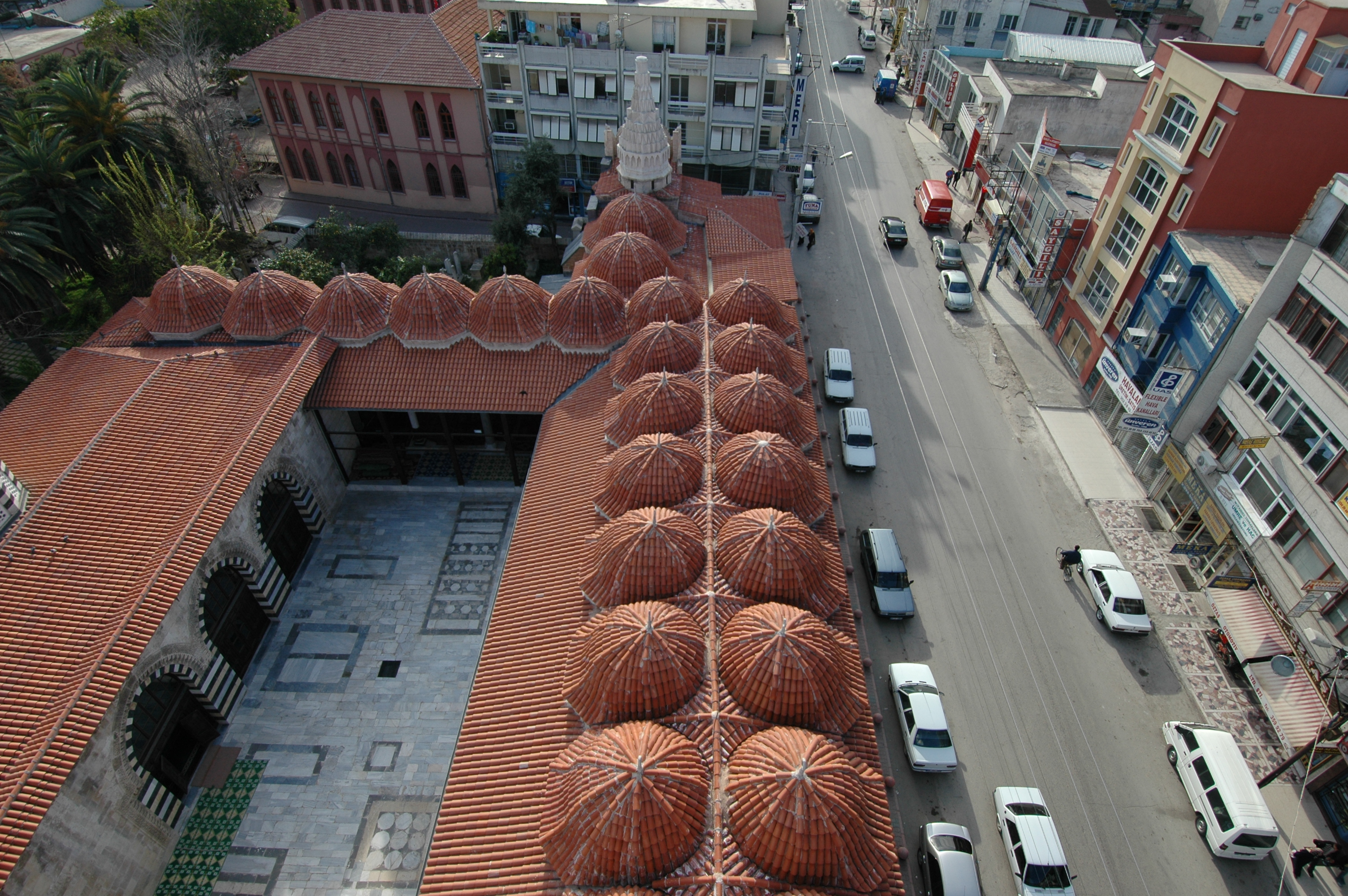
View from minaret

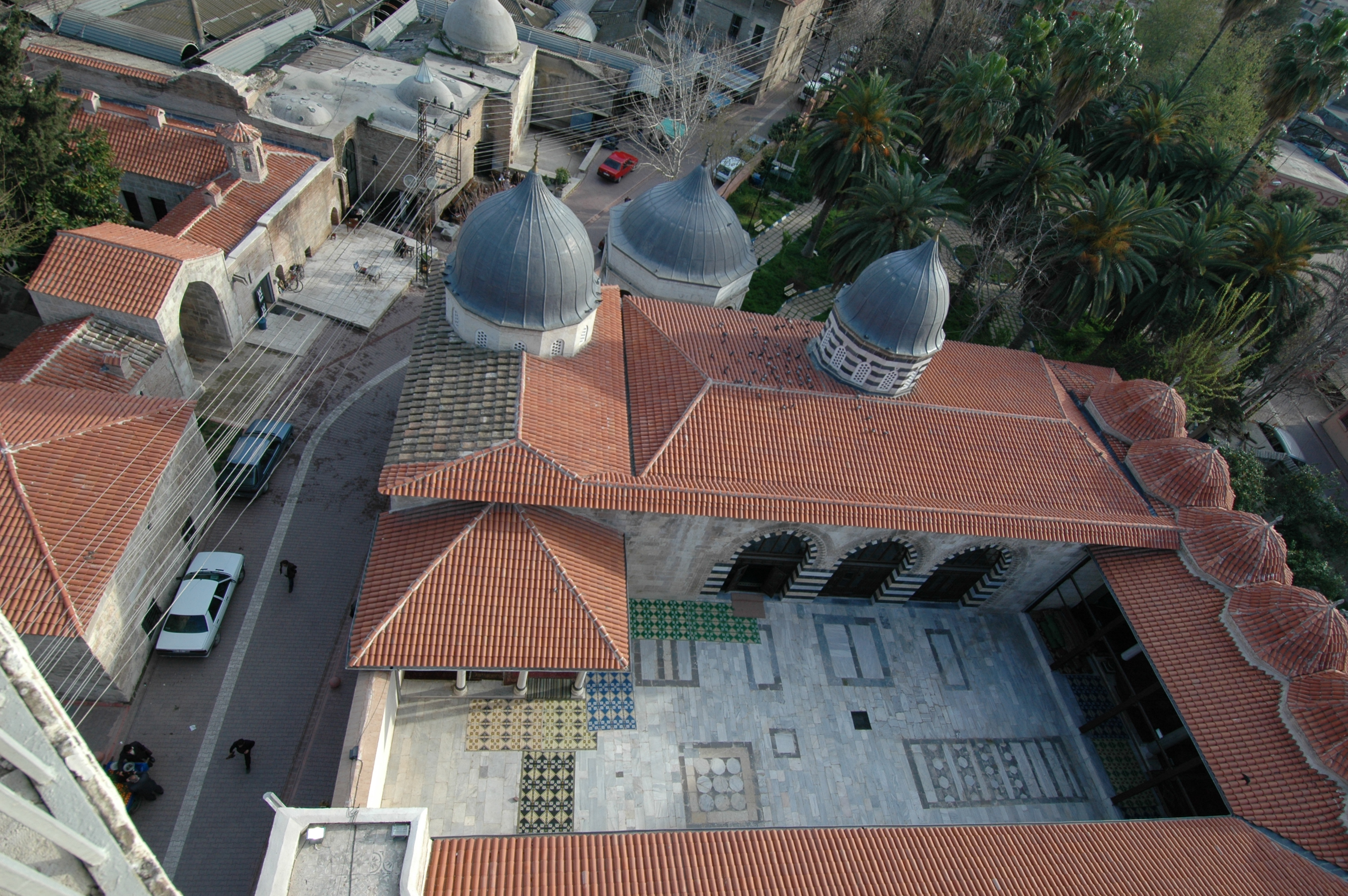
View from minaret

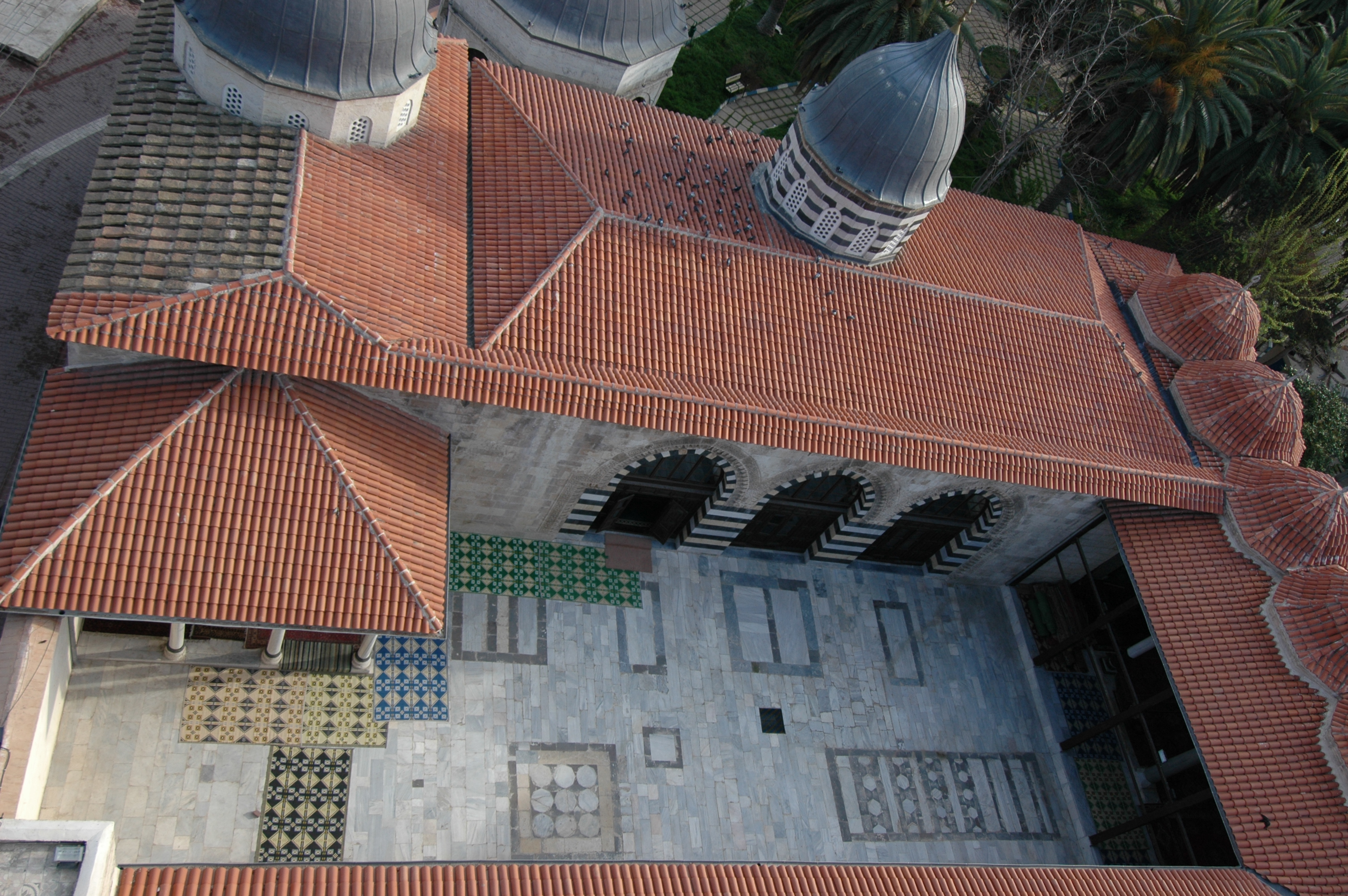
View from minaret

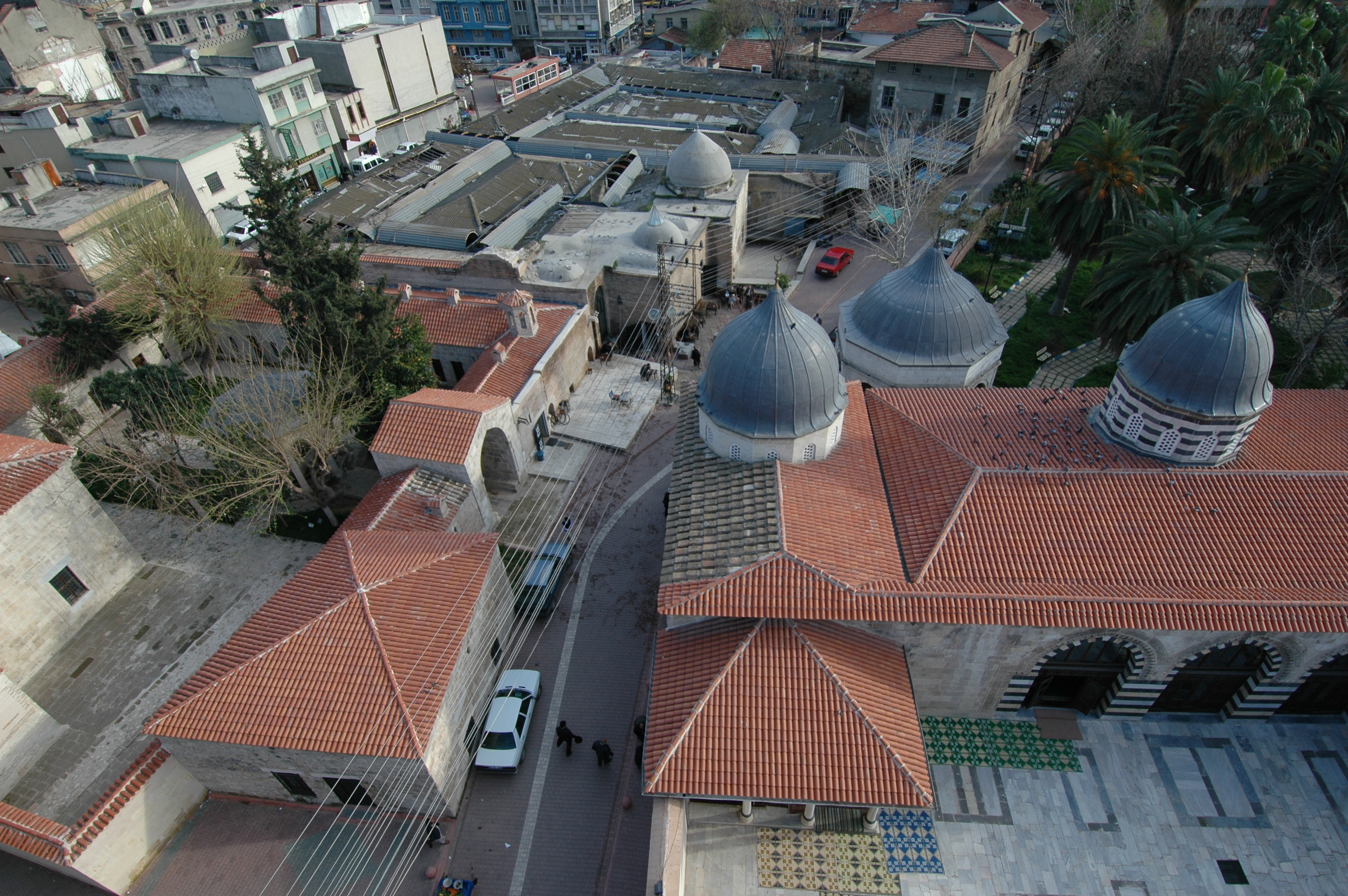
View from minaret

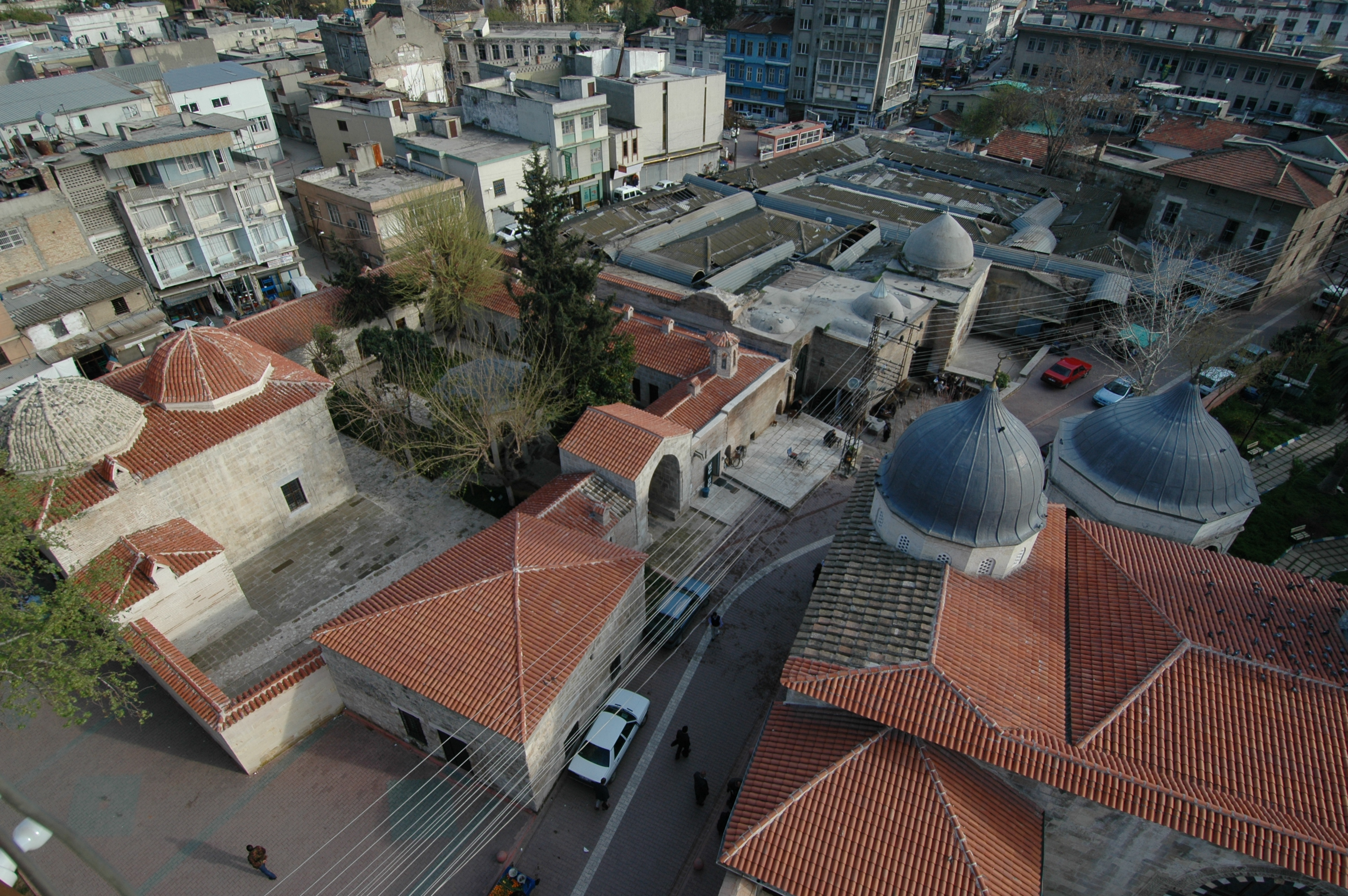
View from minaret

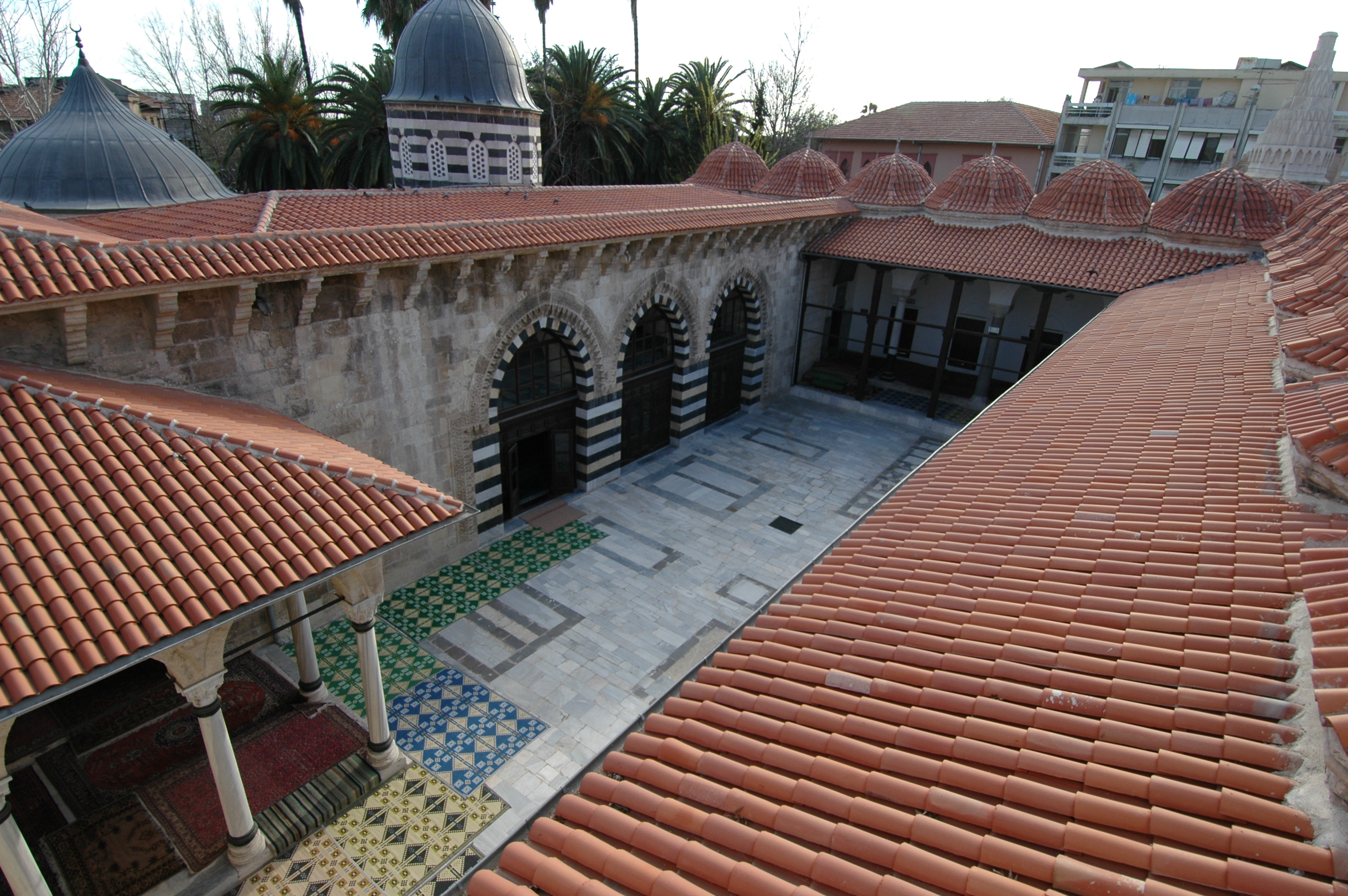
View from minaret halfway up

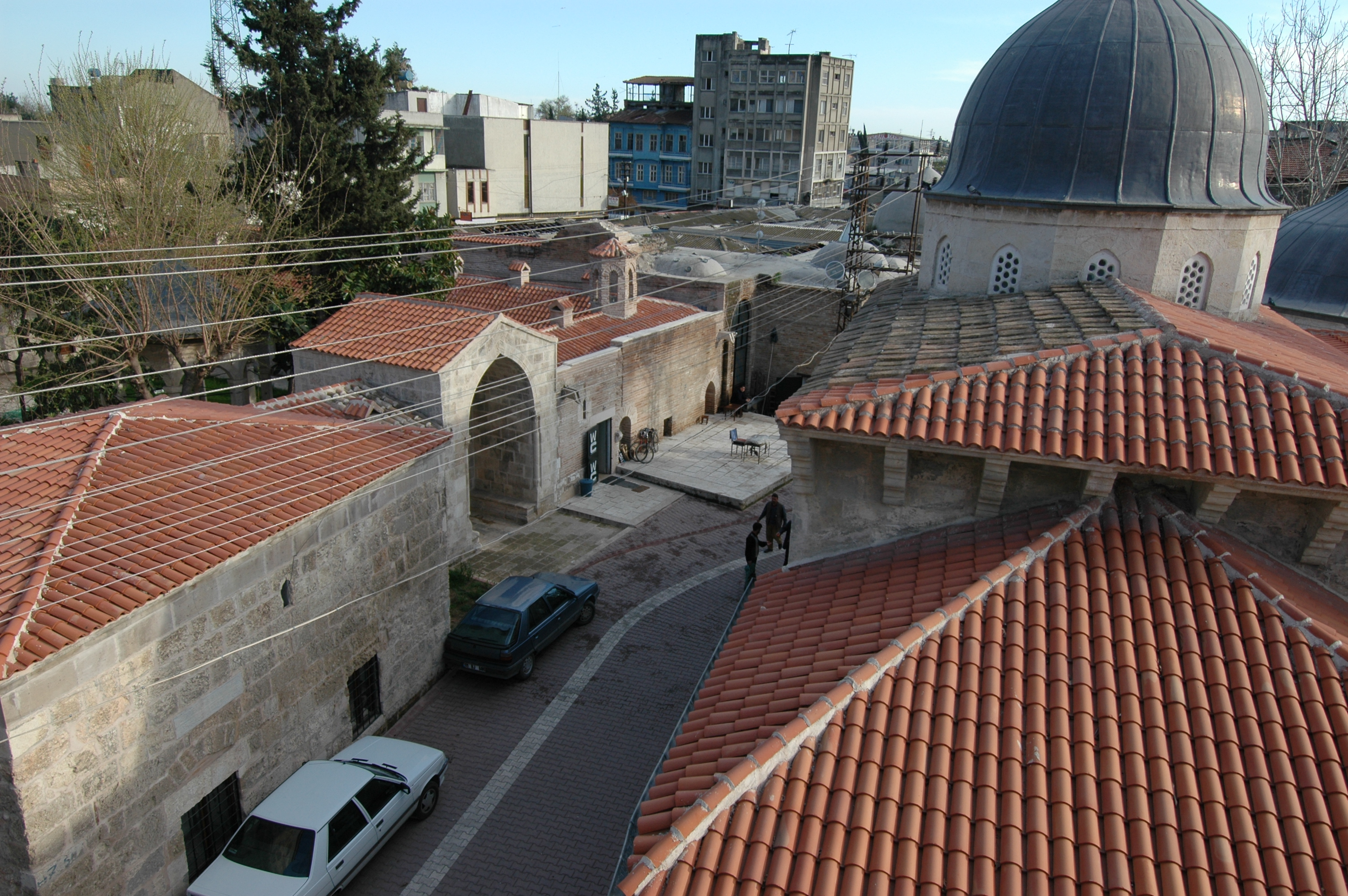
View from minaret halfway up

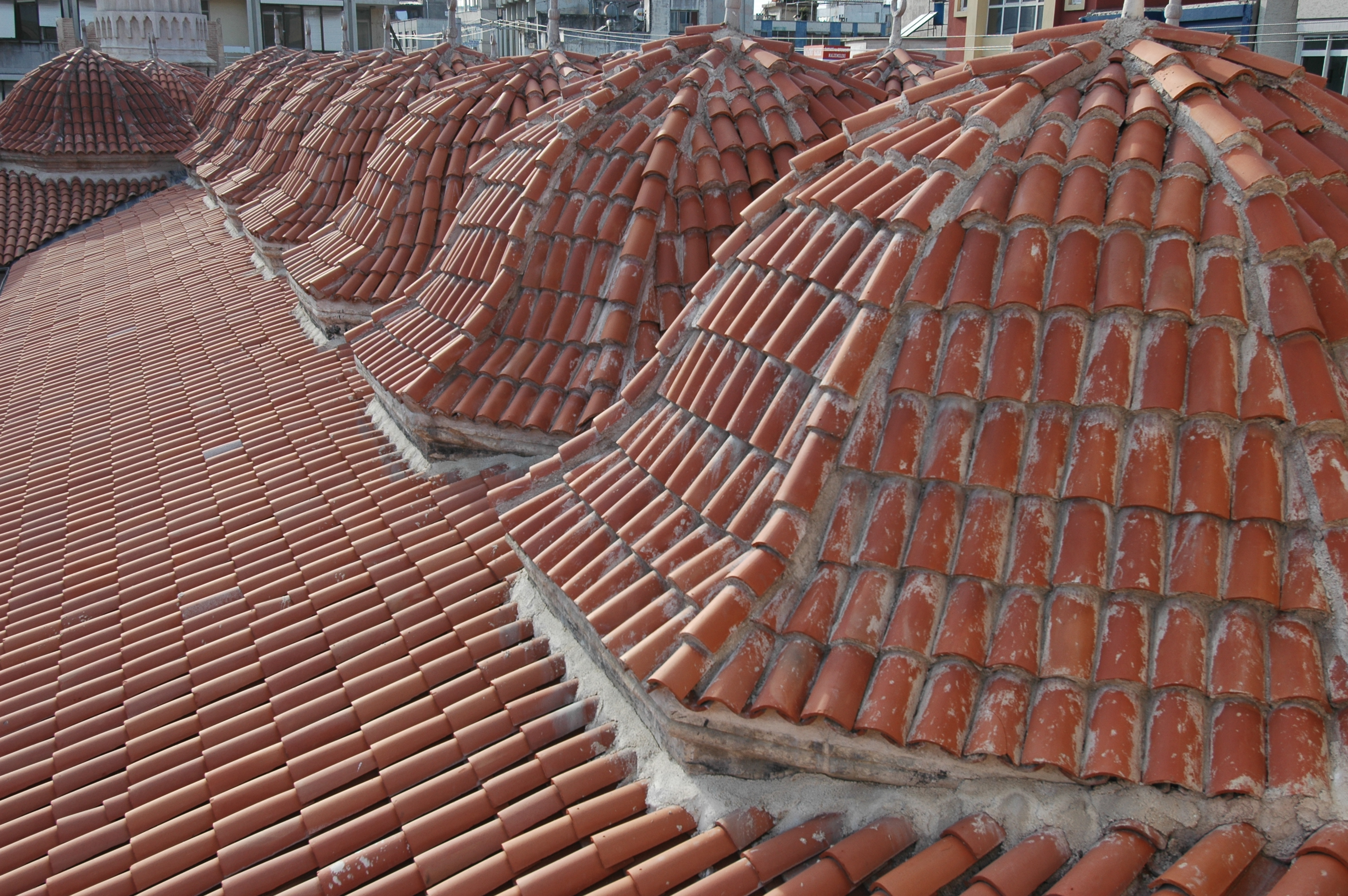
View from minaret halfway up

== See also ==
- Islamic architecture
- List of mosques
- Ottoman architecture
- List of Turkish Grand Mosques

== Sources ==
- Goodwin, Godfrey (1971). A History of Ottoman Architecture. London: Thames and Hudson. ISBN 978-0-500-27429-3.
