= Ramazanoğlu Hall =

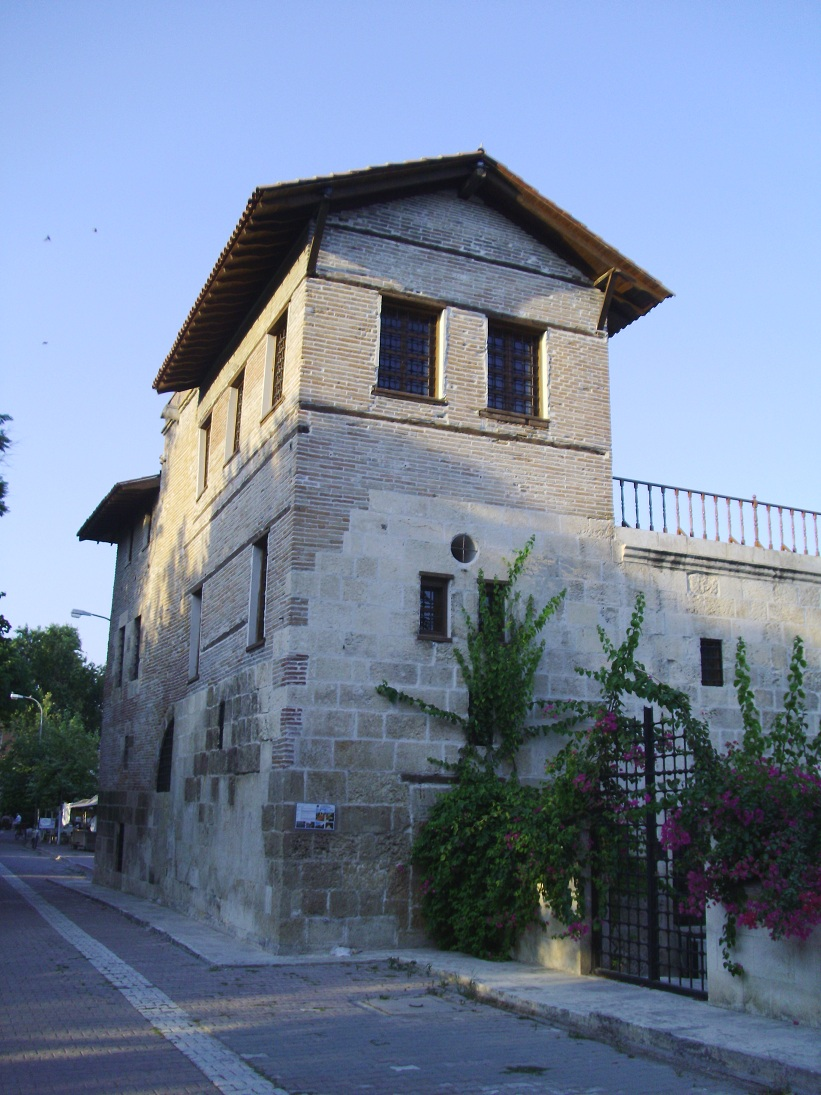
- Alternative names: ÇÜ Cultural Center

General information
- Type: State Residence
- Architectural style: Mamluk
- Location: Adana, Turkey, Kızılay Street
- Coordinates: 36°59′05″N 35°19′54″E
- Current tenants: Çukurova University
- Completed: 1495
- Renovated: 1983

Technical details
- Floor count: 3
- Floor area: 168 m^{2} (1,810 ft^{2})

Ramazanoğlu Hall is the old government residence of the Ramadanids located in Adana. Currently used as a cultural center, it is one of the oldest examples of a mansion in Turkey. Located southeast of the Ulu Camii, it was the Harem of the Ramadanid family and besides being a fine expression of modesty of the emirate, it is also an important work resembling the Mamluk mansions of Egypt.

== History ==
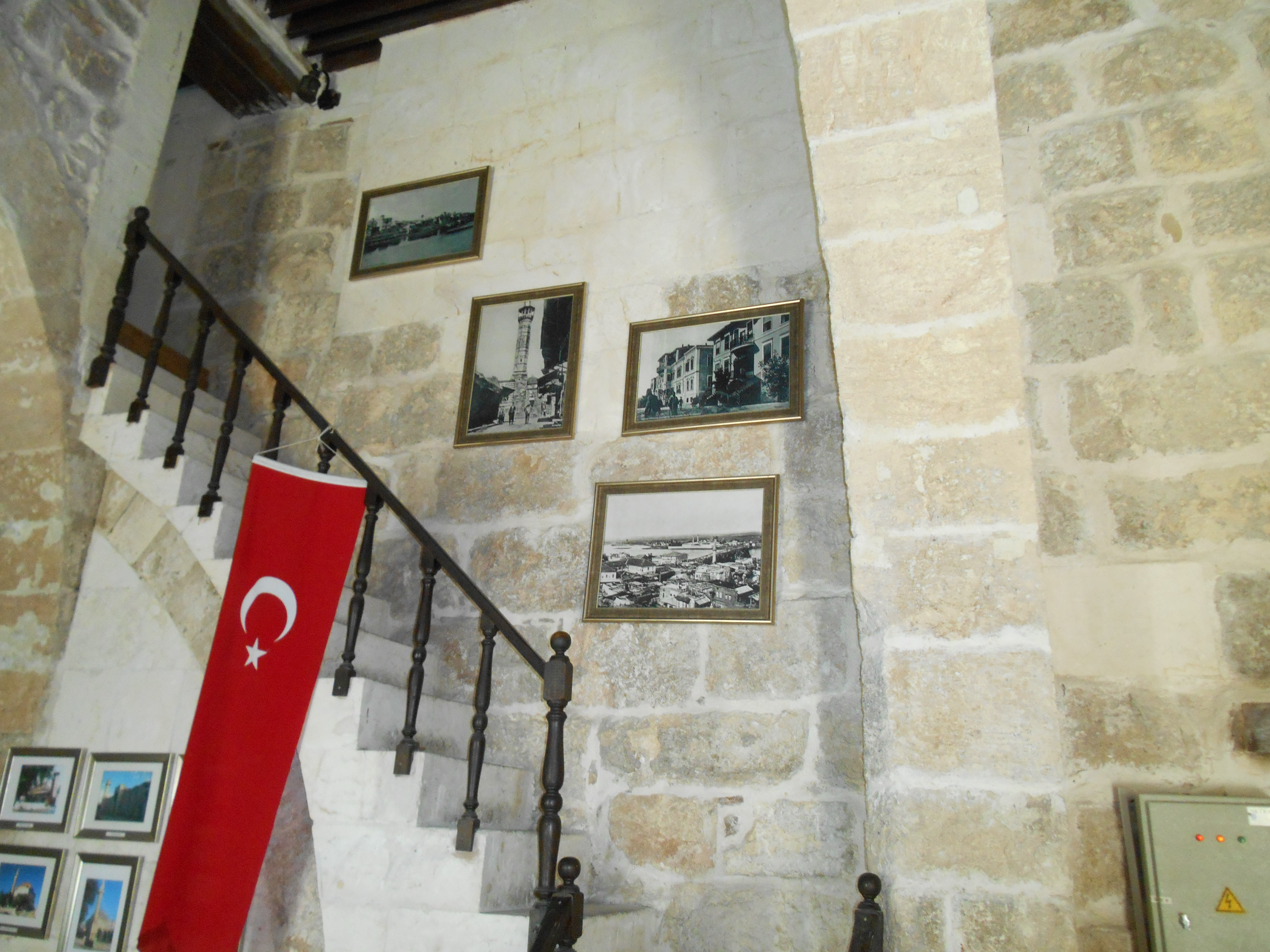
Interior of the Ramazanoğlu Hall

According to the inscription on the south gate, Haremlik was completed by Halil Bey in the month of Sha'aban year 900 (April, 1495). Nevertheless, this date does not represent the completion date of the entire building. The section completed in 1495 was an attachment to another structure on the north side which was built earlier. Next to the Harem, there used to stand the Selamlık, where the government offices were located. The Selamlık was suffered from dilapidation and the only remains today are the section with the dome and the section thought to be the hamam.

During the Ottoman Era, the hall served as a residence for number of sultans visiting Adana, including Suleiman the Magnificent and Selim I.

The hall had an extensive renovation in 1983. During the 1998 Adana–Ceyhan earthquake, the building was damaged and was restored by the General Directorate of the Foundations thereafter. The operation of the hall was then given to Çukurova University to be converted into a cultural center and on June 3, 2009, the hall opened to the public; it currently hosts conferences, meetings and concerts.

== Architecture ==
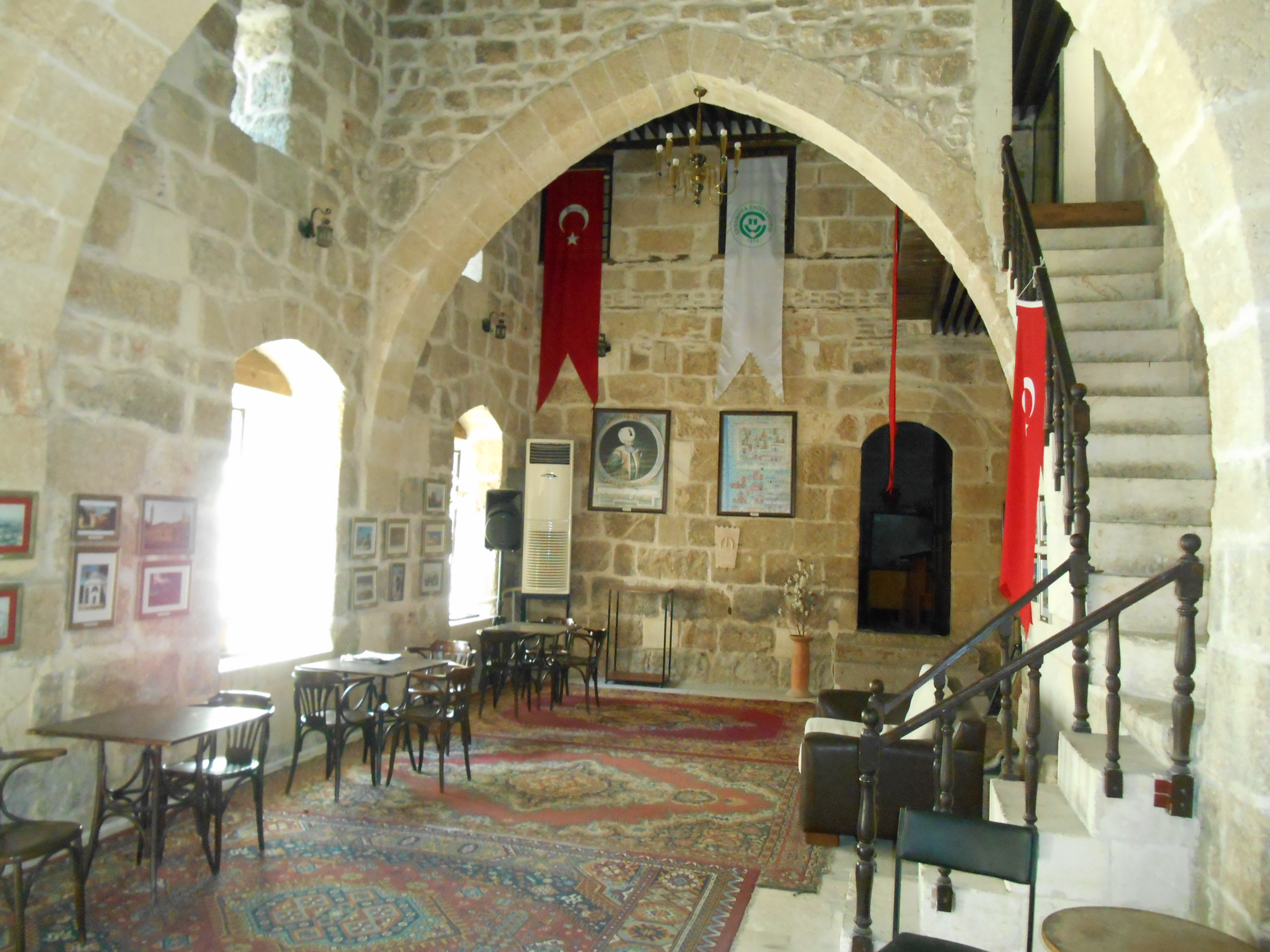
Interior of the Ramazanoğlu Hall

Ramazanoğlu Hall has a modest appearance with its architecture built of hewn stone on the lower level and brick on the upper. It is a three-story building in a rectangular shape (16x10.5m), made up of ground floor, mezzanine and an upper floor. The building also includes a courtyard placed to the east end of the L-shaped ground floor plan. On the south section of the ground floor, there is the stony place which leads to the stairs to the upper floors and two rooms on both sides of the stony place. The hallway is in the middle and on the north section, there is the groin vault room and a door opening to a cradle vault corridor. This north section was most likely the Selamlık of the mansion with spiral stairs going up.

The mezzanine floor is made up of a kitchen, two rooms and hallway in between. On the upper floor, there is the bathing cubicle west of the landing and a large bedroom at the south end. There are no ornaments in the mansion except a verse of the Koran on the west wall of the west large room, "Küllema dahele aleyha Zekerriyya'l-mihrabe", which is often seen on the mihrabs. The calligraphy, which was removed in the last restoration, indicates that this room was used as the masjid of the hall.
