= Gıyâseddîn Halil Bey =

Beg of Ramadan from 1485 to 1511

Halil Bey

Beylik of Ramadan
- Reign: 1485–1511
- Predecessor: Ömer Bey
- Successor: Mahmûd Bey
- Died: 1511
- Dynasty: Ramazanids
- Father: Dâvûd Bey
- Religion: Sunni Islam

Gıyâseddîn Halil Bey (reigned 1485–1511) was the tenth bey of the Ramadanids (Turkish: Ramazanoğulları, Ramazan, Ramazanoğulları Beyliği) who ruled the beylik of Adana. The son of Dâvûd Bey, who was killed in Aleppo in 1480, Halil Bey focused his reign on maintaining peace between the Mamluk Sultanate and the Ottoman Empire and creating an environment where Islamic scholarship and architecture flourished. He was noted for his generosity and was named Gıyâseddîn on honour of his love for his subjects. Halil Bey died in 1511 and was succeeded by his brother Mahmûd Bey.

Gıyâseddîn Halil Bey Ramazanids
Preceded by Ömer Bey	Bey of Ramadan; 1485–1511	Succeeded by Mahmûd Bey
