= Ramadanid Emirate =

Turkish autonomous administration, 1352–1608

Ramadanid Emirate Ramazanoğulları Beyliği
- 1352–1608
- Tamga of Yüreğir
- Status: Protectorate of the Mamluk Sultanate (1352-c.1397); De facto independent (c. 1397–1517); Protectorate of the Ottoman Empire (1517-1608)
- Capital: Adana
- Common languages: Turkish, Armenian, Arabic, Syriac
- Religion: Bektashi, Christianity (Armenian Apostolic Church, Syriac Christianity), Islam
- Demonym: Ramazanian
- Government: Emirate
- Bey
  - 1352: Ramazan Bey
  - 1608: Pir Mansur Bey
- Historical era: Early Modern
  - Established: 1352
  - Disestablished: 1608

Area
  - Total: 15.000 km^{2} (5.792 sq mi) (156th)
Preceded by	Succeeded by
Armenian Kingdom of Cilicia	Ottoman Empire
- Today part of: Turkey

The Ramadanid Emirate (Modern Turkish: Ramazanoğulları Beyliği) was a Turkish autonomous administration and a de facto independent emirate that existed from 1352 to 1608 in Cilicia, taking over the rule of the region from the Armenian Kingdom of Cilicia. The emirate was a protectorate of the Mamluk Sultanate until the end of the 14th century, then it was de facto independent for more than a century, and then, from 1517, a protectorate of the Ottoman Empire. The capital was Adana.

The Ramadanid Emirate was the only emirate in Anatolia that was not a successor of the Anatolian Seljuk Sultanate. It is often misclassified as an Anatolian beylik, though it was an entity under the Mamluks. Cilicia was part of the Seljuks for a short time around the turn of the 11th century and thus was not affected by the Sunni tariqa expansionism of the 13th century. In the late 14th century, the Yüreğir Turks moved to Cilicia and had a distinct culture with influence from Bektashi traditions of shamanic rituals along with Islam.

== History ==
The Mongol invasion of Asia forced Oghuz Turks to migrate into Anatolia and Levant in great numbers. A Turkish tribe from Yüreğir in Transoxiana settled in the northern regions of Mamluk Sultanate, from Antioch to Gaza with the approval of the Sultan. They were known in the Middle East as Türkmens or more specifically Yüreğirli (meaning from Yüreğir)

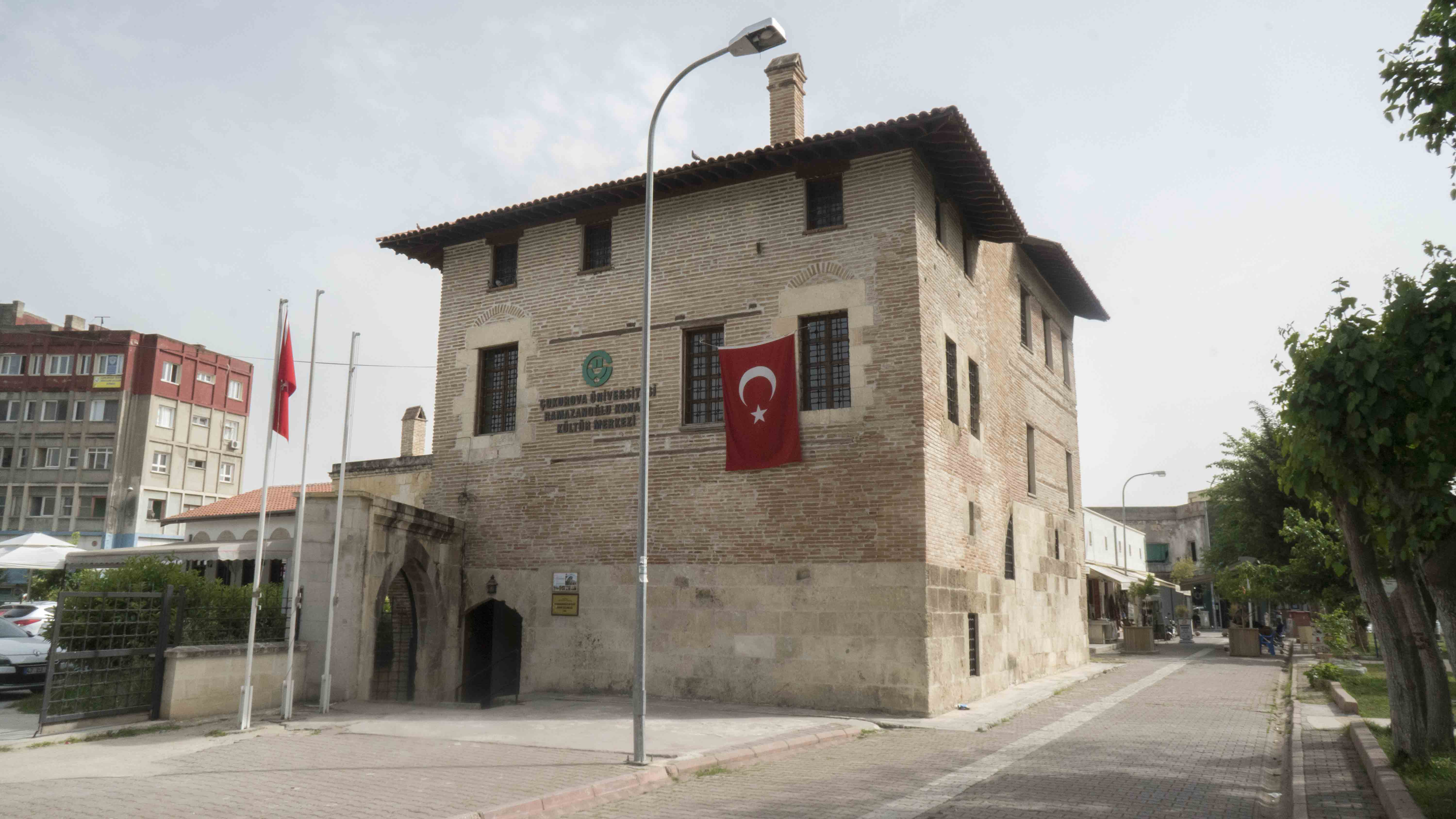
Ramazanoğlu Hall

The Ilkhanate fell into disarray after the death of Abu Sa'id, thus could not support Armenian Kingdom in guarding Cilicia. In addition, internal conflicts within the Armenian Kingdom made Türkmens turn their eyes to unstable Cilicia, and in 1352, Ramazan Beg led Turkmens to settle south of Çaldağı and founded their first settlement, Camili. Later that year, Ramazan Beg visited Cairo and was assented by the Sultan to establish the new frontier Turkmen Emirate in Cilicia. Yüreğir Türkmens lived as a small community for 7 years in southeast of Adana, and named their new land, Yüreğir. In 1359, Mamluk Sultanate Army marched into Cilicia and took over Adana and Tarsus, two major cities of the plain, leaving few castles to the Armenians. In 1375, the Mamluks gained control of the remaining areas of Cilicia, thus ending three centuries of Armenian rule. The Mamluk Sultanate authorized Ramazan Beg's Türkmen Emirate to administer Cilicia, but took direct control of the towns of: Tarsus, Ayas, Sarvandikar, Sis at the four corners of Cilicia plain and appointed an Amir and a Garrison for each. Tarsus, the former capital of Cilicia, were settled by the moors that arrived from Egypt. The Türkmen Emirate which began to be known as the Ramadanids set the city of Adana as their center of power, and many Türkmen families of Yüreğir origin moved to the city.

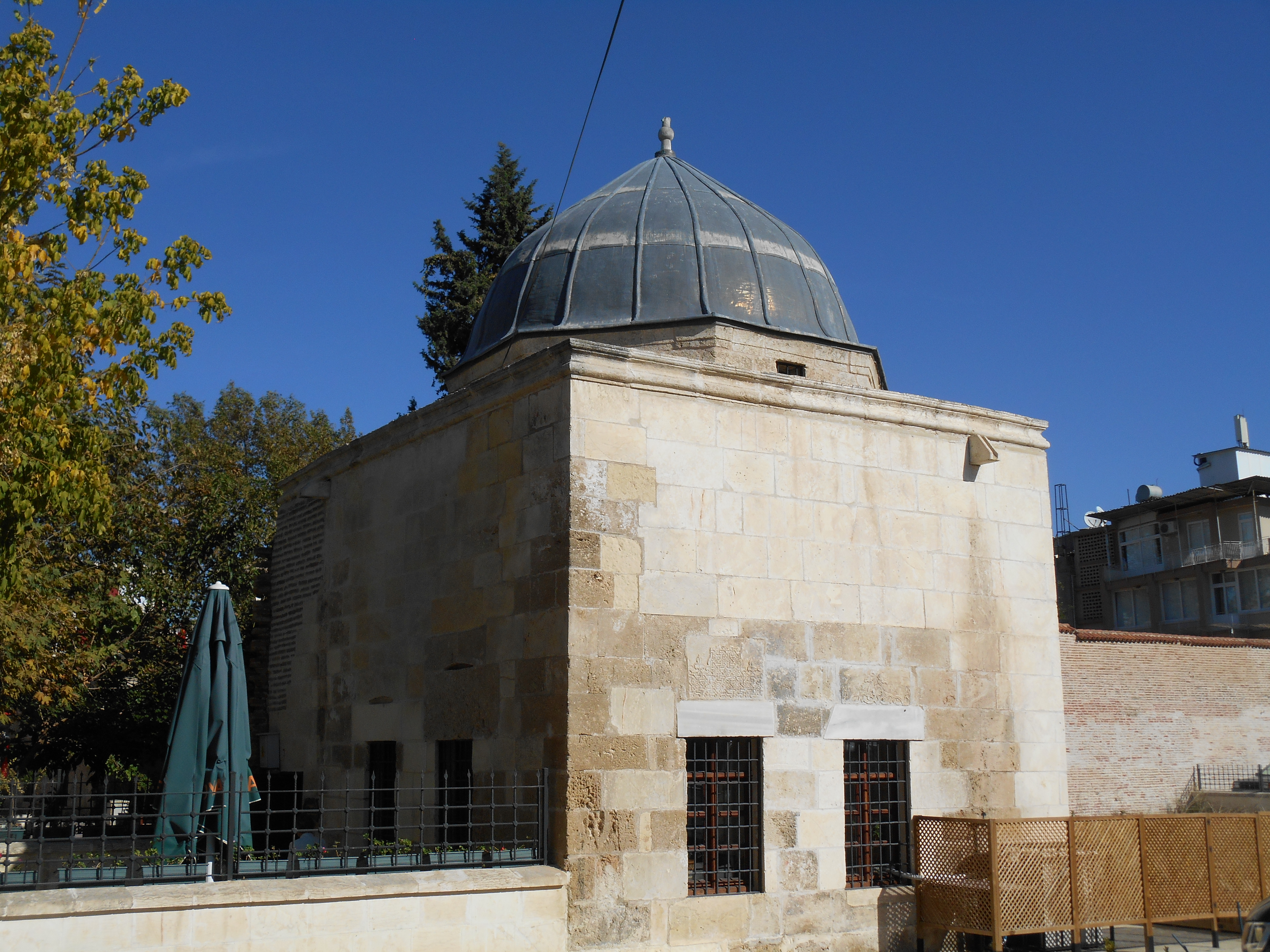
Ramazanoğlu Madrasah

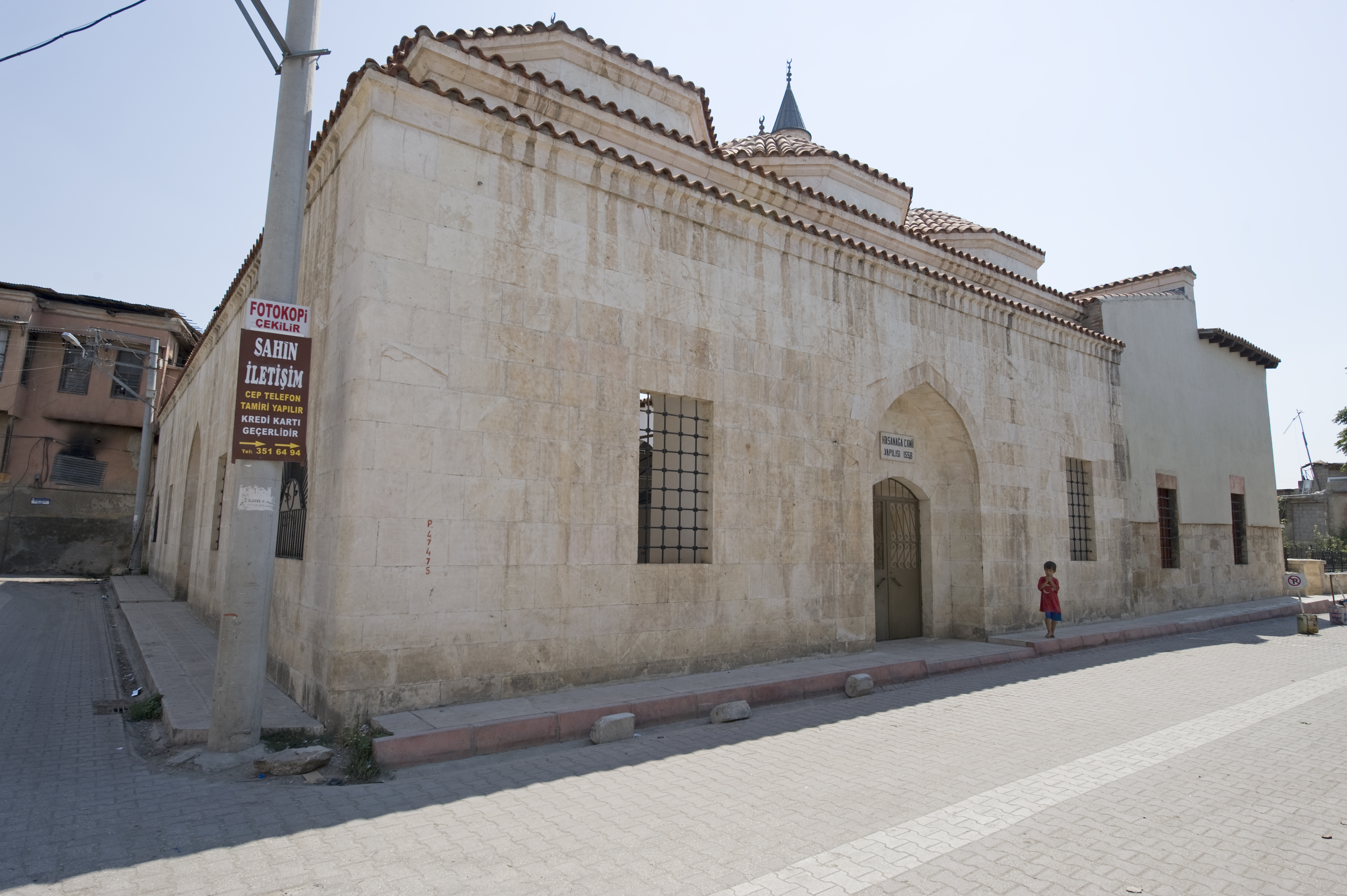
Hasan Ağa mosque

After the death of Ramazan Bey, his son Ibrahim Bey made an alliance with the Karaman Emirate. Alaeddin Bey and Ibrahim Bey together tried to remove the Mameluks' control in the province. After this alliance a great Mameluk army moved in and began to plunder but Ibrahim Bey's army achieved a great victory against the Mameluks in Belen. Also in this battle Temur Bey, the general of the Mameluks, had been captured. Yilboga, the amir of Aleppo moved on to the Turkmens after this defeat and he conquered Misis Castle.

The Ramadanids played an important role in 15th century Ottoman-Mamluk relations, being a buffer state located in the Mamluk al-'Awasim frontier zone.

In 1516, Selim I incorporated the beylik into the Ottoman Empire after his conquest of the Mamluk state. The beys of Ramadanids held the administration of the Ottoman sanjak of Adana in a hereditary manner until 1608, with the last 92 years as a vassal of the Ottomans.

The boundaries of the Ottoman Empire.

== Architecture ==
Ramazanoğlu Hall, which is used currently as a cultural center, was the state residence of the Principality. The administration hall of the Principality does not exist today.

== Culture ==
Fifteenth-century Burgundian traveler Bertrandon de la Broquière stated that the Ramadanid prince was baptized in order to "remove the bad odor" at the behest of his Christian mother.

== Ramadanid rulers ==
1. Ramazan Bey (1353)
2. Ibrāhīm I (1378–1383)
3. Shihāb al-Dīn Ahmad (1383–1416)
4. Ibrāhīm II (1416–1418)
5. ʿIzz al-Dīn Hamza (1418–1426)
6. Meḥmed I (1426–1435)
7. Eylük (1435–1439)
8. Dündār (1439–1470)
9. ʿUmar (1470–1485)
10. Gıyâseddîn Halil (1485–1510)
11. Maḥmūd (I. 1510-1514- II. 1516–1517)
12. Selīm (1514–1516)
13. Qubādh (1517–1520)
14. Pīrī Mehmed (1520–1568)
15. Darwīsh (1568–1569)
16. Ibrāhīm III (1569–1589)
17. Meḥmed II (1589–1594)
18. Pīr Mansūr (1594–1608)

== Bibliography ==
- Bosworth, Clifford Edmund (1996). New Islamic Dynasties: A Chronological and Genealogical Manual. Edinburgh University Press.
- Vryonis, Speros Jr. (1969–70). "The Byzantine Legacy and Ottoman Forms". Dumbarton Oaks Papers. 23/24: 251–308. JSTOR 1291294.
